= List of acquisitions by Oracle =

This is a listing of Oracle Corporation's corporate acquisitions, including acquisitions of both companies and individual products.

Oracle's version does not include value of the acquisition.

See also Category:Sun Microsystems acquisitions (Sun was acquired by Oracle).

Acquisition date	Company	Business	Valuation millions USD	References
2022
May 6, 2022	AdiInsights	Workforce Management (overtime management, time capture, demand forecasting and shift scheduling)		
January 4, 2022	Verenia	Verenia NetSuite CPQ founded by Victorio Pellicano		
2021
December 20, 2021	Cerner	Health information technology	$28,300	
June 25, 2021	GloriaFood	Online food ordering systems founded by Oliver Auerbach		
2019
October 2, 2019	CrowdTwist	Customer loyalty systems		
June 26, 2019	Oxygen Systems	Professional Services managed by Gerard De Van		
2018
November 15, 2018	Talari Networks	Software-Defined Wide Area Network technology		
October 22, 2018	DataFox	Artificial intelligence solutions provider		
October 17, 2018	goBalto	Health Services Automation		
September 20, 2018	Iridize	Enterprise cloud platform for employee training and onboarding		
May 16, 2018	DataScience	Data science platform		
April 30, 2018	Vocado	Student Information Systems (SIS)		
April 25, 2018	Grapeshot	Contextual Intelligence, controlling brand	$400	
April 10, 2018	SparklineData	Platform analytics services		
Feb 15, 2018	Zenedge	Intelligent Web Application Security		
2017
December 17, 2017	Aconex	SaaS-based construction project management	$1,190	
April 18, 2017	Moat	Digital advertising measurement	$850	
April 17, 2017	Wercker	Continuous integration platform		
January 19, 2017	Apiary	Hosted toolset for REST API development, test, and management		
2016
November 21, 2016	Dyn	Network management, DNS	$600	
September 18, 2016	Palerra	Cloud computing security, Cloud access security broker		
September 6, 2016	LogFire	Cloud based warehouse management applications		
July 28, 2016	NetSuite	Cloud/SaaS-based Enterprise resource planning (ERP) software	$9,300	
May 2, 2016	Opower	Cloud-based customer engagement software for the utility industry	$532	
April 28, 2016	Textura	Construction management and engineering SaaS software	$663	
April 14, 2016	Crosswise	Cross-Device Identification Mapping	$50	
February 22, 2016	Ravello Systems	Virtualization technology, enables to run applications on different hypervisors without transformations	$500	
January 5, 2016	AddThis	A media web-tracking technology company based in Vienna, Virginia, United States.	$100 - $200	
2015
December 18, 2015	StackEngine	Software for managing applications built on the open source Docker platform.		
August 20, 2015	Maxymiser	Leading provider of cloud-based software that enables marketers to test, target and personalize what a customer sees on a Web page or app		
August 6, 2015	CloudMonkey	Mobile application testing tools.		
2014
December 22, 2014	Datalogix	Data Broker & Digital Marketing	$1,200+	
September 14, 2014	Front Porch Digital	Content storage management solutions for media companies		
July 31, 2014	TOA Technologies	Provider of cloud-based field service software solutions		
June 23, 2014	MICROS Systems	Integrated software and hardware solutions to the hospitality and retail industries	$5,300	
June 20, 2014	LiveLOOK	Visual collaboration technology for co-browsing and screen sharing		
May 15, 2014	GreenBytes	Technology for data deduplication on ZFS file system, primarily targeted to optimize virtual desktop infrastructures		
Feb 24, 2014	BlueKai	Cloud-based big data platform that enables companies to personalize online, offline and mobile marketing campaigns	$400	
Jan 8, 2014	Corente	Software for a cloud service delivery in heterogeneous network environments with software-defined networking technologies		
2013
Dec 20, 2013	Responsys	Leading provider of cloud based enterprise level email marketing software		
December 4, 2013	Nirvanix	Provider of cloud based storage solutions; assets acquired after Nirvanix bankruptcy		
November 15, 2013	Bitzer Mobile	Provider of mobile applications management solutions that allow organizations to provide employees access to corporate data and applications from their mobile devices		
October 23, 2013	BigMachines	Leading provider of cloud based CPQ software	$400	
October 17, 2013	Compendium	Cloud-based content marketing provider		
March 25, 2013	Tekelec	Leading provider of network signaling, policy control, and subscriber data management solutions		
March 13, 2013	Nimbula	Developed software for the implementation of public and private cloud computing environments		
February 4, 2013	Acme Packet	Networking hardware for telecommunications service providers	$2,100	
2012
December 20, 2012	Eloqua	Marketing Automation platform for managing sales and marketing leads across an enterprise.	$810	
December 13, 2012	DataRaker	Cloud based Analytic platform to transform meter, customer, network and asset Big Data into actionable business intelligence.		
November 8, 2012	Instantis	Cloud and premises-based Project Portfolio Management (PPM) applications and services.		
September 17, 2012	SelectMinds	Cloud-based social talent sourcing and corporate alumni management application		
July 30, 2012	Xsigo Systems	Provider of network virtualization technology that simplifies cloud infrastructure and operations		
July 19, 2012	Skire	Solutions provider for managing capital projects, facilities and real estate		
July 10, 2012	Involver	Social media development platform		
June 5, 2012	Collective Intellect	Cloud-based social intelligence solutions		
May 23, 2012	Vitrue	Social Marketing Platform provider	$300 (estimated)	
March 29, 2012	ClearTrial	Cloud-based Clinical Trial Operations and Analytics products		
February 9, 2012	Taleo	Talent Management Software	$1,900	
2011
October 24, 2011	RightNow Technologies	Cloud-based CRM	$1,500	
October 18, 2011	Endeca	E-commerce & Business Intelligence	$1,075	
September 22, 2011	GoAhead Software	Service Availability and Management Software		
July 28, 2011	InQuira	Service Knowledge Management Software		
July 21, 2011	Ksplice	Rebootless Linux kernel updates		
June 2011	FatWire Software	Web Content and Web Experience Management (WCM and WEM) Software		
June 2011	Pillar Data Systems	Storage systems		
April 2011	Datanomic	Data Quality Software		
February 2011	Ndevr - Select IP only	Environmental Reporting and Business Intelligence		
2010
November 2010	Art Technology Group	Ecommerce software vendor	$1,000	
May 2010	Pre-Paid Software	Payment Solutions	$73	
May 2010	Market2Lead	Applications		
May 20, 2010	Secerno	Data protection hardware and software		
April 16, 2010	Phase Forward	Applications for life sciences companies and healthcare providers	$685	
February 10, 2010	AmberPoint	Service-Oriented Architecture (SOA) management		
February 10, 2010	Convergin	Telecom Service Broker	$85	
January 27, 2010	Sun Microsystems	Computer servers, storage, networks, Java, MySQL database, software, and services	$7,400	
January 4, 2010	Silver Creek Systems	Product Data Quality Solutions for connecting Enterprise systems, Customers, Suppliers and Partners.		
2009
October 12, 2009	SOPHOI	Intellectual property management for Media & Entertainment Industry		
September 29, 2009	HyperRoll	Financials, software and IT services		
July 23, 2009	GoldenGate Software	Heterogeneous Replications, software and IT		
Jun 17, 2009	Conformia	Product Lifecycle Management		
May 13, 2009	Virtual Iron Software	Server Virtualization Management Software		
March 23, 2009	Relsys International	Drug Safety and Risk Management		
2008
October 29, 2008	Haley (RuleBurst Holdings)	Natural Language Business Rules / Policy Automation		
October 9, 2008	Advanced Visual Technology	Retail Space Planning		
October 9, 2008	Primavera	Project Portfolio Management		
June 23, 2008	Skywire Software	Document Management		
May 13, 2008	AdminServer	Insurance policy administration		
April 29, 2008	BEA Systems	Enterprise Application and Middleware Software (WebLogic)	$8,500	
January 16, 2008	Captovation	Enterprise Content Management		
2007
December 6, 2007	Moniforce	Real User Experience Monitoring	$50	
September 5, 2007	Bridgestream	Enterprise Role Management software		
July 18, 2007	Bharosa, Inc	Online Identity Theft and Fraud Detection		
May 15, 2007	Agile Software Corporation	Product Lifecycle Management	$495	
April 24, 2007	Lodestar Corporation	Utilities Application Software		
March 1, 2007	Hyperion Corporation	Enterprise Performance Management	$3,300	
March 2007	Tangosol Inc	Datagrid Software		
2006
November, 2006	Stellent Inc	Enterprise content management, Digital rights management. Stellent was previously named Intranet Solutions, and its product was initially IntraDoc!. The product was then briefly renamed Xpedio! before both the company and the product were renamed Stellent in 2001. At the time of the acquisition, Stellent had 575 employees. Stellent was a publicly traded company (NASDAQ: STEL) with trailing twelve month revenues in excess of $130 million. Stellent's primary product was known as Universal Content Management (UCM), which formed the foundation of most of its other content management products. This product and its related products were rolled into Oracle Fusion Middleware as part of the Oracle WebCenter Content product line. However, the term Stellent is still commonly used for this suite of applications.	$440	
November 3, 2006	SPL WorldGroup	Utility Billing and Customer Service Systems		
October 2006	Sunopsis	ETL, Data Integration		
October 2006	MetaSolv	OSS service activation	$219	
June 2006	Demantra	Demand-Driven Planning Solution	$41	
June 2006	Telephony@Work	Leading IP-based Contact Center Solution		
April 2006	Net4Call	Communications infrastructure and solutions		
April 2006	Portal Software	Billing and Revenue Management solutions for the communications and media industry	$220	
February 2006	HotSip	Communications infrastructure solutions		
February 2006	Sleepycat Software	Open-source database software for embedded applications		
January 2006	360Commerce	Retail Industry Solutions		
January 2006	Siebel Systems	Customer relationship management	$5,850	Siebel Systems#Key dates
2005
December 2005	Temposoft	Workforce Management Applications sam organization		
November 2005	OctetString	Virtual Directory Solutions		
November 2005	Thor Technologies	Enterprise-wide User Provisioning Solutions		
October 2005	Innobase	Discrete Transactional Open Source Database Technology		
September 2005	G-Log	Transportation Management Solutions		
August 2005	i-flex Solutions	Banking Industry Solutions, Flexcube	$900	
July 2005	Context Media	Enterprise Content Integration		
July 2005	ProfitLogic	Retail Industry Solutions		
June 2005	TimesTen	Real-time Enterprise Solutions		
June 2005	TripleHop	Context-sensitive Enterprise Search		
April 2005	Retek	Retail Industry Solutions	$630	
March 2005	Oblix	Identity Management Solutions		
January 2005	PeopleSoft	Enterprise Software	$10,300	
2004
June 2004	Collaxa	Business process management		
May 2004	Phaos Corporation	Identity management		
January 22, 2004	SiteWorks Solutions	Clinical trials management		
2003
June 2003	Reliaty	Enterprise data protection		
June 2003	FileFish	Enterprise content management		
2002
June 2002	Steltor	Enterprise calendaring system		
January 16, 2002	NetForce Corporation	Adverse event reporting system		
January 15, 2002	Indicast Corporation	Voice portals		
January 2002	TopLink	Object-relation mapping technology		
2000
February 2000	Carleton Corporation	Data Warehousing and ETL Systems	$8	
1999
December 1999	Concentra Corporation	Product configuration system	$43	
June 1999	Thinking Machines Corporation	Darwin, datamining technology		
April 1999	Tinoway	Mobile Field Service		
April 1999	Geodan EDT	Field Service Scheduler and Optimization		
March 1999	E-Travel	Online Business Travel Booking and Management	$35	
1997
September 1997	Treasury Services Corporation	Banking applications, Financial planning applications		
October 1999	Clear Thinking Technology	Educational technology software	$1.5	
1995
August 1995	IRI Software	OLAP products	$100	
1994
December 2, 1994	Rdb Division of Digital Equipment Corporation	Relational database	$108	
