= Oracle CRM =

Customer relationship management system

- Developer: Oracle Corporation
- Type: CRM software
- Website: www.oracle.com/cx/what-is-crm/

Oracle CRM is a customer relationship management system created by Oracle Corporation. It includes a number of different cloud applications that can be deployed together or used individually to analyze customer data and help companies connect and manage sales, marketing, and customer support.

== History ==
Oracle hired Mark Barrenechea in 1997 to build a CRM development team. That development team evolved into the CRM division of Oracle in 1998, the first year that Oracle CRM was released. Later, Barrenechea was responsible for the CRM half of Oracle's E-Business Suite (EBS) when he helped to bridge the separation between CRM and ERP by creating a single database that covered marketing, sales, order management, and accounting. This allowed Oracle to automate the entire CRM business flow, from lead to billing.

=== Transition to Oracle Advertising and CX ===
In 2012, Oracle announced a new cloud-based focus on customer experience (CX) within its CRM business. At the time, CX was a relatively new term and referred to “the notion of providing a much more personalized approach to marketing and support." In 2021, Oracle combined its CX products with those from Oracle Data Cloud and renamed them Oracle Advertising and Customer Experience (CX). Oracle Advertising and Customer Experience (CX) is the name of Oracle's CRM system in the cloud.

== Oracle CRM and Oracle Advertising and CX functionalities ==
Oracle provides the following CRM functionalities in its products:

- Lead management through Oracle Marketing
- Contact management through Oracle Sales
- Reporting and analytics through Oracle Analytics
- Sales force automation through Oracle Sales
- Mobile CRM through Oracle Sales
- AI through Oracle Sales and Oracle Marketing
- Email marketing through Oracle Marketing
- Sales forecasting through Oracle Sales
- Marketing automation through Oracle Marketing

== Oracle's variations of CRM ==
Oracle offers different installations of the CRM system:

- On premises system
  - PeopleSoft Enterprise CRM (formerly owned by PeopleSoft, which was acquired by Oracle in 2005)
  - eBusiness Suite CRM
  - Siebel CRM
- Cloud
  - Oracle Advertising and Customer Experience (CX)
    - Advertising
    - Marketing
    - Sales
    - Service

== Oracle CRM acquisitions ==
2005

- Siebel Systems

2010

- Art Technology Group (ATG)

2011

- RightNow Technologies

2012

- Eloqua

2013

- Compendium
- Responsys
- BigMachines

2014

- TOA Technologies
- BlueKai

2015

- Maxymiser

2018

- DataFox
