= Customer value model =

Representation of the monetary worth of what a company could do for its customers

Within customer relationship management, a customer value model (CVM) is a data-driven representation of the worth, in monetary terms, of what a company is doing or could do for its customers. Customer value models are tools used primarily in B2B markets where the choice of a given product, service, or offering is based primarily upon the amount of customer value created. Customer value is defined as value = benefits minus price. Thus, customer benefits are quantified in a CVM; product features and capabilities are translated into dollars. Customer value models are different from customer lifetime value models, which seek to quantify the value of a customer to its suppliers.

== Firms using customer value models ==
Many firms have been reported to use customer value models, including General Electric, Alcoa, W.W. Grainger, Qualcomm, Sonoco, BT Industries Group, Rockwell Automation, and Akzo Nobel.

== Uses of customer value models ==
1. New product and service development and refinement: The dialog and customer immersion that is part of a CVM is used to discover and determine which potential product features and functionality would create the most value for customers. This on-site interaction can be used to frame and define those features and functionality. Often a key is to focus on product or service capabilities rather than on features. Successful CVM efforts change the basis of the customer-supplier product conversation away from features and functions and toward problems, benefits, and value.
2. Sales tools: CVMs can serve as a quantified statement of value and benefits for a customer that is used by the vendor sales staff to both sell into a new account, as well as to reaffirm and validate value created for current customers as a means to retain and grow current customer. CVMs also can help firms to determine the more rational promotion cost.

== Customer value model methods ==
There are several methods and approaches used to create customer value models. All of these approaches appear to depend on substantial customer interaction and on-site interviews and observations of customers' challenges related to the product or service being valued. The CVMs are of varying complexity. One consulting firm has found it useful to reverse-engineer customer P&Ls (profit and loss statements) to establish a clear connection between the product benefits and the customer bottom-line.
