= Social selling =

Process of developing relationships as part of the sales process

Social selling is the process of developing relationships as part of the sales process. Today this often takes place via social networks such as LinkedIn, Twitter, Facebook, and Pinterest, but can take place either online or offline. Examples of social selling techniques include sharing relevant content, interacting directly with potential buyers and customers, personal branding, and social listening. Social Selling is gaining popularity in a variety of industries, though it is used primarily for B2B (business-to-business) selling or highly considered consumer purchases (e.g., financial advisory services, automotive, realty). C2C companies (often referred to as direct selling companies) have been using social selling techniques (i.e. relationship building) since far before the Internet existed. B2B and B2C companies are now adopting many of those techniques as they are translated to social media platforms.

While social selling is sometimes confused with social marketing, there are two key differences. First, social selling is focused on sales professionals, rather than marketing professionals. Second, social selling aims to cultivate one-on-one relationships, rather than broadcast one-to-many messages. social marketing is a powerhouse which can provide right info at right time, but potential consumer expects established relationship rather than just info, so a completely successful selling process requires both social selling and social marketing to act together.

== Overview ==
The University of British Columbia first established the science of social selling during research. They found that where there are incidental similarities between a buyer and seller, it is more likely a purchase would take place. For example, if two people follow the same sports team, they are more likely to feel a connection, and social technology can help sales professionals discover such incidental similarities to build a quicker bond with a potential client.

Whilst the University of British Columbia discovered the science, it was Nigel Edelshain who was first to put the science into practice, coining the term sales 2.0 after the rise of web 2.0 in 2006. Edelshain identified prospecting as the central weakness of sales techniques from the 1990s and early 2000s, which typically could only be applied once a salesperson already had contact with a prospect.

Social selling has become more popular as companies look to increase the return on investment of their social media activity. Sales teams frequently mine data from social media to help connect with customers and create more targeted sales leads.

== Arguments for and against ==
Supporters advocate for social selling as a necessary and effective response to a changing selling environment. They argue that, while sales professionals still impact the path to purchase, they are no longer able to personally manage the buying process. These advocates cite a Corporate Executive Board (CEB) study that reports almost 60% of today's buying process is complete before the buyer reaches out to sales. To show effectiveness, supporters point to an Aberdeen Group study finding that social sellers outperform other sales professionals across a range of key performance indicators (KPIs).

The most common criticism is that "social selling" is an overhyped buzzword rather than a true sales methodology. Detractors argue that in-person meetings are still more effective than social networking for cultivating relationships, and that social networking should complement, not replace, traditional sales activity.

Empirical research on the sales-performance benefits of social selling has produced mixed results. A survey of 1,699 business-to-business salespeople across more than 25 industries found a positive relationship between social media use, the sales process, and relationship-based sales performance. Other studies have found the benefit to be more conditional: a study of European B2B firms found that salesperson social media use increased customer loyalty only among high-status customers and customers with small buying centers, with no measurable benefit for other customer segments. A 2024 qualitative study interviewing 26 B2B decision-makers found that buyers frequently experienced unsolicited social media outreach as spam, remained largely passive on social platforms for work purposes, and considered private messaging channels more effective than public social networks for building trust with suppliers. Research on the adoption of sales technology, including social media tools, has also linked it to increased technostress and role stress among sales professionals, an effect moderated by the salesperson's commitment to their job.

== Components ==
Social prospecting involves monitoring and/or searching social networks for signs of customer interest, immediate buying intent, or qualified prospect status based on industry, role, geography, etc. For example, a financial advisor may monitor social media for major life events (e.g., birth of a child, change in employment status, retirement, death of a parent) that correlate to a need for investment advice. Local micro-enterprises also utilize interactive content, such as polls and topic-based community threads, to identify regional customer needs and gather real-time sales leads.

Personal branding is the use of social media to establish an individual's reputation and credibility. Typically this is done through the creation of compelling personal profiles that showcase a sales professional's expertise, credibility, and integrity.

Employee advocacy is when sales professionals or other staff leverage their own social presence to share positive news, stories, and insights about their company with their networks. This includes sharing content, responding to questions, connecting with industry leaders, and using industry- and company-related hashtags. While some companies give employees the license to create and promote their own content, many companies establish guidelines, or even supply appropriate content to employees.

Social relationship management is the use of digital networks as channels for nurturing ongoing relationships with customers. Social relationship management – sometimes referred to as social CRM - is an extension of traditional relationship management that focuses on communication and feedback with customers vis-a-vis social media. Social Relationship Management tactics include listening and responding to customer feedback online, and re-posting user-generated content regarding company. Social Relationship Management emphasizes authentic and genuine connections, and directly engaging with stakeholders in online conversations.

Finding the right people is another fundamental pillar towards applying social selling. Due to the evolution of sales and marketing, a typical B2B buying committee for a complex purchase now involves six to ten people. Therefore, it becomes crucial to get to know those people to start influencing and building sustainable and long-term relationships with them.

== Academic research ==
A 2017 literature review of social media research in industrial marketing found that most published studies treated social media primarily as a promotional tool for salespeople, and called for further research into social media as an analytical tool in business markets. A 2022 study developed activity-based measures of social selling and validated three underlying dimensions: insight generation, connecting, and engagement. Earlier research identified organizational competence and commitment to social media, alongside individual salesperson commitment, as stronger predictors of social media use in sales than customer-related factors.

Other studies have examined the mechanisms linking social media use to sales outcomes. Research has found that social media use supports competitive intelligence collection and adaptive selling, particularly when salespeople have a strong learning orientation, while a two-study examination found that formal training moderates whether social media technology use translates into improved sales performance.

Qualitative research has explored how organizations and individual salespeople adopt social selling in practice. Focus groups conducted in the United States and United Kingdom identified six recurring themes in how sales managers and salespeople used social media and related technology, including shifting generational expectations and a closer relationship between sales and marketing functions. Interview-based research involving 32 B2B sales professionals found that salespeople actively perform institutional work—including promoting, reconciling, and at times disrupting existing sales norms—to establish social selling as a legitimate practice within their organizations, rather than simply adopting it once introduced by management.

== Measurement ==
There are at least three distinct methods for measuring social selling and social selling effectiveness.

Social Selling Index (SSI) is a score created by LinkedIn to rank a members' use of LinkedIn as a social selling tool. The SSI is based on four criteria: Creating a professional brand, finding the right people, engaging with insights, and building strong relationships. Each criterion is assigned a value from 1-25, and the four numbers are totaled for an overall SSI score. Strengths of this method include its multi-dimensional methodology and relative clarity on the criteria used. The SSI is limited by its exclusive focus on LinkedIn (as opposed to other social networks), and its focus on activity (as opposed to impact or outcomes). LinkedIn asserted in 2015 that high SSI professionals generate 45% more opportunities per quarter. LinkedIn has since stated that the SSI score "no longer accurately reflects the modern sales environment" and that "a high SSI score doesn't always represent the efficacy of a sales person or correlate with measurable sales outcomes", redirecting sellers toward AI-powered tools and outcome-based metrics instead.

Klout Score quantified an individual's social influence by analyzing the social graph's response to content posted by the individual. Also based on a 1-100 ranking score, Klout differed from the Social Selling Index in two key ways. First, it looked across social networks for its measurement. Second, it looked at impact (rather than activity) by analyzing social gestures such as following, retweeting, liking, favoriting, etc. Critics of the Klout Score claimed that social gestures (following, liking, and favoriting, etc.) are superficial actions, and insufficiently meaningful to serve as accurate or reliable indicators of true influence. Also, the application of Klout score to a sales context was merely indirect, given that Klout was designed to be an influence metric rather than a sales metric per se. Klout was discontinued by its owner, Lithium Technologies, on May 25, 2018.

Revenue attribution is a technique employed by some sales organizations to measure social selling effectiveness, explicitly identifying new deals sourced or influenced by social activity and using the value of those deals to quantify success. The revenue attribution method has the benefit of linking social selling to specific deals won. However, revenue attribution tends to be more complex to track, requiring manual data capture and/or customization to Customer Relationship Management systems where sales data is captured and analyzed.

== In an enterprise ==
According to IBM, a company that integrates social media into its business model embraces and cultivates collaboration internally and externally. IBM piloted a social selling program in 2012, cited as an early example of social selling implemented at the enterprise level.

Created in 2015 by Gaurav Kakkar, the Enterprise Social Selling Framework divides enterprise implementation into three phases. The pre-launch phase covers planning, including defining key performance indicators and preparing the CRM system to track leads generated from the program. The execution phase onboards participants by creating their profiles and coaching them on publishing content, prospecting, and engaging with buyers. The post-launch phase provides ongoing support to participants and tracks the program's results against its key performance indicators.

== See also ==
- Multi-level Marketing
- Social CRM
