= Origami Owl =

American multi-level marketing company

- Company type: Direct sales
- Industry: Jewelry
- Founded: 2010
- Founders: Isabella "Bella" Weems; Christian "Chrissy" Weems; Tyson Basha; Shawn Maxwell
- Headquarters: Chandler, Arizona, United States
- Area served: U.S.; Canada; Puerto Rico
- Revenue: $250 million (2013); $24 million (2012); $280,000 (2011)
- Number of employees: 373 (2013)
- Website: thinkgoodness.com

Origami Owl is an American privately owned multi-level marketing custom jewelry company operating in the U.S., Puerto Rico, and Canada. The company was founded in 2010 by Isabella "Bella" Weems at the age of 14. The company has over 60,000 independent sales consultants who buy materials and tools from the company and sell products to individuals, primarily at in-house sales parties. The main product is the "Living Locket", a clear-faced hollow pendant which can be filled with a variety of charms that are meant to tell a story.

== History ==
At age 14, Isabella "Bella" Weems founded the company in 2010 with the help of her parents, Chrissy and Warren Weems. Intending to generate enough money to buy a car for her 16th birthday, Weems used $350 she saved from babysitting and $350 her parents gave her to start her company. Her mother agreed to be her business partner, though she currently is not employed by the company.

Weems originally used vintage glass lockets purchased online and pieces of jewelry, gems, and others objects to fill them. Chrissy and Bella Weems began selling the lockets at parties at their home and in 2011 rented a kiosk in the mall to sell from. Unable to pay rent, they received a loan from a family friend that allowed them to continue their business long enough to generate enough revenue. After one and a half years, they transformed the company into a direct sales model.

== Business ==
The company runs a direct sales model that uses independent sales consultants. The company sells materials and tools to the consultants and receives a percentage of their profits. As of 2015, the company sells through more than 60,000 independent sales consultants (which the company calls "independent designers"), primarily using in-home parties. Consultants buy kits from the company, including chains, charms, and lockets, and make their own jewelry to sell.

The company is owned by the Weems family and a number of executives were members of the family. Weems' uncle John Weems was vice president of IT and Weems' aunt, Jessica Reinhart, worked in marketing. Weems' uncle, Jeff Reinhart, is COO. Jeff Reinhart replaced John Weems as COO. Though Isabella Weems founded the company, she worked as an intern for it after high school graduation. Chrissy Weems, Bella's mother, is the current President and Co-founder of the company.

Weems designed and produced the company's first line of products, including its main product, the "Living Locket". The lockets are clear, hollow pendants which can be filled with a selection of charms. The charms are meant to allow individuals to "tell their own story with a locket."

In 2015, the company expanded its operations into Canada. In June 2015, Brett Blake replaced Robin Crossman as the company's CEO. In July 2017, Chrissy Weems became CEO.
