= Zane's Cycles =

Bicycle store in Branford, Connecticut, U.S.

Zane's Cycles is a New England bicycle store located in Branford, Connecticut, started by Christopher J. Zane in October 1981, at the age of 16. Since then, the store has grown from a local bicycle and hobby shop, to the largest P&I (Premiums and Incentives) distributor of bicycles in the United States. After several acquisitions, Zane's Inc. now supplies more than 65 premium household brands to the P&I industry.

The story of Zane's growth from small shop owner to major distributor found its way into several major business publications and college courses on marketing. Inc. and Fortune magazines both wrote positively of his aggressive local strategies, labeling them in some cases as "guerrilla marketing". An example was his tactic of purchasing competitor's phone numbers after putting them out of business.

In another quite opposite strategy, his focus on establishing a bond with the customer through simple gestures—like selling children's helmets at dealer cost, and offering lifetime guarantees—was a topic in an article by the Harvard Business Review.

Christopher Zane authored Reinventing the Wheel, the science of creating lifetime customers, BenBella, 2011. The book is a case study of Zane's Cycle growth by continuously improving the customer experience and customer service. Zane presents internationally at conferences, universities, and corporate meetings on the topic of extraordinary customer service and Customer Lifetime Value (clv).
