= Big Machine =

Big Machine may refer to:

- Big Machine Records, an American record label, a flagship property of the Big Machine Label Group
- "Big Machine" (Goo Goo Dolls song), a song by the Goo Goo Dolls
- "Big Machine" (Velvet Revolver song), a song by Velvet Revolver
- Big Machine (album), a 2003 album by B'z
- The Big Machine, a 2009 album by Émilie Simon
- BigMachines a software company, now part of Oracle
- Big Machine, a 2009 novel by Victor LaValle
