= Saigon Social =

Vietnamese restaurant in Manhattan, New York

- Interactive map of Saigon Social

Restaurant information
- Established: March 2020
- Owner: Helen Nguyen
- Head chef: Helen Nguyen
- Food type: Vietnamese
- Location: 172 Orchard Street, Manhattan, New York, 10002, United States
- Coordinates: 40.7215°N 73.9884°W
- Website: saigonsocialnyc.com

Saigon Social is a Vietnamese restaurant in the Lower East Side of New York City. Founded by Helen Nguyen, it offers modernized Vietnamese fare, including a pho which uses a "nontraditional traditional" broth which uses dry-aged beef.

The Infatuation called Saigon Social one of the best Vietnamese restaurants in the city, giving it an 8.5 out of 10, and The New York Times gave it two out of four stars, labeling it a Critic's Pick. The Times also named Nguyen's banh beo chen as one of the city's top seven dishes in 2022. The same year, Resy named it to their June Hit List.

== History ==
Prior to the COVID-19 pandemic, Nguyen ran Saigon Social as a pop-up offering modernized Vietnamese fare.

Originally, a permanent brick-and-mortar location was planned for early 2020, but it was delayed by the pandemic; Nguyen's business also faced challenges from vandalism, hate crimes, and staff turnover, among other factors.

Instead, during the pandemic, Nguyen opened a takeout window on Orchard Street, offering free, discounted pho to those in need, while also delivering food to frontline workers and elders in the community. In addition to takeout and delivery, Saigon Social also catered to stay afloat.

In March 2022, Nguyen reopened Saigon Social for indoor seating. Just months later, a fire broke out in the restaurant while she was away. Fashion designer Philip Lim and food writer Hannah Pham helped Nguyen fundraise on GoFundMe, raising over $79,000 for a recovery effort. It reopened a month later.

In April 2025, Nguyen told ABC 7 that the Trump tariffs caused her to rethink her menu due to its reliance on ingredients imported from Vietnam, a country among the hardest hit by incoming legislation. Many of her suppliers also told her that "they may stop sending some ingredients altogether."
