= ShareMethods =

Document management and collaboration service

ShareMethods is a Web 2.0 document management and collaboration service with a focus on sales, marketing, and the extended selling network. It offers a software as a service (SaaS) subscription to companies and is available as a stand-alone application or as an integrated program with CRM tools such as Oracle CRM On Demand or salesforce.com.

== History ==
ShareMethods was launched in 2004 to provide collaboration and communication services for sales and marketing teams, business partners, and customers. The founders have a background of building software-as-a-service applications and creating digital media applications.

- In September 2005, ShareMethods launched "ShareNow" as one of the first applications on the salesforce.com AppExchange.
- In September 2006, ShareMethods moved its operations into a SAS 70 Type II data center owned by SunGard.
- In March 2009, ShareMethods launched "ShareSpaces" to provide on-demand portals or workspaces. In 2013, ShareMethods announced that its platform is available in a private cloud (on-premises) version.

== Products ==
ShareMethods: Combines document management, collaboration, analytics, and CRM integration into a single solution. Key content can be centrally managed and delivered to sales channels, while providing feedback to marketing. ShareMethods is often used as a sales portal for internal sales and a partner portal for external partners.

ShareNow: Integrates ShareMethods with salesforce.com providing Single Sign On for salesforce.com users and access to files related to accounts opportunities, etc. including custom objects. Also facilitates collaboration between salesforce.com users and non-users.

ShareMethods for Oracle CRM On Demand: Integrates ShareMethods with Oracle CRM On Demand providing Single Sign On for Oracle users and easy access to files related to accounts opportunities, etc.

ShareOffice: An on-demand intranet/extranet solution. Features include full-text search, version history, server sync-up, email updates, audit trail/analytics, check-in/check-out, multilingual user interface.

ShareSpaces: Independent workspaces or portals where users can collaborate with business partners, teammates, or individuals to work together on content and documents.

== Integration and interoperability ==
ShareMethods is available on Salesforce.com's AppExchange platform. ShareMethods also integrates with Oracle CRM On Demand to provide document management within the CRM application. Customers also can integrate proprietary systems via single-sign-on and self-registration. In addition, developers can make use of the ShareMethods API based on WebDAV to integrate document management functionality.
