= Healthcare CRM =

Healthcare CRM, also known as Healthcare Relationship Management, is a broadly used term for a Customer relationship management system, or CRM, used in healthcare. Patient acquisition and intake automation are among the most common use cases for Healthcare CRM, helping providers reduce appointment no-shows and streamline the patient onboarding process.

There are three (3) generally recognized forms of CRM: Sales, Marketing, and Service

- Sales force automation is focused on the sales of lab services, medical devices, pharmaceuticals, and referrals
- Marketing automation facilitates community and brand outreach, supporting the above sales functions as well as targeting patient populations
- Service automation automates the provision of services and the delivery of healthcare to individual patients, and is a key component of Telehealth and Digital Health.

== Healthcare CRM Similarities and Differences from other CRMs ==
A Healthcare CRM shares the underlying components and structure of other CRMs. This includes communication automation and analysis across email, telephone, and social/internet mediums. It integrates emails, documents, jobs, faxes, and scheduling. Likewise, newer CRM entrants are provided as a software-as-a-service platform and are hosted in the cloud (see Salesforce.com and Keona Health).

The differences from traditional CRMs are based on fitting a healthcare organization’s unique requirements and structure:

- Healthcare CRM and all automated communication must meet government security and privacy standards. With the United States this requires HIPAA and HITECH compliance.
- Healthcare CRM specifically integrates with the healthcare organization’s Electronic Health Record, or EHR, which is respected as the source of truth for medical data.
- Healthcare CRMs incorporate Clinical Decision Support Systems to maintain patient safety.
- Healthcare CRM service automation automates healthcare specific services, such as provider scheduling, patient intake, and nurse triage making Healthcare service CRMs the most healthcare-unique form of CRM.

== Service Automation ==
Healthcare CRM service automation focuses on the provisioning and delivery of services to patients. Through service automation, patients are supported across multiple channels for self-scheduling, communication, facilitate intake and registration, navigation, care coordination with remote monitoring, and other patient-driven service coordination.

=== Contact Center Automation ===
The goal of healthcare contact center automation in healthcare is to increase quality, decrease cost, and track key performance indicators (KPI). This is accomplished by step-by-step scripting and call handling guidance combined with EHR integration and Practice Management (PM) integration that presents the caller’s complete history and context to users. The KPIs collected are user performance and industry customer experience metrics.

=== Safety and Escalation Automation ===
Because so many health issues have the potential of providing health and safety risk, a variety of clinical decision support (CDS) tools are needed to help maintain safety. Before an appointment is scheduled or a refill service is provided, a review of patient symptoms is needed to validate that the actions being taken are likely safe for the patient or those around them (e.g. COVID screening. At the simplest end, “red flag lists” are simple checks that patients and non-clinical agents can use to screen for potential emergent or urgent scenarios. More sophisticated natural language symptom checkers incorporate natural language processing with clinical guidance for patients or non-clinical agents who are scheduling. Nurse Triage guidelines assist nurses with completing medical assessments and arriving at a disposition.

=== Scheduling Automation ===
The goal of scheduling automation is to reduce scheduling errors and improve the provider and patient experience with smooth visits, while reducing costs. Scheduling automation typically works by embedding visit criteria into the software and removing the underlying complexity from the view of the end-user. This automation allows centralization of scheduling functions without forcing standardization (i.e. elimination of individual provider requirements) from scheduling.

=== Intake and Registration Automation ===
The goal of intake and registration automation is to make registering with a provider by a patient easier and smoother. Patient intake and registration are processes whereby patient demographics, health history, legal consents, and payment means are collected so the patient can be “registered” with a healthcare provider.

=== Location-based Services ===
Location-based services assist in locating the closest provider, navigating to the appointment, and can also facilitate in emergency services to the client’s location. The goal of incorporating these into the CRM is to smooth the delivery of service and increase patient safety.

=== Messaging Automation ===
The goal of messaging automation is to maintain professional standards, automate next steps and reminders, and reinforce care advice and health education while lowering the communication burden on users. Messaging automation in a Healthcare CRM includes HIPAA compliant secure messaging over email, fax, SMS, and web chat.

=== Remote Monitoring ===
The goal of remote patient monitoring is to supplement remote care with remote data collection and also to incorporate alerts for better care, health, and safety of patients. Remote monitoring is the collection of data.

== See also ==
- Clinical Decision Support
- Customer Relationship Management
- Digital Health
- Electronic Health Record
- Practice Management Software
- Remote Patient Monitoring
- Service Management
- Telehealth
