= Gary Vaynerchuk =

American businessman (born 1975)

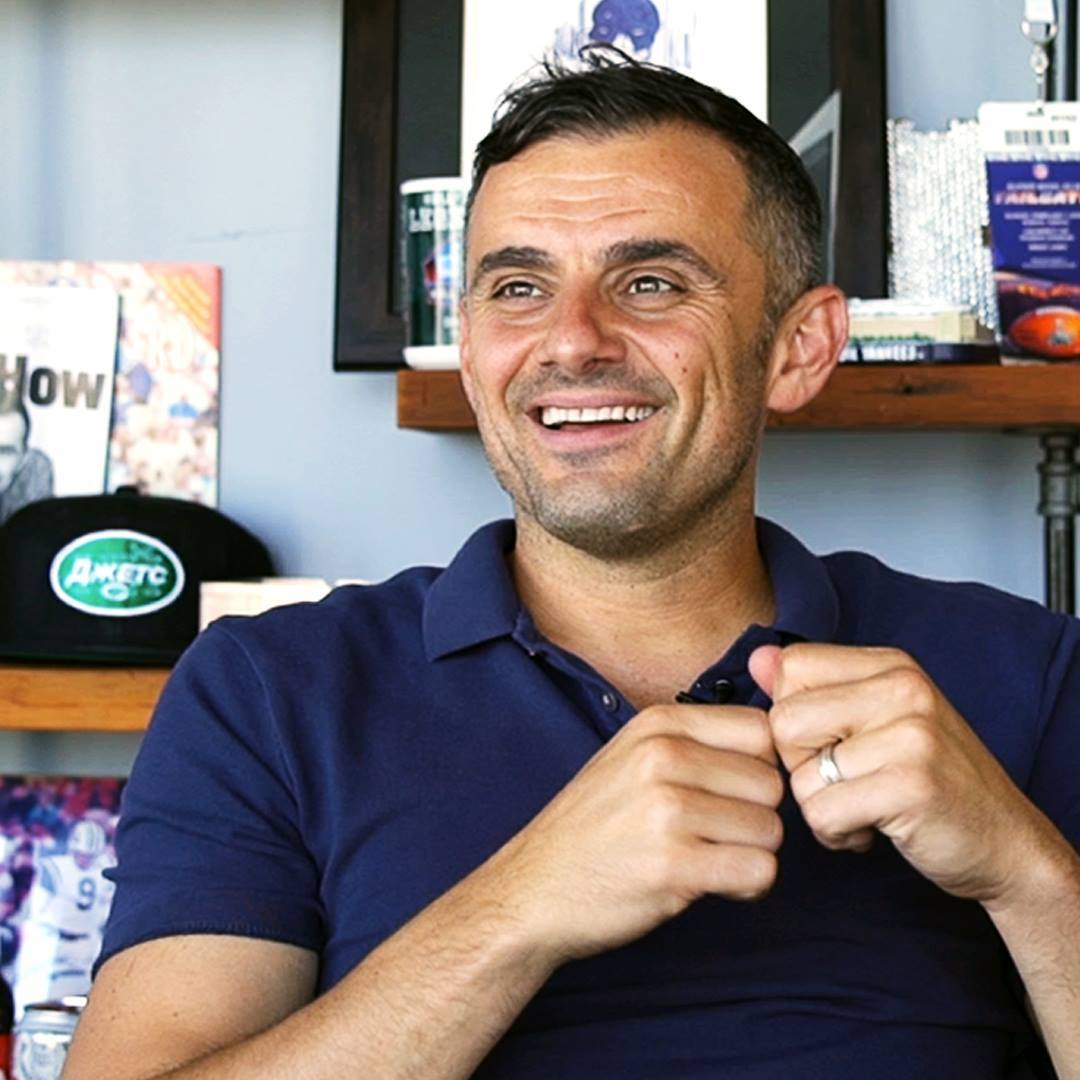
- Vaynerchuk in February 2017
- Born: Gennady Alexandrovich Vaynerchuk; November 14, 1975 (age 50); Babruysk, Byelorussian SSR, Soviet Union
- Other name: Gary Vee
- Citizenship: United States
- Known for: Entrepreneurship; social media; angel investing; enology
- Notable work: VaynerX, Wine Library TV, Resy, Empathy Wines
- Website: garyvaynerchuk.com

Gary Vaynerchuk (born Gennady Alexandrovich Vaynerchuk, (Note: Russian: Геннадий Александрович Вайнерчук, romanized: Gennady Aleksandrovich Vaynerchuk; Belarusian: Генадзь Аляксандравіч Вайнярчук, romanized: Hyenadz’ Alyaksandravich Vaynyarchuk) November 14, 1975; commonly known by his alias Gary Vee) is an American businessman, author, speaker, and internet personality. He is a co-founder of the restaurant reservation software company, Resy, and Empathy Wines. First known as a wine critic who expanded his family's wine business, Vaynerchuk is now more known for his work in digital marketing and social media as the chairman of New York–based communications company VaynerX, and as CEO of VaynerX subsidiary VaynerMedia.

== Early life ==
Gennady Alexandrovich Vaynerchuk was born on November 14, 1975, in Babruysk in the Soviet Union (today part of Belarus), and arrived via the U.S. Refugee Resettlement to New York City in the United States in 1978 at the age of three. He is of Ashkenazi Jewish descent. Vaynerchuk was raised in New York City's Queens borough and later moved to Edison, New Jersey. At age 14, he joined his family's retail-wine business. After his family moved, he graduated from North Hunterdon High School.

In 1998, Vaynerchuk graduated with a bachelor's degree in management science from Mount Ida College in Newton, Massachusetts.

== Career ==
=== Resy ===
Vaynerchuk co-founded restaurant reservation app Resy, which was acquired by American Express in 2019. He is also a co-founder of winery Empathy Wines, which was acquired by Constellation Brands in 2020. Vaynerchuk is the creator and founder behind the VeeFriends1 and VeeFriends2 non-fungible token series.

=== Wine Library ===
After graduating from college in 1998, Vaynerchuk assumed responsibility of his father's liquor store, Shopper's Discount Liquors. He renamed the store Wine Library, launched sales online, and in 2006, started Wine Library TV, a daily webcast on YouTube covering wine. He grew the business from $3 million a year to $60 million a year. In August 2011, Vaynerchuk stepped away from the wine business to build VaynerMedia, a digital ad agency.

=== VaynerX ===
Vaynerchuk is the chairman of VaynerX, a communications company that holds media properties and technology companies.

==== VaynerMedia ====
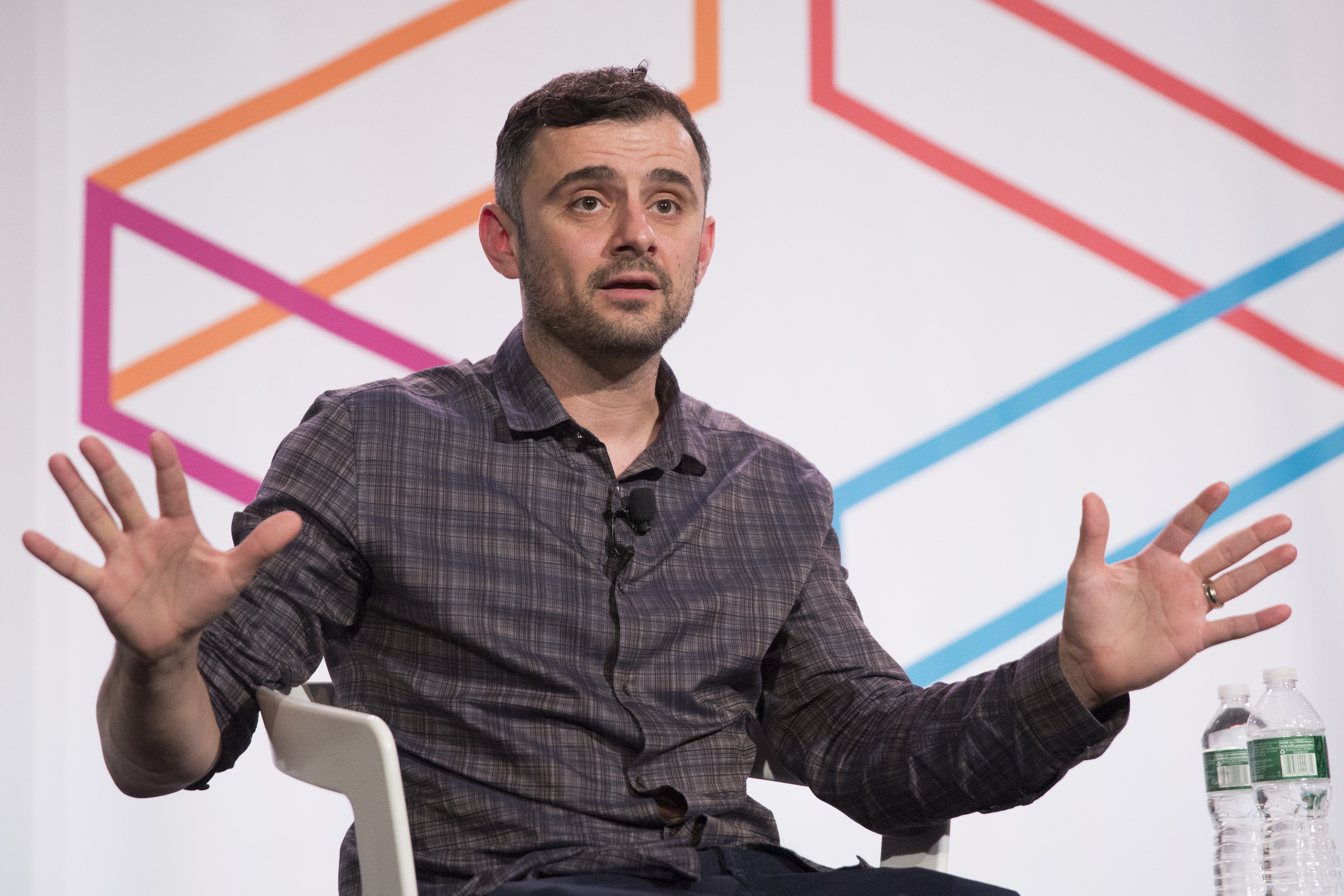
Gary Vaynerchuk at Internet Week 2015 in New York

In 2009, Vaynerchuk and his brother AJ Vaynerchuk founded VaynerMedia, a social-media-focused digital agency. The company provides social media and strategy services to Fortune 500 companies. In 2015, VaynerMedia was named one of Ad Age's A-List agencies. With 600 employees in 2016, VaynerMedia grossed $100 million in revenue. The company also partnered with Vimeo to connect brands and filmmakers for digital content.

==== Gallery Media Group ====
In 2017, Vaynerchuk formed The Gallery, later renamed Gallery Media Group, a VaynerX subsidiary company that houses PureWow, male-oriented news outlet ONE37pm.com, and other media properties.

== Media ==
=== Planet of the Apps ===
In February 2017, Vaynerchuk was a participant of Planet of the Apps, a reality television series, with will.i.am, Jessica Alba and Gwyneth Paltrow. In the show, Vaynerchuk and the team evaluated pitches from app developers vying for investment.

=== YouTube shows and videos ===
Vaynerchuk hosted a video blog on YouTube called Wine Library TV (WLTV or The Thunder Show) from 2006 to 2011, featuring wine reviews, tastings, and wine advice. The show debuted in February 2006. At 1,000 episodes in 2011, Vaynerchuk retired the show and replaced it with a video podcast called The Daily Grape.

In 2010, Vaynerchuk launched Wine & Web on SiriusXM satellite radio. The show's programming paired new wine tastings in a "Wine of the Week" segment with coverage of gadgets, trends and startups in its "Web of the Week" segment.

In 2014, Vaynerchuk launched The #AskGaryVee Show on YouTube to answer questions from Twitter and Instagram about entrepreneurship, family, and business topics. The show led to Vaynerchuk's fourth book, AskGaryVee: One Entrepreneur's Take on Leadership, Social Media, and Self-Awareness which reached The New York Times Best Seller list.

DailyVee was a daily, video-documentary series on YouTube hosted by Vaynerchuk. Started in 2015, he recorded interviews with other businessmen and broadcasts investor meetings and strategy sessions at VaynerMedia.

New Media Expo 2008

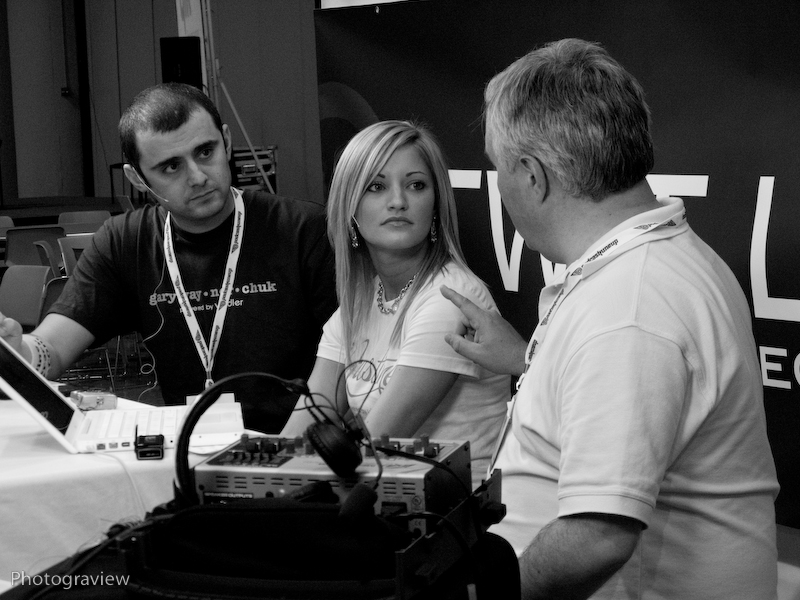
with iJustine and Leo Laporte

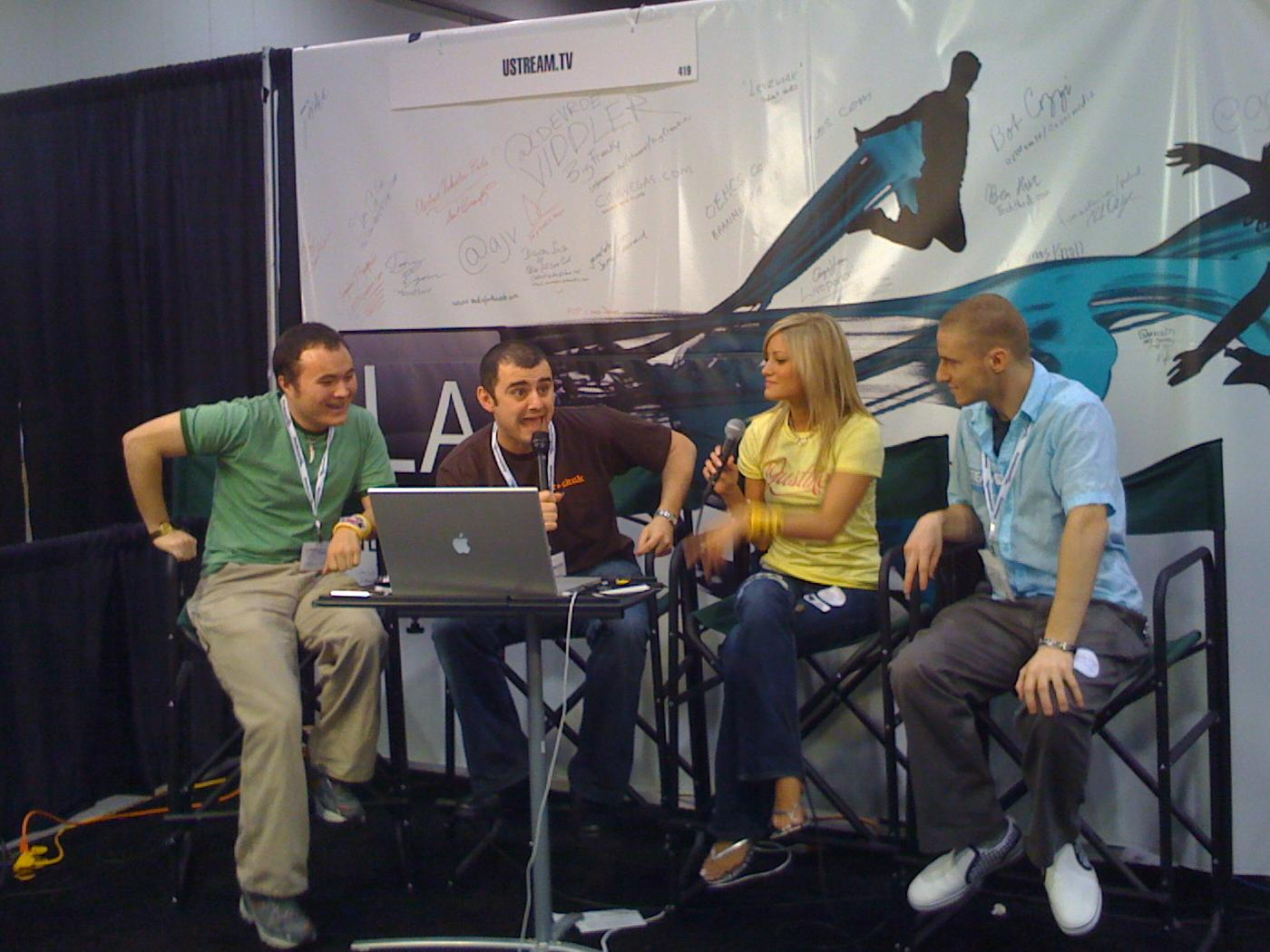
with Ben Parr, Ezarik, et al.

== Reception ==
Vaynerchuk has earned a social-media following for his mentorship. However, critics have called him a snake oil salesman.

Some commentators have criticized Vaynerchuk because of his high-energy, self-promotional style, and his "hustle"-focused approach.

In 2015, Vaynerchuk was named to Crain's New York Business 40 Under 40. In 2017, Vaynerchuk was listed as one of Forbes' Top Social Influencers.

== Works ==
- Gary Vaynerchuk's 101 Wines: Guaranteed to Inspire, Delight, and Bring Thunder to Your World (2008) ISBN 1594868824
- Crush It!: Why NOW Is the Time to Cash In on Your Passion (2009) ISBN 0061914177
- The Thank You Economy (2011) ISBN 0061914185
- Jab, Jab, Jab Right Hook (2013) ISBN 1594868824
- #AskGaryVee: One Entrepreneur's Take on Leadership, Social Media, and Self-Awareness Hardcover (2016) ISBN 0062273124
- Crushing It! How Great Entrepreneurs Build Their Business and Influence—and How You Can, Too (2018) ISBN 0062674692
- Twelve and a Half: Leveraging the Emotional Ingredients Necessary for Business Success (2021) ISBN 0062674684
- Day Trading Attention: How to Actually Build Brand and Sales in the New Social Media World (2024) ISBN 9780063317598
- Meet Me in the Middle (2024) ISBN 978-0063320291
