= Agile Software Corporation =

American product lifecycle management software company

- Type: Subsidiary
- Industry: Software, Product lifecycle management
- Founded: California, United States (1995)
- Headquarters: San Jose, California, United States
- Key people: Jay B. Fulcher, CEO; Bryan D. Stolle, Founder/Chairman
- Products: Agile PLM
- Number of employees: 689 (2006)
- Parent: Oracle Corporation
- Website: Oracle Agile PLM

Agile Software Corporation was an American software company headquartered in San Jose, California, specialising in product lifecycle management (PLM) software. Founded in 1995, it developed tools that helped manufacturers track product data, compliance requirements and supply chain information across a product's development and production lifecycle. Oracle Corporation acquired the company in 2007 for approximately $495 million, after which its products were rebranded as Oracle Agile PLM and integrated into Oracle's broader supply chain management suite.

== History ==
Agile Software Corporation was founded in California in 1995 by Bryan D. Stolle, who served as the company's chairman. It built its business supplying PLM software primarily to electronics, high-technology and life sciences manufacturers, sectors where managing complex bills of materials, component sourcing, regulatory compliance and design revisions across global supply chains was a significant operational challenge. The company operated as a publicly traded company on NASDAQ.

In February 2005, Agile Software acquired Cimmetry Systems Corporation, a privately owned software developer specialising in enterprise visualization tools, for approximately US$41.5 million in cash. Cimmetry became a wholly owned subsidiary and its technology was integrated into Agile's product set.

On 15 May 2007, Oracle Corporation announced it would acquire Agile Software Corporation through a cash merger at US$8.10 per share, valuing the deal at approximately US$495 million. The acquisition completed on 16 July 2007, and Agile became a wholly owned Oracle subsidiary. Oracle subsequently used the acquisition to strengthen its Oracle Cloud PLM offering within the Oracle Cloud SCM suite.

== See also ==
List of acquisitions by Oracle
