= Braina =

Intelligent personal assistant & dictation software

- Developer: Brainasoft
- Operating system: Windows, macOS
- Available in: English
- Type: Virtual assistant; Intelligent agent; Artificial intelligence; Chatbot; Large language model; Generative pre-trained transformer; Natural language interface; Transcription software; Speech synthesis; Speech recognition
- License: Proprietary
- Website: www.brainasoft.com/braina/

Braina is a virtual assistant, a large language model inference tool, and a speech-to-text dictation application developed by Brainasoft. Braina uses natural language interface, speech synthesis, and speech recognition technology to interact with its users and allows them to use natural language sentences to perform various tasks on a computer. The name Braina is a short form of "Brain Artificial".

Braina is marketed as a Microsoft Copilot alternative. It provides a voice interface for several locally run and cloud large language models, including the latest LLMs from providers such as OpenAI, Anthropic, Google, xAI, Meta, Mistral, etc; while improving data privacy. Braina also allows responses from its in-house large language models like Braina Swift and Braina Pinnacle. It has an "Artificial Brain" feature that provides persistent memory support for supported LLMs.

== Features ==
Braina provides is able to carry out various tasks on a computer, including automation. Braina can take commands inputted through typing or through dictation to store reminders, find information online, perform mathematical operations, open files, generate images from text, transcribe speech, and control open windows or programs. Braina adapts to user behavior over time with a goal of better anticipating needs.

=== Speech-to-text dictation ===
Braina Pro can type spoken words into an active window at the location of a user's cursor. Its speech recognition technology supports more than 100 languages and dialects and is able to isolate the recognition of a user's voice from disturbing environmental factors such as background noise, other human voices, or external devices. Braina can also be taught to dictate uncommon legal, medical, and scientific terms. Users can also teach Braina uncommon names and vocabulary. Users can edit or correct dictated text without using a keyboard or mouse by giving built-in voice commands.

=== Text-to-speech ===
Braina can read aloud selected texts, such as e-books.

=== Custom commands and automation ===
Braina can automate computer tasks. It lets users create custom voice commands to perform tasks such as opening files, programs, websites, or emails, as well as executing keyboard or mouse macros.

=== Transcription ===
Braina can transcribe media file formats such as WAV, MP3, and MP4 into text.

=== Notes and reminders ===
Braina can store and recall notes and reminders. These can include scheduled or unscheduled commands, checklist items, alarms, chat conversations, memos, website snippets, bookmarks, contacts.

=== Image and Video generation ===
Braina supports AI image and video generation from text and image inputs via generative cloud AI models. Supported models include OpenAI's GPT Image, ByteDance's Seedance, Black Forest Labs' FLUX.2, Google's Veo and Nano Banana Pro, Kuaishou's Kling, and xAI's Grok Imagine Image/Video, among others.

== Platforms ==
In addition to the desktop version for Windows and macOS operating systems, Braina is also available for the iOS and Android operating systems.

The mobile version of Braina has a feature allowing remote management of a PC connected via Wi-Fi.

== Distributions ==
Braina is distributed in multiple modes. These include Braina Lite, a freeware version with limitations, and premium versions Braina Pro, Pro Plus, and Pro Ultra.

Some additional features in the Pro version include dictation, custom vocabulary, video transcription, automation, custom voice commands, and persistent LLM memory.
