= Customer equity =

Total combined customer lifetime values of all of the company's customers

Customer equity is the total combined customer lifetime values of all of the company's customers. It is calculated by multiplying the number of customers by the average value of each customer. Customer equity is important because it reflects the potential future revenue that a company can generate from its existing customer base.

== Overview ==
In deciding the value of a company, it is important to know of how much value its customer base is in terms of future revenues. The greater the customer equity (CE), the more future revenue in the lifetime of its clients; this means that a company with a higher customer equity can get more money from its customers on average than another company that is identical in all other characteristics. As a result, a company with higher customer equity is more valuable than one without it. It includes customers' goodwill and extrapolates it over the lifetime of the customers.

The term is a misnomer since the term has nothing to do with the traditional meaning of equity.

There are three drivers to customer equity, all of which refer to three sides of the same thing:

1. Value equity: What the customer assesses the value of the product or service provided by the company to be;
2. Brand equity: What the customer assesses the value of the brand is, above its objective value;
3. Retention equity: The tendency of the customer to stick with the brand even when it is priced higher than an otherwise equal product;

== Customer equity strategy ==
Companies often attempt to gain more customers and increase revenues by improving customer equity. They do this by:

- improving consumer service
- improving the value or desirability of the brand
- improving goodwill
- improving brand popularity such as by advertisements
- improving the trust of the customer towards the brand.

== See also ==
- Net worth
- Ownership equity
- Customer service
- Customer
- Customer relationship management
- Customer value proposition

== Literature ==
- Rust, Roland T.; Lemon, Katherine N.; Zeithaml, Valarie A.: Return on Marketing: Using Customer Equity to Focus Marketing Strategy, Journal of Marketing 68(1), 2004, 109-127
