= Resy =

American technology organization

Resy Network, Inc.
- Type: Subsidiary
- Founded: 2014; 12 years ago
- Founders: Gary Vaynerchuk; Ben Leventhal; Michael Montero
- Headquarters: New York City
- Area served: International
- Products: Restaurant reservation app
- Parent: American Express
- Website: resy.com

Resy is an American online restaurant-reservation service company founded in 2014 by Gary Vaynerchuk, Ben Leventhal, and Michael Montero. As of 2023, approximately 16,000 restaurants globally can be booked through Resy. Resy was acquired by American Express in 2019.

== History ==
Resy was founded in 2014 by Ben Leventhal, co-founder of Eater.com, Michael Montero, co-founder of CrowdTwist, and entrepreneur Gary Vaynerchuk. In January 2017 the company raised $13 million from Airbnb, First Data Corporation and earlier investors RSE Ventures and Lerer Hippeau Ventures. In April 2018, Resy enabled participating restaurants to list their properties on Airbnb through Resy's booking system and also acquired ClubKviar, a restaurant-booking platform in Spain. In 2018, Resy acquired a competitor, Reserve, a reservation app launched by Garrett Camp's incubator, Expa.

== Acquisition ==
In 2019, American Express acquired Resy and integrated it into its mobile app as an offering for some rewards card members.

== Shut down ==
In January 2024, it was announced that the platform would shut down its UK operations by the end of August 2024.

== See also ==
- List of websites about food and drink
