= DN Capital =

- Type: Private
- Industry: Venture capital
- Founded: 2000; 26 years ago
- Founders: Nenad Marovac and Steve Schlenker
- Headquarters: London, United Kingdom
- Number of locations: List: London, United Kingdom; Menlo Park, California, U.S.; Berlin, Germany
- Products: Venture capital, growth capital
- Total assets: $600 million
- Website: www.dncapital.com

DN Capital is an international venture capital firm headquartered in London that invests in technology companies. It was founded in 2000 by Nenad Marovac and Steve Schlenker, two Harvard Business School classmates.

== Investments and exits ==
DN Capital has raised approximately $600 million. Among other roles, the firm looks to help US companies enter the European market.

The firm's notable exits include:

- Shazam (acquired by Apple for approximately $400 million)
- Datanomic (acquired by Oracle)
- Quandoo (acquired by Japan's Recruit Holdings for $219 million)
- Kana (acquired by Verint Systems for $514 million)
- Apsmart (acquired by Thomson Reuters)
- Endeca (acquired by Oracle for $1.1 billion)
- Purplebricks (LSE: PURP)
