= Endeca =

American software company

Endeca Technologies Inc.
- Type: Private
- Industry: Information technology Information access
- Founded: 1999
- Headquarters: Cambridge, Massachusetts, United States
- Area served: Worldwide
- Key people: Steve Papa (CEO)
- Parent: Oracle Corporation

Endeca was a software company headquartered in Cambridge, Massachusetts, that sold eCommerce search, customer experience management, enterprise search and business intelligence applications.

Endeca was founded in 1999 as Optigrab. It was a privately held company, backed by venture capital investment from Bessemer, DN Capital founders Steve Schlenker and Nenad Marovac, Ampersand, GGV, In-Q-Tel, Intel, SAP and Venrock.

On October 18, 2011, Oracle Corporation announced its acquisition of Endeca for $1.075B.

Endeca's product provided faceted search in the context of electronic commerce and online libraries.

== See also ==
- Oracle Advertising and Customer Experience (CX)
