= Customer profitability =

Customer profitability (CP) is the profit the firm makes from serving a customer or customer group over a specified period of time, specifically the difference between the revenues earned from and the costs associated with the customer relationship in a specified period. According to Philip Kotler, "a profitable customer is a person, household or a company that overtime, yields a revenue stream that exceeds by an acceptable amount the company's cost stream of attracting, selling and servicing the customer."

Calculating customer profit is an important step in understanding which customer relationships are better than others. Often, the firm will find that some customer relationships are unprofitable. The firm may be better off (more profitable) without these customers. At the other end, the firm will identify its most profitable customers and be in a position to take steps to ensure the continuation of these most profitable relationships. However, abandoning customers is a sensitive practice, and a business should always consider the public relations consequences of such actions.

== Purpose ==
Although CP was nothing more than the result of applying the business concept of profit to a customer relationship, measuring the profitability of a firm's customers or customer groups can often deliver useful business insights.

The purpose of the "customer profit" metric is to identify the profitability of individual customers. Companies commonly look at their performance in aggregate. A common phrase within a company is something like: "We had a good year, and the business units delivered $400,000 in profits." When customers are considered, it is often using an average such as "We made a profit of $2.50 a customer." Although these can be useful metrics, they sometimes disguise an important fact that not all customers are equal and some are unprofitable. Simply put, rather than measuring the "average customer," a company can find out what each customer contributes to the bottom line.

Quite often, a very small percentage of the firm's best customers will account for a large portion of firm profit. Although this is a natural consequence of variability in profitability across customers, firms benefit from knowing exactly who the best customers are and how much they contribute to firm profit.

At the other end of the distribution, firms sometimes find that their worst customers actually cost more to serve than the revenue they deliver. These unprofitable customers actually detract from overall firm profitability. The firm would be better off if they had never acquired these customers in the first place.

== Construction ==
Customer profitability is the difference between the revenues earned from and the costs associated with the customer relationship during a specified period. In theory, this is a trouble-free calculation to find out the cost to serve each customer and the revenues associated with each customer for a given period.

The biggest challenge in measuring customer profitability is the assignment of costs to customers. While it is usually clear what revenue each customer generated, it is often not clear at all what costs the firm incurred serving each customer. Activity based costing can sometimes be used to help determine the costs associated with each customer or customer group. For components of cost not directly related to serving customers, the calculation of customer profit must use some method to fully allocate these costs to customers if the total of customer profit is to match the operating profit of the firm. If the firm decides not to allocate these non-customer costs to customers, then the sum of customer profit will be greater than the operating profit of the firm.

== Cautions ==
Like other profit measures, customer profitability is historical. It is a financial summary of what happened in a previous period. And although the past is often indicative of the future, it is easy to imagine situations in which relationships that were unprofitable in the past might become profitable in the future (and vice versa). The forward-looking measure of the value to be derived by serving a customer is called customer lifetime value. Unprofitable customers can have high customer lifetime values (and vice versa).

== See also ==
- Customer lifetime value (CLV), a prediction of the net profit attributed to the entire future relationship with a customer.

== Other sources ==
- Kaplan, R.S. and V.G. Narayanan (2001), “Measuring and Managing Customer Profitability.” Journal of Cost Management (September/October): 5-15.
- Helgesen, Ø. (1999). "Customer Accounting and Customer Profitability Analysis — Some Theoretical Aspects and Some Empirical Evidence", SNF Working Paper, No. 67.
