= Social CRM =

Social CRM (customer relationship management) is the use of social media services, techniques and technology to enable organizations to engage with their customers.

== Applications ==
Social CRM has applications in marketing, customer service and sales, including:

- Social engagement with prospects: Social CRM tools allow businesses to better engage with their customers by, for example, listening to sentiments about their products and services.
- Social customer service: Ownership of social media is shifting away from Marketing and Communication as engagement increasingly relates to inbound customer service-based topics. Rather than social being seen purely as a space for companies to deliver outbound marketing messages, it is the inbound customer queries that allow for meaningful points of engagement and the building of brand advocacy.
- Personalized marketing strategy: The ability to create custom content is increasingly dependent on access to reliable, qualitative social user data to facilitate precise audience segmentation. Furthermore, dynamic audience segments, built on both social data and demographic data, allow for more accurate measurement of campaign KPIs.

== Traditional CRM ==
Traditional customer relationship management focuses on collecting and managing static customer data, such as past purchase information, contact history and customer demographics. This information is often sourced from email and phone interactions, commonly limited to direct interactions between the company and the customer.

Social CRM adds a deeper layer of information onto traditional CRM by adding data derived from social networks like Facebook, Twitter, LinkedIn or any other social network where a user publicly shares information. The key benefit of social CRM is the ability for companies to interact with customers in a multichannel retailing environment (commonly referred to as omnichannel) and talk to customers the way they talk to each other. Social CRM enables companies to track a customer's social influence and source data from conversations occurring outside of formal, direct communication. Social CRM also allows companies to keep a full audit history of all customer interactions, regardless of social channel they choose to use, available to all customer care employees.

== Social CRM metrics in applications ==
Metrics for building awareness:

- web traffic
- search volume trends
- volume of followers
- social mentions

Metrics for increasing sales:

- website traffic
- social mentions
- volume of followers
- repeat visits
- social content acceptance rate

Metrics for assessing changes environment in an industry:

- Share of Voice: how much of the overall voice a single brand consumes.

== See also ==
- Customer experience management
- Natural language processing
- Sentiment analysis
- Social analytics
- Social Selling
- Text analytics
- Text mining
- Unstructured data
- Voice of the customer
