= Buy Till you Die =

Class of statistical models

The Buy Till You Die (BTYD) class of statistical models are designed to capture the behavioral characteristics of non-contractual customers, or when the company is not able to directly observe when a customer stops being a customer of a brand. The goal is typically to model and forecast customer lifetime value.

BTYD models all jointly model two processes: (1) a repeat purchase process, that explains how frequently customers make purchases while they are still "alive"; and (2) a dropout process, which models how likely a customer is to churn in any given time period.

Common versions of the BTYD model include:

- The Pareto/NBD model, which models the dropout process as a Pareto Type II distribution and the purchase frequency process as a negative binomial distribution
- The Beta-Geometric/NBD model, which models the dropout process, as a geometric distribution with a beta mixing distribution, and models the purchase frequency process as a negative binomial distribution.

The concept was firstly introduced in 1987, in an article in Management Science, which concerns on counting and identifying those customers who are still active.
