= Farley file =

Set of records kept by politicians

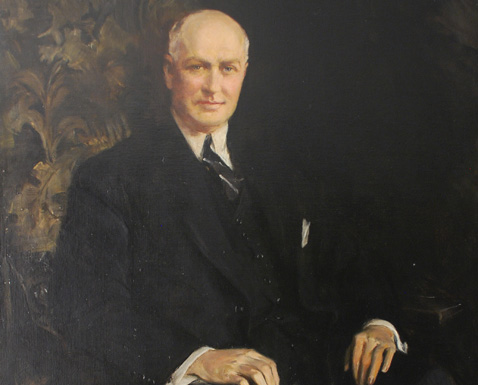
Official portrait of Farley, the 53rd Postmaster General

A Farley file is a set of records kept by politicians on people whom they have met.

The term is named for James Farley, Franklin Roosevelt's campaign manager. Farley, who went on to become Postmaster General and chairman of the Democratic National Committee, kept a file on everyone he or Roosevelt met.

Whenever people were scheduled to meet again with Roosevelt, Farley would review their files. That allowed Roosevelt to meet them again while knowing their spouse, their children's names and ages, and anything else that had come out of earlier meetings or any other intelligence that Farley had added to the file. The effect was powerful and intimate.

Farley files are now commonly kept by other politicians and businesspeople.

A predecessor may be Ancient Rome's nomenclator, "a slave who attended his master during canvassing and on similar occasions, for the purpose of telling him the names of those he met in the street."

== See also ==
- Customer relationship management
- Individual resource management
- Vizier
