= Siebel Systems =

American software company (1993–2006)

Siebel Systems, Inc.
- Traded as: Nasdaq: SEBL (1996–2006)
- Industry: Software and programming
- Founded: 1993; 33 years ago
- Defunct: 2006
- Fate: Acquired by Oracle
- Successor: Oracle
- Headquarters: San Mateo, California, United States
- Key people: Thomas Siebel, CEO; Patricia House, VP marketing
- Products: CRM application
- Revenue: ▼$1.340 bln (2004)
- Operating income: ▲$0.129 bln (2004)
- Net income: ▲$0.111 bln (2004)
- Number of employees: 5,036 (2005)
- Website: siebel.com at the Wayback Machine (archived 2001-11-01)

Siebel Systems, Inc. (/ˈsiːbəl/) was an American software company principally engaged in the design, development, marketing, and support of customer relationship management (CRM) applications—like Siebel CRM.

The company was founded by Thomas Siebel and Patricia House in 1993. At first promoting its sales force automation products, the company expanded into the broader CRM market. By the late 1990s, Siebel Systems was the dominant CRM vendor, peaking at 45% market share in 2002.

On September 12, 2005, Oracle Corporation announced it had agreed to buy Siebel Systems for $5.8 billion. "Siebel" is now a brand name owned by Oracle Corporation.

Siebel Systems is Oracle's on-premises CRM system, and Oracle's cloud applications for CRM are Oracle Advertising and Customer Experience (CX).

== History ==
Siebel Systems, Inc. began with sales force automation software, then expanded into marketing and customer service applications, including CRM. From the time it was founded in 1993, the company grew quickly.

Benefiting from the explosive growth of the CRM market in the late 1990s, Siebel Systems was named the fastest growing company in the United States in 1999 by Fortune magazine.

=== Thomas Siebel, Pat House ===
Siebel's "first experience with sales technology was in the late 1980s, when he worked for Oracle." At the time, Siebel Systems co-founder Patricia House also was working for Oracle. Siebel left Oracle to try his hand at a startup. In 1992 House left Oracle and together they worked on what became Siebel Systems (in 1993).

== Key dates ==
- 1993: Siebel Systems, Inc. is founded.
- 1995: Siebel delivers Siebel Sales Enterprise software for sales force automation.
- 1995: Siebel 2.0 (Release end of 1995)
- Siebel Customer Relationship Management (CRM)
- Siebel Sales Enterprise
- 1996: Siebel becomes a publicly traded company.
- 1997: Siebel 3.0 (Release Feb 1997)
- 1998: Siebel 98
- 1998: Siebel Systems acquires Scopus Technology, Inc. "for its customer-service and support products."
- 1999: Siebel 99
- 2000: Siebel 6 (also known as Siebel 2000)
- 2000: Siebel Systems acquires OnLink Technologies for its interactive selling and product configuration products.
- 2000: Revenue surpasses the $1 billion mark.
- 2001: Siebel 7.0 (Released 2001, was the first web-based version)
- 2002: Siebel 7.5 (Released in 2002)
- 2004: Siebel 7.7 (Released in 2004)
- 2005: Siebel 7.8 (Released in 2005)
- 2006: Oracle acquires Siebel Systems.
- 2007: Oracle Siebel 8.0 (Released in 2007)
- 2007: Oracle Business Intelligence Enterprise Edition Plus (released 2007)
- 2007: Oracle Business Intelligence Applications (Formerly Siebel Analytics) (released 2007)
- 2008: Oracle Siebel 8.1 (Released in 2008)
- 2011: Oracle Siebel 8.2 (Released in 2011)
- Oracle Sales Cloud
- Oracle Fusion CRM
- Oracle CRM On Demand
- 2015: Oracle Siebel 15.0 (Released 11 May 2015)
- 2016: Oracle Siebel 16.0 (Released 29 Apr 2016)
- 2017: Oracle Siebel 17.0 (Released 31 Jul 2017)
- 2018: Oracle Siebel 18.0 (Released 23 Jan 2018)
- 2019: Oracle Siebel 19.0 (Released 21 Jan 2019)
- 2020: Oracle Siebel 20.0 (Released 21 Jan 2020)
- 2021: Oracle Siebel 21.0 (Released 21 Jan 2021)
- 2022: Oracle Siebel 22.0 (Released 21 Jan 2022)

== See also ==
- Oracle Advertising and Customer Experience (CX)
- Oracle CRM
