= OctetString =

- Industry: Software Engineering
- Founded: 2000; 26 years ago
- Founder: Clayton Donley; Nathan Owen
- Defunct: November 16, 2005
- Fate: Acquired by Oracle Corporation
- Headquarters: Schaumburg, Illinois, United States
- Products: OctetString Virtual Directory

OctetString is a defunct software firm based in Schaumburg, Illinois, that published OctetString Virtual Directory (VDE), a LDAP based virtual directory product focused on the identity management segment of the security software market.

The company was founded in 2000 by Clayton Donley and Nathan Owen, two directory services engineers who left IBM to start the company. On November 16, 2005, the company was acquired by Oracle Corporation.
