= Art Technology Group =

Former independent internet technology company

Art Technology Group, Inc.
- Type: Subsidiary
- Traded as: Nasdaq: ARTG
- Industry: Software
- Founded: 1991; 35 years ago
- Founders: Jeet Singh and Joseph Chung
- Defunct: January 5, 2011
- Fate: Acquired by Oracle Corporation
- Successor: Oracle Commerce
- Headquarters: Cambridge, Massachusetts, United States
- Key people: Bob Burke (CEO)
- Products: eCommerce software
- Number of employees: 442 (2008)
- Parent: Oracle Corporation
- Website: www.oracle.com/us/corporate/Acquisitions/atg/

Art Technology Group (ATG) was an independent American internet technology company specializing in eCommerce software and on-demand optimization applications until its acquisition by Oracle on January 5, 2011.

After the acquisition, ATG continued to be based in Cambridge, Massachusetts and operated under its own name as a subsidiary of Oracle. The company was a provider of eCommerce software and related on-demand commerce optimization applications. ATG's products provided merchandising, marketing, content personalization, automated recommendations, and live-help services.

== History ==
ATG was cofounded in 1991 by Jeet Singh and Joseph "Joe" Taisup Chung, both graduates of MIT. Between 1991 and 1996, ATG delivered consulting services for building Web sites.

Around 1998, ATG transitioned to a software company offering several products including an Application Server and an e-commerce platform. In 1999, ATG made its initial public offering on the Nasdaq stock exchange.

Between 2000 and 2003, the company focused on commerce applications, business tools for content management, merchandising, marketing and analytics and shifted to industry standard application servers from IBM, BEA and JBoss. In 2004, the company acquired Primus Knowledge Solutions in a disputed acquisition that closed on November 1, 2004. The integration of the Primus applications onto the ATG Web marketing and ecommerce software platform was completed the following year, in 2005.

In 2006, ATG acquired eStara, a provider of click to call, chat and call tracking solutions. In 2008, it acquired privately held CleverSet; the transaction closed on February 6, 2008.

In 2010, ATG acquired privately held InstantService; the transaction closed on January 12, 2010.

Later in 2010, Oracle Corporation reaches an agreement with ATG to start the acquisition process of ATG into Oracle. The announcement of the acquisition agreement was made public on November 2, 2010. The acquisition was completed on January 5, 2011, for an estimated $1 billion, or $6.00 a share.

== See also ==
- Oracle Advertising and Customer Experience (CX)
