= Datanomic =

Software companies of the United Kingdom

- Type: Private
- Industry: Software
- Founded: 2001; 25 years ago in Cambridge, United Kingdom
- Defunct: 2011
- Fate: Acquired by Oracle
- Successor: Oracle Corporation
- Headquarters: Cambridge, United Kingdom
- Products: dn:Director
- Website: www.datanomic.com

Datanomic was a software engineering company based in Cambridge, England.

Founded in 2001, Datanomic developed data quality solutions. In 2006, Datanomic acquired Tranato and integrated Tranato's semantic profiling and parsing capabilities with Datanomic's data auditing and cleansing to produce a new data quality application. Launched in July 2007, dn:Director provided an end-to-end data quality tool kit encompassing, data profiling, auditing, cleansing and matching through a single graphical user interface and all written in Java.

Although dn:Director had capabilities to handle data quality issues in all kinds of data, Datanomic targeted its dn:Director application at business users with customer data quality challenges. It adopted a strategy of building "applications", consisting of pre-configured rules and reference data, on top of the data quality platform to address specific business issues.

Most successful of these was its Watchlist Screening application (in support of compliance with anti-money laundering and anti-terrorism know-your-customer regulation). This was adopted by clients including Barclays Bank, Bank of America, MetLife and Vodafone.

Datanomic was funded by private investors and venture capital companies 3i and DN Capital. Nenad Marovac, Founding Partner at DN Capital, supported a management-led buyout in 2009, meaning DN Capital, Datanomic Management and other previous investors acquired 3i’s shares.

In July 2011, Datanomic was acquired by Oracle Corporation, which announced it would combine Datanomic's technology with the Oracle product data quality capabilities it secured when it acquired Silver Creek Systems in 2010. The new combined suite is known as Oracle Enterprise Data Quality. Datanomic's compliance screening application has also been persisted as Oracle Watchlist Screening.
