= Direct selling =

Business model

Direct selling is a business model that involves a party of people buying products from a parent organization and selling them directly to customers. It can take the form of either single-level marketing (in which a direct seller makes money purely from sales) and multi-level marketing (in which the direct seller may earn money from both direct sales to customers and by sponsoring new direct sellers and earning a commission from their efforts).

According to the US Federal Trade Commission: "Direct selling is a blanket term that encompasses a variety of business forms premised on person-to-person selling in locations other than a retail establishment, such as social media platforms or the home of the salesperson or prospective customer."

Modern direct selling includes sales made through the party plan, one-on-one demonstrations, and other personal contact arrangements as well as internet sales. Some sources have defined direct selling as "the direct personal presentation, demonstration, and sale of products and services to consumers, usually in their homes or at their jobs".

== See also ==
- Account-based marketing
- Direct marketing
- Guanxi
- Lead generation
- Lead management
- Personal selling
- Relationship marketing
- Social selling
