= Oracle Advertising and Customer Experience =

Cloud-based marketing service

Oracle Advertising and Customer Experience (CX)
- Developer: Oracle Corporation
- Type: Customer relationship management software, Customer experience software
- License: Proprietary
- Website: www.oracle.com/cx/

Oracle Advertising and Customer Experience (CX) is a suite of cloud-based applications offered by Oracle Corporation that includes tools for advertising, marketing, sales, e-commerce, customer service.

== History ==
Oracle's first customer relationship management (CRM) product, Oracle CRM, was released in 1998. The product suite was later named Oracle Cloud CX. By 2021, Oracle CX had been combined with Oracle Data Cloud and became Oracle Advertising and Customer Experience (CX).

In 2006, Oracle purchased Siebel Systems, and later expanded its Siebel CRM software, and on-premises tool, with its SaaS product, Oracle CRM on Demand.

In 2012, the company acquired RightNow Technologies, and Eloqua. These acquisitions allowed Oracle to develop a suite of CX cloud-based software. The acquisition of BigMachines for CPQ in 2013, and TOA Technologies for field service in 2014, added more CX cloud-based capabilities. TOA provides end-to-end service tracking for employees and contractors working out in the field, and BigMachines focuses on sales processes.

In 2017, Oracle released its Adaptive Intelligent Applications (AI Apps) for its CX platform, with plans to expand AI functionality to all of its existing capabilities, including CX, HCM, ERP and supply chain. The applications access first-party data from a company's commerce cloud and combine it with third-party data from the Oracle Data Cloud (now Oracle Advertising) to give companies insights into customer behavior and purchasing decisions. Oracle also acquired Moat, an ad measurement company, in 2017.

In September 2019, Oracle released CX cloud application updates that included digital assistants for sales, service, and marketing teams; integration with Oracle DataFox; and capabilities for telecom and media customers, financial services customers, and public sector customers. In October 2019, the company acquired CrowdTwist, a customer loyalty platform, and merged it with Oracle's CX cloud. In November 2019, the company added customer data management (CDM) to its Service Cloud.

In March 2021, Red Bull Racing chose Oracle as its official cloud infrastructure partner. Under the partnership, Red Bull Racing uses Oracle's CX applications to give fans access to racing statistics and metrics. In 2022, the team name changed to Oracle Red Bull Racing.

In May 2021, Oracle released in-game measurement within Oracle Moat Measurement. It allows companies to measure the effectiveness of ads that appear in 3D video games. Oracle also updated its Subscription Management product.

== Applications ==
The following applications and products are included in Oracle Advertising and CX:

=== Oracle Advertising ===
Products include:

- Oracle Moat: allows advertisers to measure ad performance in 3D video games.
- Contextual Intelligence (formerly GrapeShot): provides brand safety and verification, as well as contextual targeting.
- OnRamp: an automated onboarding platform
- Audiences

=== Oracle Marketing ===
In 2012, Oracle acquired Eloqua (now Eloqua Marketing Automation), which gave the company more B2B capabilities. Then in 2013, it acquired Responsys, which became part of its B2C marketing. Responsys was integrated into what was then the Oracle Marketing Cloud and Oracle Customer Experience Cloud. As of 2021, it is now Oracle Responsys Campaign Management.

In September 2021, the company announced Oracle Fusion Marketing. This product uses artificial intelligence to automate the B2B marketing campaign and lead generation process.

Other marketing capabilities include:

- Content management
- Data management platform (DMP)
- Customer data platform
- Testing and optimization
- Behavioral intelligence
- Audience segmentation

=== Oracle Sales ===
The Sales' user interface supports smart lists, infolets, and an advanced search. Sales' tools support customer data management, sales cataloging, sales force automation, sales prediction, sales forecasting, analytics, and communication between sales teams and customers.

Other products include:

- Subscription management
- Sales automation
- Commerce
- Partner relationship management
- Configure, price, quote
- Sales force automation

=== Oracle Service ===
In February 2021, Service was updated with a new interface and data set. The application also added a digital customer service assistant. A May 2022 update allowed Service to embed data from the Oracle Unity Customer Data Platform.

Products include:

- Field service: Oracle acquired TOA Technologies, a field service specialist, in 2014.
- Knowledge management
- Intelligent advisor
