= CrowdTwist =

- Type: Private Company
- Founded: 1 August 2009
- Fate: Purchased by Oracle
- Headquarters: New York City
- Area served: Worldwide
- Key people: Scott Matthews (CEO); Josh Bowen (Co-Founder & Chief Corporate Development Officer)
- Website: www.crowdtwist.com

CrowdTwist was a privately held company headquartered in New York City, purchased by Oracle in 2019. Oracle CrowdTwist was a SaaS based omni-channel loyalty and analytics platform designed to allow marketers to acquire, engage and retain customers. The information gathered by CrowdTwist could be used and analyzed by companies to create customer profiles on both an individual and macro level. CrowdTwist investors included StarVest Partners, SoftBank Capital, Fairhaven Capital, KBS+P Ventures and Bertelsmann Digital Media Investments. Scott Matthews served as CrowdTwist's chief executive officer.

== History ==
=== Beginnings ===
CrowdTwist was founded in August 2009 by Irving Fain, Josh Bowen and Mike Montero. Fain and Bowen previously worked together at Clear Channel Digital, where Bowen was in charge of analytics and Fain oversaw the company's digital marketing and social platforms. They also supervised Clear Channel's marketing loyalty program. While at Clear Channel, the two decided to create a brand loyalty program that would encompass both online and offline activities. Bowen, in his previous work at MTV, had realized that few music artists truly knew their fans and believed a loyalty platform could solve that.

The platform was originally conceived as a way for musicians to better connect with their fans. While planning the business, Fain and Bowen met Mike Montero. Montero had previously founded and sold two startup companies, Fotolog.net and Community Connect Inc. He joined the company as chief technology officer. CrowdTwist launched in 2010.

=== Techstars ===
In late 2011, CrowdTwist was accepted into the inaugural class of the Techstars NYC program. Techstars is a startup accelerator that awards selected startups up to $18,000 in seed funding, three months of mentorship from successful entrepreneurs and investors, and the opportunity to pitch to angel investors and venture capitalists at the end of the program. CrowdTwist developed and expanded its program offerings through its participation in Techstars. The company was also featured on Bloomberg Television's TechStars reality show in 2011.

== Platform ==
CrowdTwist was a white label omni-channel customer loyalty and data analytics platform. The platform provided brands with visibility into their customers' activities across digital, social, mobile and transactional channels. When customers joined a loyalty program, their interactions with the brand across their social engagement, purchases and email activities were logged in their loyalty profile. Customers then accrued points for actions that benefited a brand, such as when they purchased a product, liked a Facebook profile, or subscribed to email notifications. Those points could be redeemed for rewards designed to increase a customer's brand loyalty. Examples of rewards include VIP concert tickets, brand merchandise and store coupons.

With CrowdTwist, companies could analyze captured data to help clients understand their customers and personalize marketing efforts. The platform tracked customer attributes such as age, gender, location, social influence, recent online activity and online purchasing history. The information collected by CrowdTwist could help companies build consumer profiles and tailor their marketing and customer engagement programs.

== Funding ==
CrowdTwist raised $6 million in Series A funding in September 2011 led by SoftBank Capital and Fairhaven Capital with participation from KBS+P Ventures, Bertelsmann Digital Media Investments and several individual investors. In June 2014 CrowdTwist raised $9 million in Series B funding led by StarVest Partners. All existing investors, including SoftBank Capital and Fairhaven Capital contributed to the Series B funding round. The company has raised a total of $20 million to date.

== Clients & partners ==
CrowdTwist has a variety of clients ranging from Fortune 100 and 500 companies in industries such as retail, consumer packaged goods, financial services, entertainment and travel. Former clients included TOMS, Ubisoft, Bealls, VIZIO, Gatorade, Steve Madden, Blu eCigs, 24 Hour Fitness, Sony Music, Zumiez, Pepsi, The X Factor, Marvel Entertainment, and L'Oréal.

== Acquisition by Oracle ==
On 2 October 2019, Oracle announced that it has signed an agreement to acquire CrowdTwist. The platform became part of Oracle Advertising and Customer Experience.
