= RightNow Technologies =

Software company

RightNow Technologies, Inc.
- Industry: Field service management Customer relationship management
- Founded: Bozeman, Montana (1997)
- Headquarters: Bozeman, Montana
- Products: Customer relationship management software
- Owner: Oracle Corporation
- Website: oracle.com/cx/service

Oracle RightNow is an American customer relationship management (CRM) software service for enterprise organizations which is part of Oracle Service. It was originally developed by RightNow Technologies, Inc., which was acquired by Oracle Corporation in 2011 in a $1.8 billion deal.

The main product offered by RightNow Technologies was RightNow CX, a customer experience suite. RightNow CX was divided into RightNow Web Experience, RightNow Social Experience, RightNow Contact Center Experience, and RightNow Engage. Under Oracle Service, the product has predictive capabilities and offers customer service support for website, apps, chatbot, live chat, video chat, co-browse, social messaging, texting, customer portals, IVR, knowledge base, store associates, and other channels. It is part of the Oracle Advertising and Customer Experience (CX) suite of products, which also includes Advertising, Marketing, and Sales cloud products. Oracle Service Cloud is FedRAMP authorized, which means it meets certain cybersecurity standards and is approved for use by federal agencies.

== History ==
The company was founded in 1997 by Greg Gianforte in Bozeman, Montana as RightNow Technologies. Additional offices were opened in California, New York, New Jersey, Massachusetts, Texas, Illinois, Washington, DC, Colorado, Canada, Europe, Australia and Asia. The company employed over 1000 people in 2011. RightNow's business model was software as a service using cloud computing.

Gianforte started the company in 1997 without external capital and created a software product that was initially focused on customer service with an integrated knowledge base. As the company grew, it added marketing and sales functionality, voice automation, customer feedback management, analytics and a social platform to its product, creating a full customer experience suite.

In 2006, RightNow Technologies acquired SFA company Salesnet.

In 2009, RightNow Technologies acquired social networking company HiveLive.

In 2011, the company acquired Q-go for $34 million. Q-go was founded in 1999. It specialized in semantic search service, based on natural language processing technology, providing relevant answers to queries on a company’s Internet website or corporate intranet, formulated in natural sentences or keyword input alike. It integrated automatic statistical reporting of user query behavior for businesses that want to monitor what kinds of questions their customers are asking so they can adjust content to provide the appropriate information for customers and to reduce the load on traditional customer service ports of call, such as call centers and answers by email. The technology has been implemented and deployed in a range of industries, including banking, insurance, pension, telecommunications and logistics, as well as several government agencies.

== Oracle acquisition ==
In October 2011, Oracle Corporation announced its intention to acquire RightNow for $1.5 billion, a deal which was completed in January 2012. With the acquisition, the name changed to Oracle Service.

In 2014, Oracle acquired LiveLOOK, real-time visual collaboration technology used for cobrowsing, screen sharing, and click-to-call; and TOA (Time of Arrival), a cloud-based field service app which became Oracle Field Service. The capabilities were integrated into the Service software in 2015, along with skills-based routing.

In May 2022, the company integrated its Unity Customer Data Platform (CDP) with Oracle Service to better support customer service agents.

== See also ==
- Oracle Advertising and Customer Experience (CX)
- List of acquisitions by Oracle
