= Pikimal =

- Company type: LLC
- Industry: Search
- Founded: 2010
- Founder: Eric Silver
- Defunct: 2012
- Headquarters: Pittsburgh, Pennsylvania, United States
- Key people: Eric Silver, CEO
- Number of employees: 13
- Website: www.pikimal.com

Pikimal (pronounced as pick-em-all) was a website, designed as a decision engine that uses consumer input to provide specialized search results for products and categories. It was founded by Eric Silver in 2010.

Unlike typical search engines, Pikimal mines data to provide users with only the facts pertaining to their search, as a hopeful solution to SEO and marketing biased search results.

As of April 2011, Pikimal had 13 full-time employees in Pittsburgh, PA, interns, and various contractors around the world.

== History ==
Pikimal was founded in January 2010 by Eric Silver, previously the chief marketing officer at Modcloth. The Pikimal site was launched in public beta form in October 2010.

== Functionality ==
Pikimal allows users to adjust sliders to express what facts of a product are particularly important to them. These percentages are combined with an algorithm to provide users with product recommendations that are rooted directly in facts, but only the facts they find most relevant.

== Pivot and Shutdown ==
In 2012, Pikimal changed its name to Webkite and pivoted to provide faceted search solutions to other companies. As of September 2014, pikimal.com and all associated sites has been shut down.
