= Talari Networks =

- Company type: Private
- Industry: Technology
- Founded: 2007; 19 years ago
- Headquarters: San Jose, California, U.S
- Key people: Patrick Sweeney (chairman & CEO); John Dickey (president & COO, Co-founder); Bob Mosteller (CFO)
- Products: Software-Defined WAN (SD-WAN)
- Website: www.talari.com

Talari Networks is a manufacturer of networking equipment that allows businesses to combine private wide area networks (WANs) with less expensive broadband connections such as DSL or cable. It was founded in 2007 and launched its initial beta product in early 2008. Its headquarters are located in San Jose, California. The company was acquired by Oracle Corporation in 2018.

== History ==
Talari Networks was founded in 2007 by Andy Gottlieb and John Dickey, former colleagues at Applied Micro. Gottlieb became the company’s first CEO, and Dickey became Vice President of Engineering. The company launched its initial beta product in early 2008. Mark Masur was then named CEO of Talari. In 2017 Dell veteran, Patrick Sweeney, was named CEO.

On November 15, 2018, Oracle Corporation announced that it had agreed to acquire Talari Networks. The transaction closed in November 2018.
