= Wercker =

Continuous delivery platform

- Industry: Software development
- Founded: 2011
- Founder: Micha Hernandez van Leuffen
- Defunct: October 31, 2022
- Fate: Acquired by Oracle
- Headquarters: Jan Evertsenstraat 761, 1061 XZ, Amsterdam, Netherlands
- Number of locations: 2 (2016)
- Area served: Global
- Key people: Micha Hernandez van Leuffen (CEO); Andy Smith (CTO); Wayne Gibbins (CCO)
- Services: Enterprise software; Cloud computing; SaaS
- Owner: Oracle Corporation
- Number of employees: 17 (2016)
- Website: wercker.com (defunct)

Wercker was a Docker-based continuous delivery platform that helped software developers build and deploy their applications and microservices. Using its command-line interface, developers could create Docker containers on their desktop, automate their build and deploy processes, testing them on their desktop, and then deploy them to various cloud platforms, ranging from Heroku to AWS and Rackspace. The command-line interface to Wercker has been open-sourced.

The business behind Wercker, also called Wercker, was founded in 2012, and acquired by Oracle Corporation in 2017. After acquisition, Oracle ceased active development of the platform in 2019, with the last release of the command-line interface occurring on April 5, 2019, and ultimately shut down the service on October 31, 2022.

== Product ==
Wercker targeted companies where developers focus on web applications. It acted as the middleman between source-code hosting repositories like GitHub and cloud servers like Amazon Web Services. Each time a developer made a change to his or her codebase in Git, Wercker retrieved the code, built a version of it inside a container to isolate it, tested it for errors and then notified the user if it either passed or failed.

Wercker was integrated with Docker containers, which package up application code and can be easily moved from server to server. Each build artifact could be a Docker container. The user could take the container from the Docker Hub or their private registry and build the code before shipping it. Its SaaS platform enabled developers to test and deploy code often. They could push software updates incrementally as they were ready, rather than in bundled dumps. It made it easier for coders to practice continuous integration, a software engineering practice in which each change a developer makes to the codebase is constantly tested in the process so that software doesn't break when it goes live.

Wercker was based on the concept of pipelines, which are automated workflows. Pipelines took pieces of code and automatically executed a series of steps upon that code. The Wercker API provided programmatic access to information about applications, builds and deploys. There were code snippets available for Golang, Node.js and Python. The service included a social networking element, providing a Facebook-like wall so team members knew what their colleagues were doing. This created a high degree of transparency, which was needed by the ever more numerous groups that worked across different countries on the same projects.

Wercker was available as cloud services, and was working on an enterprise offering that would allow on-premises use as well before the acquisition.

== History ==
Hernandez van Leuffen came up with Wercker's underlying technology for his thesis project on containers and automatic resource provisioning at the University of San Francisco. NexusLabs, a foundation based in Amsterdam and at MIT, helped Wercker attract venture capital from the United States. In January 2013, Wercker received a seed investment from an A-list group of investors. The round was led by Shamrock Ventures with additional support from Greylock Venture Partners, and Amsterdam-based micro VC Vitulum Ventures. Company executives did not reveal the amount of funding they received, but Wercker allegedly raised close to $1 million.

Wercker was part of the 2012 startup incubator program Rockstart Accelerator in Amsterdam. It participated in the Mozilla WebFWD program and won the Salesforce Innovation Challenge. It also won the Gigaom Structure: Europe Launchpad competition, receiving both the People's Choice and Judge's awards.

The startup brought on former co-founder of OpenStack Andy Smith as CTO in September 2014. A month later, Wercker brought in $2.4 million, bringing total funding to $3.2 million. Notion Capital drove the investment round along with Tola Capital, Vitulum Ventures, Shamrock Ventures, and Rockstart Accelerator. While Wercker originally focused on LXC containers, it converted its platform to run on Docker containers in late 2014. It launched a local development model, enabling developers to build and deploy containerized applications.

Entrepreneur included Wercker among "9 essential tools for agile product development teams" in July 2015. In December, Atlassian launched a Wercker integration of its Git-based Bitbucket service, called the Wercker YAML Viewer.

In January 2016, Wercker announced a $4.5 million Series A investment round, led by Inkef Capital with participation from Notion Capital, bringing the company's total funding to $7.5 million. It was the first time that Inkef Capital, one of the largest VC funds in the Netherlands, invested in a developer tool. Wercker announced it would use the investment to drive developer adoption, expand into the enterprise market, and deepen automation capabilities with more flexible and complex development pipelines.

On April 17, 2017, Oracle announced that it had signed a definitive agreement to acquire Wercker. After the acquisition, development on the platform slowed and officially ceased in April 2019, as evidenced by the final release of the command-line interface on April 5, 2019.

== Shutdown ==
On April 7, 2022, Oracle announced that the Wercker service would be shut down on October 31, 2022. In their shutdown notice, Oracle recommended that users migrate to Oracle Cloud Infrastructure (OCI) DevOps service as an alternative. However, unlike Wercker, OCI DevOps did not offer a free tier option for build resources, requiring users to upgrade to a paid Oracle Cloud account, either through a "Pay As You Go" model or by contacting Oracle's sales team.
