= Q-go =

Privately owned international company

- Company type: Search Engine
- Industry: Search engine technology, Enterprise search
- Founded: 1999
- Founder: Stan van de Burgt; Berend Metz
- Headquarters: Amsterdam, Netherlands
- Area served: Europe, North America, South America
- Key people: Marcel Smit; (CEO); Marcel Karssen; (CFO/CTO); René Stukker; (CCO); Gertjan Krab; (Director Professional Services)
- Products: Semantic search, Dynamic FAQs and web banners, User search query trend reporting
- Website: www.q-go.com

Q-go was a privately owned international company that specializes in semantic search SaaS, based on Natural Language Processing technology. The technology provides relevant answers to users in response to queries on a company's internet website or corporate intranet, formulated in natural sentences or keyword input alike. It integrates automatic statistical reporting of user query behavior for businesses that want to monitor what kinds of questions their customers are asking. This is in order to adjust content to provide the appropriate information for customers and to reduce the load on traditional customer service ports of call, such as call centers and answers by email. RightNow Technologies acquired Q-go for $34 million on January 18, 2011. Rightnow was subsequently acquired by Oracle Corporation.

== Brief history ==
Q-go was founded in 1999. Its head office was based in Amsterdam, with further offices in Barcelona, Madrid, Bonn, Zurich, and New York City. It also had a partnership presence in other countries.

== Scope ==
The company's intuitive website search and question answering management system is currently available in a variety of languages, including English, Dutch, German, French, Italian, Spanish, and Catalan. Q-go has been implemented and deployed in a range of industries, including banking, insurance, pension, telecommunications and logistics, as well as several government agencies.
