= BigMachines =

Configure, price, quote cloud software owned by Oracle

- Type: Subsidiary
- Industry: Configure, price and quote
- Founded: 2000; 26 years ago
- Headquarters: Austin, Texas, U.S.
- Parent: Oracle Corporation
- Website: www.oracle.com/cx/sales/cpq/

BigMachines, now Oracle Configure, Price, Quote (CPQ), was a software company founded in 2000 by Godard Abel and Christopher Shutts, which was acquired by Oracle in 2013. The software is designed to integrate with enterprise resource planning (ERP), customer relationship management (CRM), and other business systems to help companies automate the sales process. It specializes in software for configure, price and quote (CPQ). It can be used by internal teams, channel partners, VARs, distributors, customers, and outside representatives and partners.

The company was headquartered in Deerfield, Illinois, US with development offices in San Mateo, California, US and Hyderabad, India.

== Oracle acquisition ==
Vista Equity Partners, a private equity firm based in San Francisco, acquired majority ownership of BigMachines in 2010 through several transactions starting January 2001. Shortly after in 2011, Abel left the company.

Three years later, Oracle Corporation announced it was acquiring BigMachines on October 24, 2013. Oracle kept the product, now called CPQ Cloud.

== Oracle CPQ as part of Oracle Sales ==
Oracle CPQ is part of Oracle Sales, a SaaS CRM product that is part of Oracle Advertising and Customer Experience. Oracle Sales capabilities include:

- Sales force automation
- Sales planning and forecasting
- Customer data intelligence
- Sales performance management
- Subscription management
- Partner relationship management
- Configure, price, quote

In 2017, Order Management, part of the Oracle Cloud SCM, was integrated with the CPQ Cloud, giving companies the ability to use the SCM Configurator within CPQ.

== Awards ==
- 2003 Start Magazine – Technology & Business Award
- 2004, 2006, 2007 Supply & Demand Chain – Supply & Demand Chain Executive Top 100
- 2008, 2009, 2010, 2011, 2012 Inc 5000 five-year consecutive Award Winner
- 2010 Sales 2.0 Awards – Best Sales Enablement Program
- 2010 Codie award Winner – Best Business Productivity Solution
