= TOA Technologies =

American field service software company

- Type: Private
- Industry: Enterprise software, Field service management
- Founded: 2003
- Founder: Yuval Brisker and Irad Carmi
- Headquarters: Beachwood, Ohio, United States
- Area served: Worldwide
- Key people: Yuval Brisker (Chairman of the Board, President & CEO), Irad Carmi (President & CTO), Brian Cook (CFO), Bruce Grainger (Senior Vice President Global Sales)
- Products: ETAdirect Enterprise, ETAdirect Professional, ETAworkforce
- Services: Field service management
- Revenue: ▲US$41.0 million (FY 2012)
- Number of employees: 550+
- Parent: Oracle Corporation
- Website: www.toatech.com

TOA Technologies was an American software-as-a-service company that developed, marketed and sold ETAdirect, a web-based applications solution for companies with small, medium, and large mobile workforces across the world.

Headquartered in Beachwood, Ohio, its products included advanced tools for automating and optimizing planning, scheduling, appointment booking, and routing, as well as job allocation and real-time field service event management.

TOA Technologies was acquired by Oracle Corporation in 2014.

== ETAdirect ==
ETAdirect is a software as a service model employing a patented algorithm which operates using pattern recognition in order to accurately gauge the arrival time of a mobile employee at a customer's location. Additionally, ETAdirect's algorithm provides data which enables the estimation of job length. ETAdirect's prediction window is typically less than 60 minutes, allowing for precise notices to consumers over a variety of channels including: voice, email, text, X, and other communications channels. This technology aims at reducing customer queries to service provider call centers.

ETAdirect is currently used by several cable television companies in North America, including Cox Communications, broadband operators in Europe, such as Virgin Media, and ONO (Spain). They also provide their service to global communications companies such as Telefonica and global utility companies like E.ON.

== Company information ==
TOA Technologies was founded by Yuval Brisker and Irad Carmi in 2003. The company is privately held and employs more than 550 employees worldwide and is headquartered in Beachwood, Ohio, with additional offices in London, United Kingdom, and São Paulo, Brazil.

Principal venture shareholders are Technology Crossover Ventures, Draper Triangle Ventures (a DFJ network affiliate), Intel Capital, and Sutter Hill Ventures.

TOA stands for "Time of Arrival." The concept of time is central to the ETAdirect software solution set, as its central algorithm measures time and predicts performance based on resource-specific pattern recognition and predictive analytics. This yields a more accurate time of arrival estimates than the alternative of managing service appointments according to averages of human resource capabilities and availability.

As of December 2013, TOA Technologies had over 85,000 users.

Oracle Corporation announced that it was acquiring TOA Technologies on July 31, 2014.

== Milestones ==
In July 2013, TOA Technologies closed a major round of funding with Technology Crossover Ventures, raising $66 million to transform global field service management.

On July 31, 2014, Oracle Corporation announced that it was buying TOA Technologies. The transaction closed in mid-September, 2014.

== See also ==
- Software as a service
- Decision support system
- Service chain optimization
- Field service management
- Enterprise mobility management
- Customer relationship management
- Customer experience management
- Workforce management
- Vehicle routing problem
