= Customer lifetime value =

Marketing concept

In marketing, customer lifetime value (CLV or often CLTV), lifetime customer value (LCV), or life-time value (LTV) is an estimation and prediction of the net profit that a customer contributes to during the entire future relationship with a business. The prediction model can have varying levels of sophistication and accuracy, ranging from a crude heuristic to the use of complex predictive analytics techniques.

Customer lifetime value can also be defined as the monetary value of a customer relationship, based on the present value of the projected future cash flows from the customer relationship. Customer lifetime value is an important metric in that it encourages firms to shift their focus from quarterly profits to the long-term health of their customer relationships, and additionally represents an upper limit on spending to acquire new customers. For this reason it is an important element in calculating payback of advertising spent in marketing mix modeling. Customer lifetime value is often used to guide customer acquisition, retention, and loyalty strategies.

One of the first accounts of the term "customer lifetime value" is in the 1988 book Database Marketing, which includes detailed worked examples. Early adopters of customer lifetime value models in the 1990s include Edge Consulting and BrandScience.

== Purpose ==
The purpose of the customer lifetime value metric is to assess the financial value of each customer. Don Peppers and Martha Rogers are quoted as saying, "some customers are more equal than others." Customer lifetime value differs from customer profitability or CP (the difference between the revenues and the costs associated with the customer relationship during a specified period) in that CP measures the past and CLV looks forward. As such, CLV can be more useful in shaping managers’ decisions but is much more difficult to quantify. While quantifying CP is a matter of carefully reporting and summarizing the results of past activity, quantifying CLV involves forecasting future activity.

Customer lifetime value:
The present value of the future cash flows attributed to the customer during his/her entire relationship with the company.

Present value is the discounted sum of future cash flows: each future cash flow is multiplied by a carefully selected number less than one, before being added together. The multiplication factor accounts for the way the value of money is discounted over time. The time-based value of money captures the intuition that everyone would prefer to get paid sooner rather than later but would prefer to pay later rather than sooner. The multiplication factors depend on the discount rate chosen (10% per year as an example) and the length of time before each cash flow occurs. For example, money received ten years from now must be discounted more than money received five years in the future.

CLV applies the concept of present value to cash flows attributed to the customer relationship. Because the present value of any stream of future cash flows is designed to measure the single lump sum value today of the future stream of cash flows, CLV will represent the single lump sum value today of the customer relationship. Even more simply, CLV is the monetary value of the customer relationship to the firm. It is an upper limit on what the firm would be willing to pay to acquire the customer relationship as well as an upper limit on the amount the firm would be willing to pay to avoid losing the customer relationship. If a customer relationship is viewed as an asset of the firm, CLV would present the monetary value of that asset.

One of the major uses of CLV is customer segmentation, based on the understanding that not all customers are equally valuable. A CLV-based segmentation model allows the company to predict the most profitable group of customers, understand those customers' common characteristics, and focus more on them rather than on less profitable customers. CLV-based segmentation can be combined with a share of wallet (SOW) model to identify "high CLV but low SOW" customers, with the assumption that the company's profit could be maximized by investing marketing resources in those customers.

Customer lifetime value metrics are used mainly in relationship-focused businesses, especially those with customer contracts. Examples include banking and insurance services, telecommunications and most of the business-to-business sector. However, the CLV principles may be extended to transactions-focused categories such as consumer packaged goods by incorporating stochastic purchase models of individual or aggregate behavior. In either case, retention has a decisive impact on CLV, since low retention rates result in customer lifetime value barely increasing over time.

== Construction ==
When margins and retention rates are constant, the following formula can be used to calculate the lifetime value of a customer relationship:

$\text{Customer Lifetime Value} = \text{Margin} \cdot \frac{\text{Retention Rate}}{1+\text{Discount Rate}-\text{Retention Rate}}$

The model for customer cash flows treats the firm's customer relationships as something of a leaky bucket. Each period, a fraction (1 less the retention rate) of the firm's customers leave and are lost for good.

The CLV model has only three parameters: (1) constant margin (contribution after deducting variable costs including retention spending) per period, (2) constant retention probability per period, and (3) discount rate. Furthermore, the model assumes that in the event that the customer is not retained, they are lost for good. Finally, the model assumes that the first margin will be received (with probability equal to the retention rate) at the end of the first period.

The one other assumption of the model is that the firm uses an infinite horizon when it calculates the present value of future cash flows. Although no firm actually has an infinite horizon, the consequences of assuming one are discussed in the following.

Under the assumptions of the model, CLV is a multiple of the margin. The multiplicative factor represents the present value of the expected length (number of periods) of the customer relationship. When retention equals 0, the customer will never be retained, and the multiplicative factor is zero. When retention equals 1, the customer is always retained, and the firm receives the margin in perpetuity. The present value of the margin in perpetuity turns out to be the Margin divided by the Discount Rate. For retention values in between, the CLV formula tells us the appropriate multiplier.

== Methodology ==
Simple commerce example

(Avg Monthly Revenue per Customer * Gross Margin per Customer) ÷ Monthly Churn Rate

The numerator represents the average monthly profit per customer, and dividing by the churn rate sums the geometric series representing the chance the customer will still be around in future months.

For example: $100 avg monthly spend * 25% margin ÷ 5% monthly churn = $500 LTV

A retention example

CLV (customer lifetime value) calculation process consists of four steps:

1. forecasting of remaining customer lifetime (most often in years)
2. forecasting of future revenues (most often year-by-year), based on estimation about future products purchased and price paid
3. estimation of costs for delivering those products
4. calculation of the net present value of these future amounts

Forecasting accuracy and the difficulty of tracking customers over time may affect the CLV calculation process.

Retention models make several simplifying assumptions and often involve the following inputs:

- Churn rate, the percentage of customers who end their relationship with a company in a given period. Churn rate + retention rate = 100%. Most models can be written using either churn rate or retention rate. If the model uses only one churn rate, the assumption is that the churn rate is constant across the life of the customer relationship.
- Discount rate, the cost of capital used to discount future revenue from a customer. Discounting is an advanced topic that is frequently ignored in customer lifetime value calculations. The current interest rate is sometimes used as a simple (but incorrect) proxy for discount rate.
- Contribution margin
- Retention cost, the amount of money a company has to spend in a given period to retain an existing customer. Retention costs include customer support, billing, promotional incentives, etc.
- Period, the unit of time into which a customer relationship is divided for analysis. A year is the most commonly used period. Customer lifetime value is a multi-period calculation, usually stretching 3–7 years into the future. In practice, analysis beyond this point is viewed as too speculative to be reliable. The number of periods used in the calculation is sometimes referred to as the model horizon.

Thus, one of the ways to calculate CLV, where period is a year, is as follows:

$$\text{CLV}  = \text{GC} \cdot \sum_{i=1}^n \frac{r^i}{(1+d)^i} - \text{M} \cdot \sum_{i=1}^n \frac{r^{i-1}}{(1+d)^{i-0.5}}$$

where $\text{GC}$ is yearly gross contribution per customer, $\text{M}$ is the (relevant) retention costs per customer per year (this formula assumes the retention activities are paid for each mid year and they only affect those who were retained in the previous year), $n$ is the horizon (in years), $r$ is the yearly retention rate, $d$ is the yearly discount rate. In addition to retention costs, firms are likely to invest in cross-selling activities which are designed to increase the yearly profit of a customer over time.

Simplified models

It is often helpful to estimate customer lifetime value with a simple model to make initial assessments of customer segments and targeting. If $\text{GC}$ is found to be relatively fixed across periods, CLV can be expressed as a simpler model assuming an infinite economic life (i.e., $\text{N} \rightarrow \infty$):

$$\text{CLV} = \text{GC} \cdot \left(\frac{r}{1+d-r}\right)$$

Note: No CLV methodology has been independently audited by the Marketing Accountability Standards Board (MASB) according to MMAP (Marketing Metric Audit Protocol).

== Uses and advantages ==
Customer lifetime value has intuitive appeal as a marketing concept, because in theory it represents exactly how much each customer is worth in monetary terms, and therefore exactly how much a marketing department should be willing to spend to acquire each customer, especially in direct response marketing.

Lifetime value is typically used to judge the appropriateness of the costs of acquisition of a customer. For example, if a new customer costs $50 to acquire (COCA, or cost of customer acquisition), and their lifetime value is $60, then the customer is judged to be profitable, and acquisition of additional similar customers is acceptable.

Additionally, CLV is used to calculate customer equity.

Advantages of CLV:

- management of customer relationship as an asset
- monitoring the impact of management strategies and marketing investments on the value of customer assets, e.g.: marketing mix modeling simulators can use a multi-year CLV model to show the true value (versus acquisition cost) of an additional customer, reduced churn rate, product up-sell
- determination of the optimal level of investments in marketing and sales activities
- encourages marketers to focus on the long-term value of customers instead of investing resources in acquiring "cheap" customers with low total revenue value
- implementation of sensitivity analysis in order to determinate getting impact by spending extra money on each customer
- optimal allocation of limited resources for ongoing marketing activities in order to achieve a maximum return
- a good basis for selecting customers and for decision making regarding customer specific communication strategies
- measurement of customer loyalty (proportion of purchase, probability of purchase and repurchase, purchase frequency and sequence etc.)

The disadvantages of CLV generally do not stem from CLV modeling per se, but from its incorrect application.

== Misuses and downsides ==
=== NPV vs. nominal prediction ===
The most accurate CLV predictions are made using the net present value (NPV) of each future net profit source, so that the revenue to be received from the customer in the future is recognized at the future value of money. However, NPV calculations require additional sophistication including maintenance of a discount rate, which leads most organizations to instead calculate CLV using the nominal (non-discounted) figures. Nominal CLV predictions are biased slightly high, scaling higher the farther into the future the revenues are expected from customers.

=== Net profit vs. revenue ===
A common mistake is for a CLV prediction to calculate the total revenue or even gross margin associated with a customer. However, this can cause CLV to be multiples of their actual value, and instead need to be calculated as the full net profit expected from the customer.

Often ecommerce reporting systems will report lifetime revenue (LTR), rather than lifetime value based on net profit, due to the difficulty most ecommerce platforms have generating an accurate profit figure (i.e. calculating accurate sold item costs, marketing costs and delivery costs) on an order by order basis. Lifetime revenue can still be as a useful metric for ecommerce stores to report on in order to measure site performance.

=== Segment inaccuracy ===
Opponents often cite the inaccuracy of a CLV prediction to argue they should not be used to drive significant business decisions. For example, major drivers to the value of a customer such as the nature of the relationship are often not available as appropriately structured data and thus not included in the formula.

=== Comparison with intuition ===
More predictors, such as specific demographics of a customer group, may have an effect that is intuitively obvious to an experienced marketer but are often omitted from CLV predictions and thus cause inaccuracies in certain customer segments.

=== Over-values current customers at the expense of potential customers ===
The biggest problem with how many CLV models are actually used is that they tend to deny the very idea that marketing works (i.e., that marketing will change customer behavior). Low-value customers can be turned into high-value customers by effective marketing. Many CLV models use incorrect mathematics in that they do not take account of the value of a far greater number of middle-value customers, over-prioritizing a smaller number of high value customers. Additionally, these high-value customers may be saturated (i.e., not have the ability to buy any more products), may be the most expensive group to serve, and may be the most expensive group to reach by communication. The use of survey data is a viable way to collect information on potential customers.

=== CLV is a dynamic concept, not a static model ===
A customer lifetime value is the output of a model, not an input. If the model inputs change (e.g., marketing is effective and retention rates increase), the average CLV will increase. However, when engaging with customers in such way which cause detraction, the opposite may happen and average CLV will go down (e.g. the invoicing department sends them the wrong or unclear invoices).

== See also ==
- Customer acquisition cost
- Buy Till you Die, a class of statistical methods to estimate customer lifetime value
- Customer profitability, the profit the firm makes from serving a customer or customer group over a specified period of time
- Customer value maximization, how to increase customer value
- Gompertz distribution, commonly applied to describe the distribution of adult lifespans by demographers and actuaries
