= Customer relationship management =

Process of managing interactions with customers

Customer relationship management (CRM) is a strategic process that organizations use to manage, analyze, and improve their interactions with customers. By using data-driven insights, CRM often involves dedicated information systems that help store and analyze customer data, support communication, and coordinate sales, marketing, and service activities.

CRM systems compile data from a range of different communication channels, including a company's website, telephone (which many services come with a softphone), email, live chat, marketing materials, and more recently, social media. They allow businesses to learn more about their target audiences and how to better cater to their needs, thus retaining customers and driving sales growth. CRM may be used with past, present or potential customers. The concepts, procedures, and rules that a corporation follows when communicating with its consumers are referred to as CRM. This complete connection covers direct contact with customers, such as sales and service-related operations, forecasting, and the analysis of consumer patterns and behaviours, from the perspective of the company.

The global customer relationship management market size is projected to grow from $101.41 billion in 2024 to $262.74 billion by 2032, at a CAGR of 12.6%.

== History ==
The concept of customer relationship management started in the early 1970s, when customer satisfaction was evaluated using annual surveys or by front-line asking. At that time, businesses had to rely on standalone mainframe systems to automate sales, but the extent of technology allowed them to categorize customers in spreadsheets and lists. One of the best-known precursors of modern-day CRM is the Farley File. Developed by Franklin Roosevelt's campaign manager, James Farley, the Farley File was a comprehensive set of records detailing political and personal facts about people FDR and Farley met or were supposed to meet. Using it, people that FDR met were impressed by his "recall" of facts about their family and what they were doing professionally and politically. In 1982, Kate and Robert D. Kestenbaum introduced the concept of database marketing, namely applying statistical methods to analyze and gather customer data. By 1987, Pat Sullivan and Mike Muhney had released a customer evaluation system called ACT! based on the principle of a digital Rolodex, which offered a contact management service for the first time.

The trend was followed by numerous companies and independent developers trying to maximize lead potential, including Tom Siebel of Siebel Systems, who designed the first CRM product, Siebel Customer Relationship Management, in 1993. In order to compete with these new and quickly growing stand-alone CRM solutions, established enterprise resource planning (ERP) software companies like Oracle, Zoho Corporation, SAP, Peoplesoft (an Oracle subsidiary as of 2005) and Navision started extending their sales, distribution and customer service capabilities with embedded CRM modules. This included embedding sales force automation or extended customer service (e.g. inquiry, activity management) as CRM features in their ERP.

Customer relationship management was popularized in 1997 due to the work of Siebel, Gartner, and IBM. Between 1997 and 2000, leading CRM products were enriched with shipping and marketing capabilities. Siebel introduced the first mobile CRM app called Siebel Sales Handheld in 1999. The idea of a stand-alone, cloud-hosted customer base was soon adopted by other leading providers at the time, including PeopleSoft (acquired by Oracle), Oracle, SAP and Salesforce.com.

The first open-source CRM system was developed by SugarCRM in 2004. During this period, CRM was rapidly migrating to the cloud, as a result of which it became accessible to sole entrepreneurs and small teams. This increase in accessibility generated a huge wave of price reduction. Around 2009, developers began considering the options to profit from social media's momentum and designed tools to help companies become accessible on all users' favourite networks. Many startups at the time benefited from this trend to provide exclusively social CRM solutions, including Base and Nutshell. The same year, Gartner organized and held the first Customer Relationship Management Summit, and summarized the features systems should offer to be classified as CRM solutions. In 2013 and 2014, most of the popular CRM products were linked to business intelligence systems and communication software to improve corporate communication and end-users' experience. The leading trend is to replace standardized CRM solutions with industry-specific ones, or to make them customizable enough to meet the needs of every business. In November 2016, Forrester released a report where it "identified the nine most significant CRM suites from eight prominent vendors".

== Types ==
=== Strategic ===
Strategic CRM concentrates upon the development of a customer-centric business culture.

The focus of a business on being customer-centric (in design and implementation of their CRM strategy) will translate into an improved CLV.

=== Operational ===
The primary goal of CRM systems is integration and automation of sales, marketing, and customer support. Therefore, these systems typically have a dashboard that gives an overall view of the three functions on a single customer view, a single page for each customer that a company may have. The dashboard may provide client information, past sales, previous marketing efforts, and more, summarizing all of the relationships between the customer and the firm. Operational CRM is made up of three main components: sales force automation, marketing automation, and service automation.

- Sales force automation works with all stages in the sales cycle, from initially entering contact information to converting a prospective client into an actual client. It implements sales promotion analysis, automates the tracking of a client's account history for repeated sales or future sales and coordinates sales, marketing, call centers, and retail outlets. It prevents duplicate efforts between a salesperson and a customer and also automatically tracks all contacts and follow-ups between both parties.
- Marketing automation focuses on easing the overall marketing process to make it more effective and efficient. CRM tools with marketing automation capabilities can automate repeated tasks, for example, sending out automated marketing emails at certain times to customers or posting marketing information on social media. The goal with marketing automation is to turn a sales lead into a full customer. CRM systems today also work on customer engagement through social media.
- Service automation is the part of the CRM system that focuses on direct customer service technology. Through service automation, customers are supported through multiple channels such as phone, email, knowledge bases, ticketing portals, FAQs, and more.

=== Analytical ===
The role of analytical CRM systems is to analyze customer data collected through multiple sources and present it so that business managers can make more informed decisions. Analytical CRM systems use techniques such as data mining, correlation, and pattern recognition to analyze customer data. These analytics help improve customer service by finding small problems which can be solved, perhaps by marketing to different parts of a consumer audience differently. For example, through the analysis of a customer base's buying behavior, a company might see that this customer base has not been buying a lot of products recently. After reviewing their data, the company might think to market to this subset of consumers differently to best communicate how this company's products might benefit this group specifically.

=== Collaborative ===
The third primary aim of CRM systems is to incorporate external stakeholders such as suppliers, vendors, and distributors, and to share customer information across groups, departments, and organizations. For example, feedback can be collected from technical support calls, which could help provide direction for marketing products and services to that particular customer in the future.

=== Customer data platform ===
A customer data platform (CDP) is a computer system used by marketing departments that assembles data about individual people from various sources into one database, with which other software systems can interact. As of February 2017, about twenty companies were selling such systems and revenue for them was around US$300 million.

== Components ==
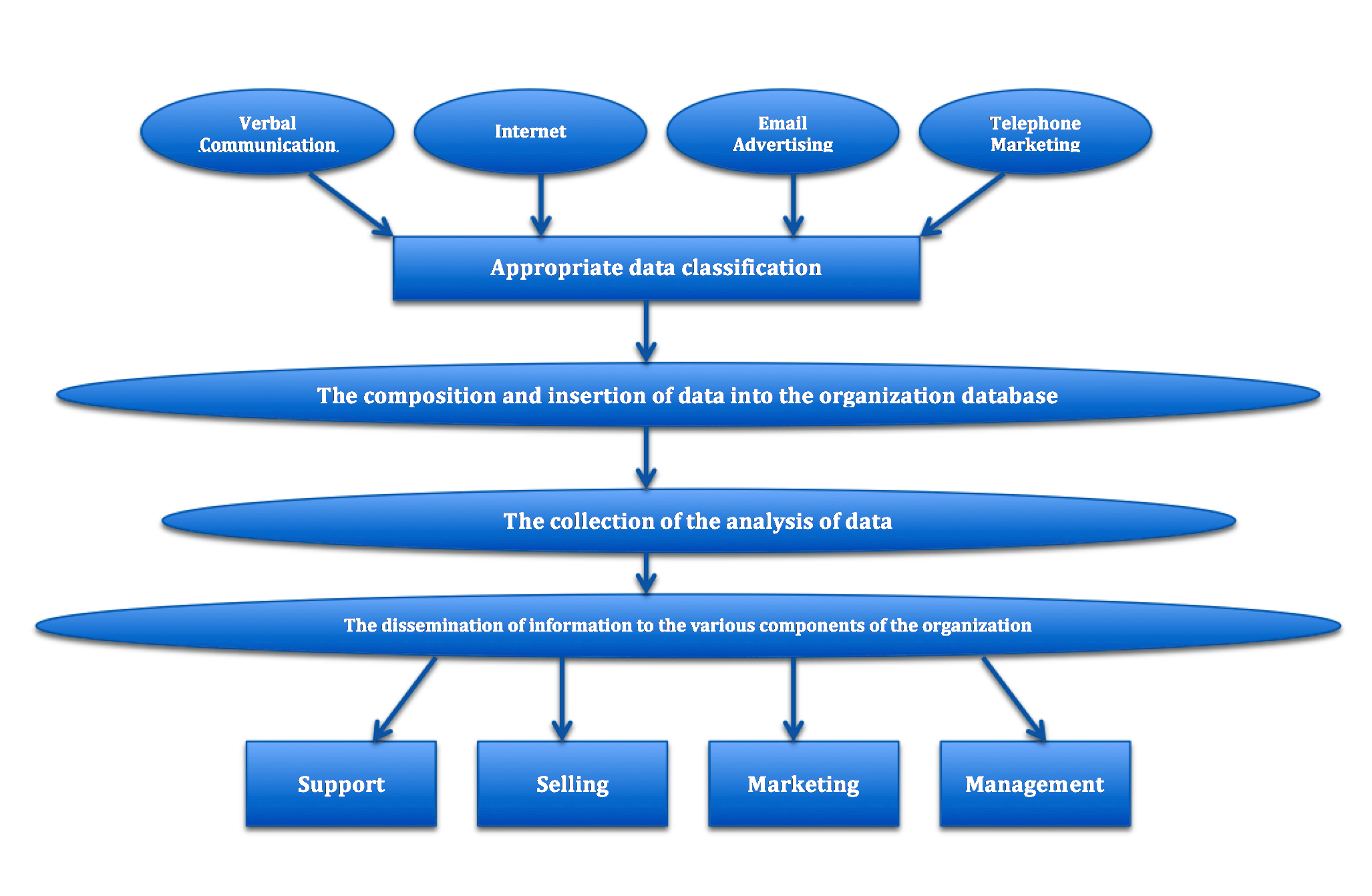
Components in the different types of CRM

The main components of CRM are building and managing customer relationships through marketing, observing relationships as they mature through distinct phases, managing these relationships at each stage and recognizing that the distribution of the value of a relationship to the firm is not homogeneous. When building and managing customer relationships through marketing, firms might benefit from using a variety of tools to help organizational design, incentive schemes, customer structures, and more to optimize the reach of their marketing campaigns. Through the acknowledgment of the distinct phases of CRM, businesses will be able to benefit from seeing the interaction of multiple relationships as connected transactions. The final factor of CRM highlights the importance of CRM through accounting for the profitability of customer relationships. By studying the particular spending habits of customers, a firm may be able to dedicate different resources and amounts of attention to different types of consumers. CRM systems may also incorporate automation features to streamline repetitive tasks such as data entry, follow-ups, and customer segmentation.

Relational Intelligence, which is the awareness of the variety of relationships a customer can have with a firm and the ability of the firm to reinforce or change those connections, is an important component of the main phases of CRM. Companies may be good at capturing demographic data, such as gender, age, income, and education, and connecting them with purchasing information to categorize customers into profitability tiers, but this is only a firm's industrial view of customer relationships. A lack of relational intelligence is a sign that firms still see customers as resources that can be used for up-sell or cross-sell opportunities, rather than people looking for interesting and personalized interactions.

CRM systems include:

- Data warehouse technology, which is used to aggregate transaction information, to merge the information with CRM products, and to provide key performance indicators.
- Opportunity management, which helps the company to manage unpredictable growth and demand and implement a good forecasting model to integrate sales history with sales projections.
- CRM systems that track and measure marketing campaigns over multiple networks, tracking customer analysis by customer clicks and sales.
- Some CRM software is available as a software as a service (SaaS), delivered via the internet and accessed via a web browser instead of being installed on a local computer. Businesses using the software do not purchase it but typically pay a recurring subscription fee to the software vendor,or use free versions of software suites, like those offered by HubSpot and Salesforce.
- For small businesses, a CRM system may consist of a contact management system that integrates emails, documents, jobs, faxes, and scheduling for individual accounts. CRM systems available for specific markets (legal, finance) frequently focus on event management and relationship tracking as opposed to financial return on investment (ROI). Notable small business CRMs, which are typically subscription-based, include those developed and sold by Salesforce, Freshworks, Pipedrive, and Close.
- CRM systems for eCommerce focus on marketing automation tasks such as cart rescue, re-engaging users with email, and personalization.
- Customer-centric relationship management (CCRM) is a nascent sub-discipline that focuses on customer preferences instead of customer leverage. CCRM aims to add value by engaging customers in individual, interactive relationships.
- Systems for non-profit and membership-based organizations help track constituents, fundraising, sponsors' demographics, membership levels, membership directories, volunteering and communication with individuals.
- CRM not only indicates technology and strategy but also indicates an integrated approach that includes employees knowledge and organizational culture to embrace the CRM philosophy.

== Effect on customer satisfaction ==
Customer satisfaction has important implications for the economic performance of firms because it has the ability to increase customer loyalty and usage behavior and reduce customer complaints and the likelihood of customer defection. The implementation of a CRM approach is likely to affect customer satisfaction and customer knowledge for a variety of different reasons.

Firstly, firms can customize their offerings for each customer. By accumulating information across customer interactions and processing this information to discover hidden patterns, CRM applications help firms customize their offerings to suit the individual tastes of their customers. This customization enhances the perceived quality of products and services from a customer's viewpoint, and because the perceived quality is a determinant of customer satisfaction, it follows that CRM applications indirectly affect customer satisfaction. CRM applications also enable firms to provide timely, accurate processing of customer orders and requests and the ongoing management of customer accounts. For example, Piccoli and Applegate discuss how Wyndham uses IT tools to deliver a consistent service experience across its various properties to a customer. Both an improved ability to customize and reduced variability of the consumption experience enhance perceived quality, which in turn positively affects customer satisfaction. CRM applications also help firms manage customer relationships more effectively across the stages of relationship initiation, maintenance, and termination.

=== Customer benefits ===
With CRM systems, customers are served on the day-to-day process. With more reliable information, their demand for self-service from companies will decrease. If there is less need to interact with the company for different problems, then the customer satisfaction level is expected to increase. These central benefits of CRM will be connected hypothetically to the three kinds of equity, which are relationship, value, and brand, and in the end to customer equity. Eight benefits were recognized to provide value drivers.

1. Enhanced ability to target profitable customers.
2. Integrated assistance across channels.
3. Enhanced sales force efficiency and effectiveness.
4. Improved pricing.
5. Customized products and services.
6. Improved customer service efficiency and effectiveness.
7. Individualized marketing messages are also called campaigns.
8. Connect customers and all channels on a single platform.

=== Examples ===
Research has found a 5% increase in customer retention boosts lifetime customer profits by 50% on average across multiple industries, as well as a boost of up to 90% within specific industries such as insurance. Companies that have mastered customer relationship strategies have the most successful CRM programs. For example, MBNA Europe has had a 75% annual profit growth since 1995. The firm heavily invests in screening potential cardholders. Once proper clients are identified, the firm retains 97% of its profitable customers. They implement CRM by marketing the right products to the right customers. The firm's customers' card usage is 52% above the industry norm, and the average expenditure is 30% more per transaction. Also 10% of their account holders ask for more information on cross-sale products.

Amazon has also seen successes through its customer proposition. The firm implemented personal greetings, collaborative filtering, and more for the customer. They also used CRM training for the employees to see up to 80% of customers repeat.

== Customer profile ==
A customer profile is a detailed description of any particular classification of customer which is created to represent the typical users of a product or service. Customer profiling is a method to understand your customers in terms of demographics, behaviour and lifestyle. It is used to help make customer-focused decisions without confusing the scope of the project with personal opinion. Overall profiling is gathering information that sums up consumption habits so far and projects them into the future so that they can be grouped for marketing and advertising purposes. Customer or consumer profiles are the essences of the data that is collected alongside core data (name, address, company) and processed through customer analytics methods, essentially a type of profiling. The three basic methods of customer profiling are the psychographic approach, the consumer typology approach, and the consumer characteristics approach. These customer profiling methods help you design your business around who your customers are and help you make better customer-centered decisions.

== Improving CRM ==
Consultants hold that it is important for companies to establish strong CRM systems to improve their relational intelligence. According to this argument, a company must recognize that people have many different types of relationships with different brands. One research study analyzed relationships between consumers in China, Germany, Spain, and the United States, with over 200 brands in 11 industries including airlines, cars, and media. This information is valuable as it provides demographic, behavioral, and value-based customer segmentation. These types of relationships can be both positive and negative. Some customers view themselves as friends of the brands, while others as enemies, and some are mixed with a love-hate relationship with the brand. Some relationships are distant, intimate, or anything in between.

=== Data analysis ===
Managers must understand the different reasons for the types of relationships, and provide the customer with what they are looking for. Companies can collect this information by using surveys, interviews, and more, with current customers. Companies must also improve the relational intelligence of their CRM systems. Companies store and receive huge amounts of data through emails, online chat sessions, phone calls, and more. Many companies do not properly make use of this great amount of data, however. All of these are signs of what types of relationships the customer wants with the firm, and therefore companies may consider investing more time and effort in building out their relational intelligence. Companies can use data mining technologies and web searches to understand relational signals. Social media such as social networking sites, blogs, and forums can also be used to collect and analyze information. Understanding the customer and capturing this data allows companies to convert customers' signals into information and knowledge that the firm can use to understand a potential customer's desired relations with a brand.

=== Employee training ===
Many firms have also implemented training programs to teach employees how to recognize and create strong customer-brand relationships. Other employees have also been trained in social psychology and the social sciences to help bolster customer relationships. Customer service representatives must be trained to value customer relationships and trained to understand existing customer profiles. Even the finance and legal departments should understand how to manage and build relationships with customers.

== In practice ==
=== Call centers ===
Contact centre CRM providers are popular for small and mid-market businesses. These systems codify the interactions between the company and customers by using analytics and key performance indicators to give the users information on where to focus their marketing and customer service. This allows agents to have access to a caller's history to provide personalized customer communication. The intention is to maximize average revenue per user, decrease churn rate and decrease idle and unproductive contact with the customers.

Growing in popularity is the idea of gamifying, or using game design elements and principles in a non-game environment, such as customer service settings. The gamification of customer service environments includes providing elements found in games, like rewards and bonus points, to customer service representatives as a method of feedback for a job well done. Gamification tools can motivate agents by tapping into their desire for rewards, recognition, achievements, and competition.

=== Contact-center automation ===
Contact-center automation, CCA, the practice of having an integrated system that coordinates contacts between an organization and the public, is designed to reduce the repetitive and tedious parts of a contact center agent's job. Automation prevents this by having pre-recorded audio messages that help customers solve their problems. For example, an automated contact center may be able to re-route a customer through a series of commands asking him or her to select a certain number to speak with a particular contact center agent who specializes in the field in which the customer has a question. Software tools can also integrate with the agent's desktop tools to handle customer questions and requests. This also saves time on behalf of the employees.

=== Social media ===
Social CRM involves the use of social media and technology to engage and learn from consumers. Because the public, especially young people, are increasingly using social networking sites, companies use these sites to draw attention to their products, services and brands, with the aim of building up customer relationships to increase demand. With the increase in the use of social media platforms, integrating CRM with the help of social media can potentially be a quicker and more cost-friendly process.

Some CRM systems integrate social media sites like Twitter, LinkedIn, and Facebook to track and communicate with customers. These customers also share their own opinions and experiences with a company's products and services, giving these firms more insight. Therefore, these firms can both share their own views and track the opinions of their customers.

Enterprise feedback management software platforms combine internal survey data with trends identified through social media to allow businesses to make more accurate decisions on which products to supply.

=== Location-based services ===
CRM systems can also include technologies that create geographic marketing campaigns. The systems take in information based on a customer's physical location and sometimes integrates it with popular location-based GPS applications. It can be used for networking or contact management as well to help increase sales based on location.

=== Business-to-business transactions ===
Despite the general notion that CRM systems were created for customer-centric businesses, they can also be applied to B2B environments to streamline and improve customer management conditions. For the best level of CRM operation in a B2B environment, the software must be personalized and delivered at individual levels.

The main differences between business-to-consumer (B2C) and business-to-business CRM systems concern aspects like sizing of contact databases and length of relationships.

== Market trends ==
=== Social networking ===
In the Gartner CRM Summit 2010 challenges like "system tries to capture data from social networking traffic like Twitter, handles Facebook page addresses or other online social networking sites" were discussed and solutions were provided that would help in bringing more clientele.

The era of the "social customer" refers to the use of social media by customers.

=== Mobile ===
Some CRM systems are equipped with mobile capabilities, making information accessible to remote sales staff.

=== Cloud computing and SaaS ===
Many CRM vendors offer subscription-based web tools (cloud computing) and SaaS. Salesforce.com was the first company to provide enterprise applications through a web browser, and has maintained its leadership position. Over the years, the number of SaaS providers has grown with CRM being the leading category for 2024.

Traditional providers moved into the cloud-based market via acquisitions of smaller providers: Oracle purchased RightNow in October 2011, and Taleo and Eloqua in 2012; SAP acquired SuccessFactors in December 2011 and NetSuite acquired Verenia in 2022.

=== Sales and sales force automation ===
Sales forces also play an important role in CRM, as maximizing sales effectiveness and increasing sales productivity is a driving force behind the adoption of CRM software. Some of the top CRM trends identified in 2021 include focusing on customer service automation such as chatbots, hyper-personalization based on customer data and insights, and the use of unified CRM systems. CRM vendors support sales productivity with different products, such as tools that measure the effectiveness of ads that appear in 3D video games.

Pharmaceutical companies were some of the first investors in sales force automation (SFA) and some are on their third- or fourth-generation implementations. However, until recently, the deployments did not extend beyond SFA—limiting their scope and interest to Gartner analysts.

=== Vendor relationship management ===
Another related development is vendor relationship management (VRM), which provide tools and services that allow customers to manage their individual relationship with vendors. VRM development has grown out of efforts by ProjectVRM at Harvard's Berkman Center for Internet & Society and Identity Commons' Internet Identity Workshops, as well as by a growing number of startups and established companies. VRM was the subject of a cover story in the May 2010 issue of CRM Magazine.

=== Customer success ===
Another trend worth noting is the rise of Customer Success as a discipline within companies. More and more companies establish Customer Success teams as separate from the traditional Sales team and task them with managing existing customer relations. This trend fuels demand for additional capabilities for a more holistic understanding of customer health, which is a limitation for many existing vendors in the space. As a result, a growing number of new entrants enter the market while existing vendors add capabilities in this area to their suites.

=== AI and predictive analytics ===
In 2017, artificial intelligence and predictive analytics were identified as the newest trends in CRM.

== Criticism ==
Companies face large challenges when trying to implement CRM systems. Consumer companies frequently manage their customer relationships haphazardly and unprofitably. They may not effectively or adequately use their connections with their customers, due to misunderstandings or misinterpretations of a CRM system's analysis. Clients may be treated like an exchange party, rather than a unique individual, due to, occasionally, a lack of a bridge between the CRM data and the CRM analysis output. Many studies show that customers are frequently frustrated by a company's inability to meet their relationship expectations, and on the other side, companies do not always know how to translate the data they have gained from CRM software into a feasible action plan. In 2003, a Gartner report estimated that more than $2 billion had been spent on software that was not being used. According to CSO Insights, less than 40 percent of 1,275 participating companies had end-user adoption rates above 90 percent. Many corporations only use CRM systems on a partial or fragmented basis. In a 2007 survey from the UK, four-fifths of senior executives reported that their biggest challenge is getting their staff to use the systems they had installed. Forty-three percent of respondents said they use less than half the functionality of their existing systems. However, market research regarding consumers' preferences may increase the adoption of CRM among developing countries' consumers.

Collection of customer data such as personally identifiable information must strictly obey customer privacy laws, which often requires extra expenditures on legal support.

Part of the paradox with CRM stems from the challenge of determining exactly what CRM is and what it can do for a company. The CRM paradox, also referred to as the "dark side of CRM", may entail favoritism and differential treatment of some customers. This can happen because a business prioritizes customers who are more profitable, more relationship-orientated or tend to have increased loyalty to the company. Although focusing on such customers by itself is not a bad thing, it can leave other customers feeling left out and alienated, potentially decreasing profits.

CRM technologies can easily become ineffective if there is no proper management, and they are not implemented correctly. The data sets must also be connected, distributed, and organized properly so that the users can access the information that they need quickly and easily. Research studies also show that customers are increasingly becoming dissatisfied with contact center experiences due to lags and wait times. They also request and demand multiple channels of communication with a company, and these channels must transfer information seamlessly. Therefore, it is increasingly important for companies to deliver a cross-channel customer experience that can be both consistent as well as reliable.

== See also ==
- Comparison of CRM systems
- Corporate social responsibility – Form of corporate self-regulation aimed at contributing to social or charitable goals
- Customer value model – Representation of the monetary worth of what a company could do for its customers
- Farley file – Set of records kept by politicians
- History of marketing
- Healthcare CRM
- Intersubjectivity – Concept in philosophy and psychology
- Relationship marketing – Form of marketing focused on customer retention
- Socially responsible marketing – Marketing philosophy
- Sustainable market orientation
- Vendor relationship management

== Sources ==
- Buttle, Francis (2004). Customer Relationship Management. doi:10.4324/9780080472430. ISBN 978-0-08-047243-0.
