= Comparison of CRM systems =

This article is a comparison of notable customer relationship management (CRM) systems.

Enterprise resource planning (ERP) systems are considered a superset of CRM systems.

== General ==
Only stable releases are mentioned.

Systems	Creator	Last Stable Version	Release date	License	Implementation language(s)	AI	Server Operating System	Database backend	First Release Date
Act! CRM	Pat Sullivan and Mike Muhney	22.1	June 2020	Proprietary or SaaS	C#, .NET	Yes	Windows, Web, iOS, Android	MS SQL	1987
Adempiere	Jorg Janke	3.9.3	December 2019	GPLv2	Java	No	Windows, Linux, Unix, Mac		2006
Base CRM/Zendesk	Base CRM	2016	2009	SaaS	Ruby on Rails, Python	Yes	Cloud Computing, iOS, Android, Windows Phone	MySQL	2009
Booksy	Booksy	2026	2026	SaaS	Python, Vue.js	Yes	Cloud Computing, iOS, Android	PostgreSQL	2014
Capsule (CRM)	Zestia Ltd.	2019	2009	SaaS	Java, Scala and JavaScript	Yes	Web, iOS, Android	MySQL	2009
CiviCRM	Dave Greenberg, Donald Lobo, Michal Mach	5.57	January 2023	AGPLv3	PHP 7.2+	Yes	Cross-platform	MySQL 5.7+ or MariaDB 10.0+	2004
Close	Close, Inc.	2013	2011	SaaS		Yes	Web, iOS, Android		2013
Dolibarr	Rodolphe Quiedeville, Laurent Destailleur	13.0.3	June 2021	GPLv3 or SaaS	PHP 5.6.x, 7.x	Yes	Cross-platform	MySQL or PostgreSQL	2003
Dynamics CRM	Microsoft	Dynamics 365 9.1	July 2019	Proprietary or SaaS	.NET, ASP.NET	Yes	Windows	MS SQL	2003
GNU Enterprise	FSF			GPLv3	Python	No, this project has been decommissioned	Linux, Unix, Mac OS X, Windows	Firebird/Interbase, MySQL, MaxDB, MS ADO (MS SQL-Server/MS Access), Oracle, PostgreSQL, SQLite, SQLite3, CSV files, DBF files (DBase, XBase etc.), INI style configuration files	2003
GroupOffice	Intermesh BV	26.0.7	February 2026	AGPLv3, SaaS and proprietary	PHP/JavaScript	No	Windows, Linux, Unix, Mac OS	MySQL	2003
HubSpot CRM Free	HubSpot	—N/a	—N/a	SaaS	Java	Yes	Cloud computing	HBase	2014
Neolane	Adobe	v6	2012	Proprietary or SaaS	C++, JavaScript	Yes	Windows, Linux	MS SQL, Oracle, PostgreSQL, MySQL	2001
Oracle Advertising and Customer Experience (CX)	Oracle Corporation	2021	Sept 2021	Proprietary or SaaS	Java, PL/SQL, C/C++, Python	Yes	Cloud computing	Oracle Database	2011
Pega CRM	Chordiant	?	?	Proprietary	?	Yes	Windows, Linux, Mac, web browser	?	?
Pipedrive	Pipedrive	2018	2018	SaaS	JavaScript, PHP	Yes	Web, iOS, Android	MySQL	2011
Pivotal CRM / Aptean CRM	Aptean	6.6	January 2019	Proprietary	.NET	Yes	Windows	MS SQL, Oracle	1996
Really Simple Systems / Spotler CRM	Really Simple Systems	2016	2006	SaaS	VBScript, JavaScript, ASP	Yes	Cloud Computing	MySQL	2006
SageCRM	Sage Group	Sage CRM 2019 R1	February 2019	Proprietary or SaaS	ASP.NET, ASP	Yes	Windows	MS SQL, ORACLE, DB2	1981
Salesbox CRM	Salesbox CRM	2019	2019	SaaS	JS, React	Yes	Web, iOS, Android	PostgreSQL	2014
Salesforce.com	Marc Benioff	Winter '21	June 2019	Proprietary	APEX (Proprietary Language Java-like)	Yes	Cloud Computing	Proprietary	1999
SAP CRM	SAP SE	7.0 EHP4 SP11	2018	Proprietary	ABAP	Yes	Windows, Linux, Unix	SAP HANA, MS SQL, Oracle	2000
SAP Cloud for Customer	SAP SE	1811	2018	Proprietary	ABAP	Yes	Linux	SAP HANA	2009
Snapforce CRM	Snapforce CRM	2016	2013	SaaS	PHP	No	Cloud Computing	MySQL	2011
SugarCRM	John Roberts, Clint Oram, Jacob Taylor	9.0.1	June 2019	Proprietary or SaaS	PHP	Yes	Cross-platform	MySQL, Microsoft SQL Server, IBM DB2, and Oracle (IBM DB2 and Oracle only available for Sugar Enterprise edition)	2004
SuiteCRM	SuiteCRM Ltd	8.9.2	January 2026	AGPLv3	PHP	Yes	Cross-platform	MariaDB, MySQL, Microsoft SQL Server	2013
SuperOffice CRM	SuperOffice	7.5	2014	Proprietary	C++, C# and ASP.NET	Yes	Windows	SQL Server	1990
OnlyOffice	Ascensio System SIA	10.5.1	December 2019	GPLv3, SaaS	ASP.NET	Yes	Windows	Microsoft SQL Server, Amazon Server	2010
Tryton	Tryton	5.6	May 2020	GPLv3	Python, JavaScript	No	Cross-platform	PostgreSQL, MySQL, SQLite	2008
WORKetc	Daniel Barnett	v4.0	2013	SaaS	C#, .NET	No	Windows	Microsoft SQL Server, Amazon Server	2009
Zoho CRM	Zoho CRM	Zoho CRM 2018	2018	SaaS	Java	Yes	Cloud Computing, Cross Platform	Proprietary	1999

== Features ==
System	Office Integration	Multi Lingual	Languages Supported	Web-Based	Time Tracking	Attaching Emails to Business Objects	Desktop environment	Global Search	LDAP Support
Act! CRM	Yes	Yes	en, de, fr	Yes			Yes	Yes	No
Adempiere	?	?	?	?	?	?	?	?	?
Base CRM	Yes	Yes	de, en, es, fr, nl, pl, pt	Yes	Yes	Yes	No	Yes	No
Booksy	Yes	Yes	en, pl, es, pt, fr, de, uk, vi, zh	Yes	Yes	Yes	No	Yes	No
Capsule (CRM)	Gmail G Suite	No	en	Yes	No	Yes	Yes	Yes	?
CiviCRM	?	Yes	Yes Over 40	Yes Integrated with Drupal, Wordpress, Joomla! or Backdrop	Yes through Agiliway's Time Tracker or CiviMobile	Yes (when email is sent from software)	?	Yes	?
Dolibarr	A module google is available for customer and agenda sync	Yes	Over 30	Yes	Yes	Yes (when email is sent from software)	?	Yes	Yes
Microsoft Dynamics CRM	Yes	Yes	Yes over 40	Yes	Yes	Yes	No	Yes	Yes with ADFS
GNU Enterprise	Yes	Yes	Yes	Yes	Yes	?	?	?	?
Group-Office	Yes	Yes	Over 20 languages	Yes	Yes	?	?	?	?
HubSpot CRM Free	Gmail, G Suite, Outlook, Office 365 for Windows	Yes	en, fr, jp, de, pt, es	Yes	No	Yes	Yes	Yes	No
Neolane	?	?	?	?	?	?	?	?	?
OnlyOffice	Yes	Yes	en, de, fr, es, it, ru, lat	Yes	Yes	?	?	?	?
Oracle Advertising and Customer Experience (CX)	Yes	Yes	26 languages	Yes	No	Yes	Yes	Yes	Yes
Pega CRM	?	?	?	?	?	?	?	Maybe	Yes
Pipedrive	Yes	Yes	de, en, es, et, fi, fr, it, no, nl, pl, pt, ru, tr, ko, ja	Yes	Yes	Yes	Yes	Yes	Yes
Pivotal CRM	Yes	Yes	Yes	Web/Windows	?	Yes	?	Yes	Yes
Really Simple Systems	Yes	No	en	Yes	No	?	?	?	?
SageCRM	Yes	Yes	Yes	Yes	Yes	Yes	Yes	Yes	?
Salesbox CRM	Yes	Yes	de, en, es, fr, nl, pt, se, no, fi, tr, ro, ru, jp, ch, ko, hu	Yes	Yes	Yes	Yes	Yes	No
Salesforce.com	Yes	Yes	en, fi, fr, de, es, it, ja, ko, pt-br, ru, sv, th, zh-cn, zh-tw, da, nl-nl	Yes	Yes	Yes	No	Yes	Yes
Siebel	Yes	Yes	Yes	Yes	No	Yes	?	?	Yes
SAP CRM	Yes	Yes	Yes	Yes	No	Yes	Yes	Yes	Yes
Snapforce CRM	Yes	Yes	de, en, es, et, fi, fr, it, nl, pl, pt, tr, ko, ja, ru	Yes	No	Yes	?	Yes	Yes
SugarCRM	Yes - Outlook, Excel, Word Plugins	Yes	sq_AL, ar_SA, bg_BG, ca_ES, zh_CN, hr_HR, cs_CZ, da_DK, nl_NL, en_UK, en_us, et_EE, fi_FI, fr_FR, de_DE, el_EL, he_IL, hu_HU, it_it, ja_JP, ko_KR, lv_LV, lt_LT, nb_NO, pl_PL, pt_PT, pt_BR, ro_RO, ru_RU, sr_RS, sk_SK, es_ES, es_LA, sv_SE, th_TH, zh_TW, tr_TR, uk_UA	Yes	Yes	Yes	?	Yes	Yes
SuiteCRM	Via Plugin	Yes	20 languages	Yes	Yes	Yes	No	Yes	Yes
SuperOfficeCRM	Yes	Yes	cn, de, dk, en, es, fi, fr, it, jp, nl, no, ru, se, zh	Yes	Yes	?	?	?	?
Tryton	?	Yes	bg, ca, cs, de, en, es-ar, es-co, es-es, fr, nl, ru, sl	Yes	Yes	Yes	Yes	Yes	Yes
WORKetc	Outlook Addon and Google Docs	Yes	de, en, es, fr, it, nl	Yes	Yes	Yes	?	Yes	?
Zoho CRM	Outlook & MS Office	Yes	en, fi, fr, de, es, it, ja, ko, pt-br, ru, sv, th, zh-cn, zh-tw, da, nl-nl, pl	Yes	Yes	Yes	?	Yes	Yes

== See also ==
- Comparison of mobile CRM systems
- List of ERP software packages (Enterprise Resource Planning)
- Customer relationship management (CRM)
