= Comparison of mobile CRM systems =

This article is a comparison of notable mobile CRM systems.

ERP systems are considered a superset of CRM systems.

== Introduction ==
The market for mobile CRM applications is currently seeing record growth as new products and services around mobile CRM are being developed. The benefits of mobile CRM application have been demonstrated in a paper by Grandhi & Chugh (2012) through the case of Dow Corning and DirecTV where the introduction of SAP CRM system helped to improve their customer relations. Analysis of the two organisations revealed that mobile CRM applications are not only helping them to improve relationship with customers, but also helping to reduce the costs of acquiring new customers.

== General ==
Only stable releases are considered.

System	Creator	Last Updated	Android Tablet Application	iOS Tablet Application	Mobile Platforms	Offline Access	Free Mobile Access
Base CRM	Base CRM	2026	Yes	Yes	iOS, Android, Windows Phone	Yes	Yes
Booksy	Booksy	2026	Yes	Yes	iOS, Android	Partial	Yes
Capsule (CRM)	Zestia Ltd.	2026	Yes	Yes	iOS, Android,	Yes	Yes
Microsoft Dynamics CRM	Microsoft	2015	Yes/Third Party	Yes/Third party	Windows Phone	Yes	Yes
Oracle CRM	Oracle Corporation	2013	Yes	Yes	iOS, Android	Yes	Yes
Pipedrive	Pipedrive	2026	Yes	Yes	iOS, Android,	Yes	Yes
Salesforce	Marc Benioff	2013	Yes	Yes	iOS, Android	Yes	Yes
SAP CRM	SAP	2013	Yes	Yes	iOS, Android	Yes	Yes
SugarCRM	SugarCRM	2019	Yes	Yes	iOS, Android	Yes	Yes
Zoho CRM	ZOHO Corporation	2019	Yes	Yes	iOS, Android	Yes	No

== See also ==
- Comparison of CRM systems
- List of ERP software packages (Enterprise Resource Planning)
- Customer relationship management (CRM)
