= CDC MarketFirst =

Business software

MarketFirst
- Developers: Avolin (formerly Aptean, CDC Software, Pivotal Corporation)
- Initial release: 1997; 28 years ago
- Operating system: Microsoft Windows
- Type: Marketing automation
- License: Proprietary
- Website: www.avolin.com

MarketFirst is a marketing automation and campaign management software platform originally developed in the late 1990s by MarketFirst Software Inc., based in Mountain View, California.

The product provided tools for campaign design, customer segmentation, lead management, and multichannel marketing execution. It became one of the early enterprise marketing automation systems to integrate with customer relationship management (CRM) platforms.

== History ==
In October 2002, Pivotal Corporation announced it would acquire MarketFirst to strengthen its CRM suite with integrated marketing automation capabilities.

Following the acquisition, MarketFirst technology was embedded into the Pivotal CRM platform and marketed as Pivotal MarketFirst. In February 2004, CDC Software, then a subsidiary of chinadotcom corporation, acquired Pivotal Corporation, bringing MarketFirst under the CDC Software brand.

In 2012, CDC Software merged with Consona Corporation to form Aptean, which continued to support the legacy MarketFirst product line within its enterprise applications portfolio.

In October 2018, Aptean sold its Vertical Business Applications division, including MarketFirst and Pivotal CRM, to ESW Capital, which transferred the assets into its new subsidiary, Avolin.

== Features ==
MarketFirst offered tools for:

- Campaign design and workflow automation
- Customer segmentation and profiling
- Multi-channel campaign execution (email, web, direct mail)
- Lead management and scoring
- Reporting and analytics

The system integrated with major CRM platforms including Pivotal CRM and other enterprise data systems.

== Customers and case studies ==
Customers included companies such as Harvey Nichols, the UK-based luxury retailer, Softrax Corporation, a provider of enterprise billing and revenue management, online job website Careerbuilder; and luxury home builder Toll Brothers, among others.

MarketFirst was used by a number of large enterprises in the early 2000s. Documented public case studies include:

- Sharp Electronics– implemented MarketFirst to automate campaign management and increase marketing ROI, reporting a ten-fold increase in qualified leads and annual cost savings of approximately US$1.6 million.
- Vantage Deluxe World Travel – adopted MarketFirst in 2002 to accelerate campaign execution and leverage its customer database for targeted marketing programs.

Other publicly referenced customers included WellCare, Premera Blue Cross, Standard & Poor’s, and CareerBuilder.

== Legacy ==
As of the late 2010s, MarketFirst remains part of Avolin’s legacy software portfolio, with ongoing maintenance and support for existing customers. However, it is considered a legacy on-premises marketing automation platform, largely supplanted in the broader market by modern cloud-based systems such as Marketo, Oracle Eloqua, and HubSpot.

== See also ==
- Pivotal CRM
- Aptean
- Marketing automation
