= Zoho =

Zoho can refer to:

== Business ==
- Zoho Corporation, an Indian multinational technology company

- Zoho Office Suite, bundled business productivity software
- Zoho CRM, customer relationship management software

== Music ==
- Zoho Music, a New York-based Latin jazz independent record label
