= Common bond =

Common bond may refer to:

- Common bond of association among members of credit unions and cooperative banks
- Common bond (bricklaying), a kind of bond in bricklaying
- Common Bond (magazine), a journal on the maintenance of religious buildings published by the New York Landmarks Conservancy
- CommonBond, a crowdsourced, peer-to-peer loan platform for American university students
- Human bonding, the process of development of a close, interpersonal relationship between two or more people
