= Harry R. Jacobson =

American physician executive, entrepreneur

Harry R. Jacobson (born June 21, 1947) is an American physician executive and entrepreneur who served as the vice chancellor for health affairs and CEO of Vanderbilt University Medical Center from 1997 to 2009.

== Early life and education ==
Jacobson was born on June 21, 1947 in Freising, Germany, a town in upper Bavaria north of Munich. He immigrated to the United States in 1951, and his family settled in the South Side of Chicago. He spent his childhood in Chicago and received his Bachelor of Science from the University of Illinois, Urbana-Champaign in 1969. Jacobson then completed his Doctorate of Medicine at the University of Illinois Abraham Lincoln School of Medicine in 1972. Jacobson trained in medicine at the Johns Hopkins Hospital then moved to Dallas, Texas to complete his fellowship in nephrology at the University of Texas Southwestern, where he specialized in kidney failure and diseases.

Jacobson served in the US Army following the completion of his fellowship under the Berry Plan. From 1976 to 1978, Jacobson served as the chief of the renal section at the US Army Surgical Research Center at Brooke Army Medical Center in San Antonio, Texas.

== Career ==
=== University of Texas Southwestern (1978-1985) ===
After the completion of his military service under the Berry Plan, Jacobson returned to the University of Texas Southwestern as an assistant professor of internal medicine and was quickly promoted to an associate professor of internal medicine. Jacobson spent 7 years as a faculty member at UT Southwestern at Parkland Hospital in Dallas before moving his family to Nashville, Tennessee to join the medical faculty at Vanderbilt University Medical Center (VUMC) in 1985.

=== Vanderbilt University Medical Center (1985-2009) ===
Jacobson served as a professor of medicine and the director of the division of nephrology at VUMC from 1985 to 1995. During the same time, Jacobson was also a staff physician and nephrologist at the Veterans Administration Hospital in Nashville. He was promoted to vice chancellor for health affairs and CEO of VUMC in 1997 and served in this role until 2009, when he retired from academia.

During his tenure as CEO of the medical center, revenues grew from $750 million to more than $2.5 billion. Annual research funding quadrupled to more than $400 million, and NIH-funded research rankings improved from 24th in the nation to top 10. Jacobson oversaw more than $1 billion in the development of new clinical and research facilities. He was also in charge during the construction of the Monroe Carell Jr. Children's Hospital and Vanderbilt Health at One Hundred Oaks. By his retirement in 2009, Vanderbilt was named one of the top 100 best places to work by Fortune magazine, the first educational institution to be named to the list.

Jacobson helped establish the $10 million Chancellor's Fund in 1999, which helped launch 18 companies in conjunction with the university's technology transfer office. The Academic Venture Capital Fund was a later version of the Chancellor's Fund which nurtured cross-institutional projects, including imaging science and institutes of biology. One of the more notable companies derived from venture capital through the Chancellors' Fund was Informatics Corporation of America (ICA), on which Jacobson served as the chairman. While at Vanderbilt but before assuming his position as CEO, Jacobson co-founded Contact Software, which was acquired by Symantec (NASDAQ: SYMC). It became one of the first movers in CRM software and one of the first business solutions for Windows operating system through its product, ACT!. Overall, in his role at VUMC, Jacobson oversaw technology transfer and made direct investments in 30 early-stage companies launched from Vanderbilt IP and ideas.

In 1999, Jacobson helped VUMC establish a formal alliance with Meharry Medical College to enhance educational, clinical, and scientific programs between both institutions. By 2002, Vanderbilt University Hospital earned an "honor roll" position of the nation's best hospitals in U.S. News & World Report for the first time. Jacobson reinforced a strong commitment to biomedical informatics, and he viewed VUMC as a demonstration project for the power and potential of health IT to improve health outcomes. President George W. Bush visited Vanderbilt in 2004 to inspect the computer system. From 1997 to 2009, Jacobson oversaw the completion of the Page-Campbell Heart Institute, the Ingram Cancer Center, the Vanderbilt Comprehensive Diabetes Center, the Vanderbilt Brain Institute, the Monroe Carell Jr. Children's Hospital, the Bill Wilkerson Center for Otolaryngology and Communication Sciences, the Orthopedic Institute, the Eskind Diabetes Center, the Vanderbilt Heart and Vascular Institute, the Center for Stem Cell Biology, a 102-bed Critical Care Tower, and Vanderbilt Health at One Hundred Oaks.

Under his leadership, the Medical Center's budget grew more than 300%, and Vanderbilt became a top 10 funded research university. Jacobson retired from Vanderbilt and academia in 2009.

=== Entrepreneurship and post-academic career ===
Throughout his career, Jacobson has been a successful investor and entrepreneur. He has founded or co-founded several notable companies, including Contact Software, Renal Care Group, Cardiovascular Care Group, Informatics Corporation of America, CeloNova Biosciences, Ambulatory Services of America, and MindCare Solutions, Innovative Renal Care, and ForBetterHealth.

While at Vanderbilt, Jacobson co-founded Renal Care Group (NYSE: RCG) and served as chairman. RCG was a dialysis service provider that owned more than 425 dialysis clinics and served more than 30,000 patients. In 2004, RCG's revenue was approximately $1.35 billion with an EBIT of $254 million and a net income of $122 million. RCG was acquired by Fresenius Medical Care (NYSC: FMS) in 2005 for approximately $4.0 billion.

Jacobson serves on the board of several health care-oriented companies, and he has served on the board of three New York Stock Exchange companies, including Merck (NYSE: MRK), Renal Care Group (NYSE: RCG), and Kinetic Concepts (NYSE: KCI). He was also a member of the board of directors for BioNumerik Pharmaceutical from 2009 to 2016, for Ingram Industries from 2003 to 2020, and for CeloNova Biosciences, which was acquired by Boston Scientific (NYSE: BSX) in 2016. Jacobson is currently a board member for Seno Medical Instruments, Gradalis, Inc., Refocus Group, Inc., MindCare Solutions, Salus, Inc., and is the executive chairman of ForBetterHealth.

Following his retirement from VUMC in 2009, Jacobson served as the chairman of MedCare Investment Funds until 2017. He remained at MedCare, investing more than $600 million into a portfolio of 14 companies. While at MedCare, Jacobson launched an early-stage venture fund called TriStar Technology Ventures. The first TriStar fund was funded in 2010 through a State of Tennessee economic development initiative.

== Awards and influence ==
Jacobson was named the 2002 Ernst and Young Southeast Entrepreneur of the Year, and he recently ranked number 35 on Modern Healthcare's "50 Most Powerful Physicians in Healthcare." He served as the chair of the Nashville Health Care Council from 2006 to 2008, and he was inducted into the Tennessee Health Care Hall of Fame in 2017. He also received the McWhorter Society Distinguished Service Award from Belmont University in 2018, and he was the inaugural recipient of the Crystal Leaf Award for fostering innovation in the health care industry in 2009. Jacobson is both Phi Beta Kappa and Alpha Omega Alpha. In 2018, the Nashville Business Journal honored Jacobson with a lifetime achievement award. Most notably, Jacobson was elected to the Institute of Medicine of the National Academy of Sciences in 2002.

Jacobson has been an active member of the Nashville community. He has been on the steering committee of Leadership Nashville since 1998, served on the board of directors of the Community Foundation of Middle Tennessee from 2007 to 2010, and has been on the advisory council of the Family Foundation Fund since 1999. He was the chairman of the Boy Scouts of America, Middle Tennessee Council, from 2005 to 2007, was on the board of the Nashville Symphony Association from 2007 to 2010, and was on the board of the Nashville Metro Hospital Authority from 2011 to 2017. In addition, Jacobson has remained active with the American Red Cross and championed its support in Middle Tennessee.

== Books and publications ==
Jacobson has authored and co-authored two full-length books, including The Principles and Practice of Nephrology and Begin Again Now: The Path to Fixing Health Care. In addition, Jacobson has published more than 100 academic research papers.
