= Hany Rashwan =

Egyptian businessman and computer engineer (born 1990)

Hany Rashwan هاني رشوان
- Born: May 7, 1990 (age 36); Cairo, Egypt
- Citizenship: Egyptian
- Education: Columbia University
- Known for: Co-founder & CEO of 21.co

Hany Rashwan (Arabic: هاني رشوان; born May 7, 1990) is an Egyptian businessman, entrepreneur, and computer engineer. He is a founder of cryptocurrency company 21.co, the parent company of 21Shares. He previously founded a social commerce company, Ribbon, and an enterprise fintech company, Payout.com.

== Early life and education ==
Rashwan was born in Cairo, Egypt and grew up in Alexandria. His grandfather, a career intelligence officer in the Egyptian army and an expert at cryptography and programming, bought Rashwan his first computer aged 11 and taught him basic programming. After moving to the United States for high school, he built two gaming sites aged 14, with one attracting 600,000 unique annual visitors and advertising revenue.

He attended Ohio State University in 2008 to study economics and computer science, before transferring to Columbia University until dropping out to start Payout.com.

== Companies ==
=== Kolena ===
While an undergraduate, Rashwan built Kolena (meaning "all of us" in Arabic), an online interactive town-hall using Facebook Connect that was used by tens of thousands of Egyptians during the Egyptian revolution. In an interview, Rashwan envisioned Kolena serving as “Egypt’s online interactive Town lady Meeting…a place for people to go to submit and vote on ideas for change." Needs relevant source **dead link**

=== Ribbon ===
Ribbon was a payments startup that let users sell online using a shortened URL that can be shared across email, social media and a seller's own website. The service focuses on bringing integrated checkouts directly to platforms like Facebook, YouTube, and Twitter letting buyers purchase without leaving those services. Ribbon has been featured in publications including Techcrunch, Wall Street Journal, Entrepreneur, The Next Web, and ArsTechnica.

After the company announced support for "in-stream" payments on Twitter, allowing buyers to purchase items without leaving the Twitter.com stream, Twitter shut down Ribbon's API access after approximately an hour and a half.

=== Payout.com ===
Founded in late 2014, Payout provides online lenders with a payouts, disbursements and compliance API that is used by top online lenders such as LendUp and Prosper. Lenders are able to push money to consumers' credit cards in real-time. The company moved more than $50 million in loans by its second year. Payout went through the AngelPad accelerator and subsequently raised $4.75 million, led by Tim Draper of Draper Associates.

In 2017, he was named to the 2017 Forbes 30 Under 30 list in the Enterprise Technology for Payout.

=== 21Shares ===
Rashwan met Ophelia Snyder in 2011 in San Francisco, where they discovered bitcoin. In 2018, they founded 21.co (formerly Amun), which aims to build bridges into the cryptocurrency world. Its subsidiary 21Shares AG launched the first physically backed cryptocurrency Exchange-traded product (ETP) called HODL in November 2018 on the SIX Swiss Exchange. According to the company, it is one of the largest issuers of crypto exchange-traded products.

In addition to 21Shares ETFs, 21.co also owns tokens platform Amun as well as its own proprietary platform Onyx, which is used to issue and operate crypto ETPs for the company and third parties.

A $4 million seed round was raised in March 2019 from investors including Cathie Wood and Graham Tuckwell. In September 2022, the company announced a second round of $25 million raised at a $2 billion valuation, with company "on a nine-figure revenue run-rate [with] sustained inflows, even during down markets." The company announced recording $650 million in net new assets, with assets under management peaking in 2021 at $3 billion.
