= Trefler =

Trefler is a surname. Notable people with the surname include:

- Alan Trefler (born 1956), American businessman and chess player
- Daniel Trefler (born 1959), Canadian economist
