= Joshua Stein =

Joshua Stein could refer to:

- Josh Stein (born 1966), Governor of North Carolina
- Josh B. Stein (born 1973), American businessman

== See also ==
- Joshua Steiner, American business executive
