= Salesbox CRM =

- Company type: Private
- Industry: Software as a Service
- Founded: 2014
- Headquarters: Stockholm Sweden
- Services: Sales management Customer relationship management Lead generation Marketing
- Website: salesbox.com

Salesbox CRM is a Sales CRM tool from Stockholm, Sweden. It is designed as an integrated end-to-end application (OMNI-channel) for sales administration.

== History ==
Salesbox CRM was founded in 2014 and the system can be accessed worldwide, and is available in 16 languages, including English, Spanish, Portuguese, German and French.

Salesbox won the "Best Sales CRM Product or Service Award" at the Sales Innovation Expo in 2016.

== See also ==
- Sales management
- Customer relationship management
- Comparison of CRM systems
- Comparison of Mobile CRM systems
