= Ribbon (company) =

- Company type: Private
- Industry: Technology
- Founded: 2011
- Founder: Hany Rashwan
- Headquarters: San Francisco, California
- Website: www.ribbon.co

Ribbon was a San Francisco payments startup that lets users sell online using a shortened URL that can be shared across email, social media and a seller's own website. The service focuses on bring integrated checkouts directly to platforms like Facebook, YouTube, and Twitter letting buyers purchase without leaving those services.

The company graduated from a startup accelerator called AngelPad as "Kout" in October 2011 and subsequently raised $1.6 million from Tim Draper through Draper Associates, Naguib Sawiris, Emil Michael, Gokul Rajaram, and others bringing its total raised amount to $1.75 million.

== Twitter shutdown ==
On April 10, 2013, the company announced support for "in-stream" payments on Twitter, allowing buyers to purchase items without leaving the Twitter.com stream. Twitter shut down Ribbon's API access after approximately an hour and a half, according to Head of Business Development, Daniel Brusilovsky. Ribbon requested permission to show video cards, but after receiving permission then switched the url to show the hacked checkout system. The company wrote a statement announcing they will revert to showcasing only a summary of their product without the ability to do in-stream payments. As of April 11, 2013 Ribbon links inside Twitter no longer work in-stream and buyers are redirected to purchase on the Ribbon website.
