= Mikkel Svane =

Danish author and entrepreneur

- Born: 1971; Copenhagen, Denmark
- Education: Bachelor's in Economics
- Occupations: Entrepreneur and author
- Employer: Zendesk
- Notable work: Startupland
- Title: Founder

Mikkel Svane is the co-founder and former CEO of the software company Zendesk. He has written Startupland, documenting his experiences of starting his company.

== Early life and education ==
Svane was born in Copenhagen, Denmark in 1971. He became interested in computer programming when he was 11 years-old. As a child, he created basic computer games. He served in the Danish military and earned a degree in economics in the early 1990s.

== Career ==
After college, Svane started a business creating stereograms. He authored a book and created software to help others make stereograms themselves. Svane also created a website for free news and event listings called Forum.dk. Forum.dk was purchased by a newspaper, but Svane retained ownership of the software that ran it.

The Forum.dk software became the basis of Caput A/S, a startup Svane created in 1996 that sold software to run the websites of media companies. Caput went out of business as a result of the crash following the dot-com bubble. In 2002, Svane got his first traditional job when he was recruited as General Manager at a German business consulting firm called Materna. He left that position in the Summer of 2005 and started doing his own freelance consulting work.

Svane was in his mid-30s when he founded Zendesk with two of his friends, Alexander Aghassipour and Morten Primdahl. Initially, the founders funded the company themselves, while working consulting gigs on the side. They developed the software in Svane's apartment in Copenhagen, Denmark, using an old door as a desk to work upon, which later hung in the Zendesk headquarters as the original 'Zen desk'. Svane later said that he became CEO in 2007 because the other two co-founders were busy writing code.

Svane moved the company to California in 2009. Svane led the company's ongoing expansion and its initial public offering in 2014. In 2014, Svane published a book about his life and starting Zendesk called "Startupland: How Three Guys Risked Everything to Turn an Idea into a Global Business." The book details Svane's early work creating the company and raising venture capital. In June 2022, Zendesk was acquired by a group of investment firms including Hellman & Friedman and Permira, in a deal that valued Zendesk at $10.2 billion. On November 28, 2022, Svane stepped down as CEO of Zendesk.
