= Josh B. Stein =

American businessman (born 1973)

- Born: May 3, 1973 (age 53); Palo Alto, California, United States
- Education: Dartmouth College and Stanford University Graduate School of Business
- Occupation: Venture capitalist
- Website: threshold.vc

Josh Stein is an American venture capitalist and businessman. He is managing partner at Threshold Ventures (formed out of Draper Fisher Jurvetson), and held or holds board responsibilities at a number of startup companies. As of 2020, this included Box, Chartbeat, LaunchDarkley, LendKey, Lumity, and Talkdesk. He led Box’s first round of institutional investment. He is also an investor in AngelList, Doximity, Front, Loftium, Periscope Data acquired by Sisense, and Rippling.

He was featured in the Forbes Midas List in 2013, 2014 and 2015 in recognition of his accomplishments as an investor. He was also the recipient of the 2015 Deloitte Fast 500 Venture Capitalist of the Year award.

== Early life and education ==
Stein earned an M.B.A from the Stanford University Graduate School of Business and his B.A. from Dartmouth College.

== Career ==
Prior to joining DFJ, Stein was a co-founder, director and chief strategy officer for ViaFone, a DFJ-backed startup that created wireless enterprise applications. Stein previously held positions in product management at Microsoft and NetObjects, and was a management consultant in the San Francisco office of the Boston Consulting Group.

Stein is a graduate of the Kauffman Fellows Program.

=== Draper Fisher Jurvetson ===
Stein joined Draper Fisher Jurvetson (DFJ) in 2004. His previous investments include Redfin, Twilio, SugarCRM, Swell (acquired by Apple), Eventful (acquired by CBS Local), GoodGuide (acquired by UL), iList (acquired by IGN/News Corp), Polaris Wireless (strategic recapitalization), Yammer (acquired by Microsoft), and Yardbarker (acquired by Fox Sports Interactive).

== Personal ==
He serves on the board of trustees of the Crystal Springs Uplands School and the Stanford GSB Trust.
