= CiviCRM =

Constituency relationship management suite

- Developer: CiviCRM LLC
- Release: March 2005; 21 years ago
- Stable release: 6.17 / August 5, 2026; 28 days ago
- Written in: PHP (8.0+)
- Type: Customer Relationship Management
- License: AGPLv3
- Website: civicrm.org
- Repository: lab.civicrm.org/dev/core

CiviCRM (/ˈsɪvi ˌsiːɑːrˈɛm/ SIV-ee C-R-M) is a web-based suite of internationalized open-source software for constituency relationship management that falls under the broad rubric of customer relationship management. It is specifically designed for the needs of non-profit, non-governmental, and advocacy groups, and serves as an association-management system.

CiviCRM is designed to manage information about an organization's donors, members, event registrants, subscribers, grant-application seekers and funders, and case contacts. Volunteers, activists, and voters – as well as more general sorts of business contacts such as employees, clients, or vendors – can be managed using CiviCRM.

== Description ==
CiviCRM's core system tracks contacts, relationships, activities, groups, tags and permissions, while additional components keep track of contributors (CiviContribute), events (CiviEvent), member lists (CiviMember), cases (CiviCase), grants (CiviGrant), campaigns (CiviCampaign), petitions (CiviPetition), bulk mailings (CiviMail), and reports (CiviReport). These components can be activated or deactivated to meet the needs of the specific organization. These and other features are also available on a smartphone through CiviMobile by Agiliway.

As of version 6.0, CiviCRM can be used by itself (standalone) or can be deployed in conjunction with either the Backdrop CMS, Drupal, Joomla! or WordPress content management systems (CMS). It is supported by many hosting and professional services companies and there is an official cloud-hosted version called CiviCRM Spark. Both the Drupal and Joomla! professional associations use CiviCRM. CiviCRM's license is the GNU AGPL 3.

There are a wide and growing number of integration modules with these CMSes to leverage their strengths. A large number of tokens are available for inclusion in HTML or plaintext emails, or for producing PDF files for printing. Data-integration formats supported include RSS, JSON, XML, and CSV. Supported programming interfaces include REST, server PHP and client JavaScript APIs, a CMS-agnostic extensions framework, and Drupal and Symfony style hooks.

There is a Mattermost community chat, and community and development discussion can be found on CiviCRM's Gitlab.

CiviCRM downloads are available from both the official site, CiviCRM.org, and SourceForge, where it was 'project of the month' for January 2011.

A number of notable optional extensions have been released over the years, including an integration with the responsive open source email template builder Mosacio, the RiverLea theme (a new default theme for the administrative interface), and the CiviRules extension (which allows the system to apply actions based on rulesets).

== Structure and finances ==
In 2010, the Free Software Foundation adopted CiviCRM after having been promoting it as a 'high-priority' project.

CiviCRM is incorporated in California as a limited liability company, but operates as a not-for-profit organization. The company registered its name and logo as a trademark in the United States in 2017.

The CiviCRM software can be downloaded and used at no cost, but organizations and individuals can pay for CiviCRM membership. The company also receives income from grants, sponsorships, and licensing of extended support releases. Third-party businesses which provide CiviCRM services can be granted partner status, and are encouraged to contribute a percentage of their income to the company.

Software development is by employees known as the Core Team, while many extensions and CMS modules are contributed by the community. GitLab is used for all software projects.

== Users ==
CiviCRM has been used by many large NGOs including the Canadian Ski Patrol, Creative Commons, the Free Software Foundation, CERN, Mozilla, the GNOME Foundation, and Wikimedia Foundation. CiviCRM has also been used by Kabissa to provide CRM capabilities to over 1,500 organizations, mostly in Africa and by the National Democratic Institute to provide CRM capabilities to emerging political parties in several countries.

Other users include the Green Party of England and Wales, the Institute of Fisheries Management, the Australian Greens, and the British Association of Social Workers.

== See also ==
- Comparison of CRM systems
- List of free and open-source software packages
