= EdFinancial Services =

Student loan financial company

EdFinancial Services is a financial company which provides student loans servicing for 15 of the top 100 lenders in the USA, including regional and national banks, secondary markets, state agencies and other student loan providers. It is headquartered in Knoxville, Tennessee.

== History ==
In 1988, CEO William A. Hollin (known as Tony Hollin) launched Educational Funding of the South, going by the name Edsouth, the precursor to EdFinancial Services, in Knoxville. With the backing of local underwriters, Hollin spent six years steadily building the company, going bank to bank buying student loans.

In 2004, Edsouth provided student loans mostly in the southeastern US, and had an income of over $150 million.

Instead of marketing predominantly to students like some of its competitors, it used a business-to-business strategy and communicated directly with financial aid administrators. The strategy worked, with a 70% annual growth rate over a five-year period, and an increase from $3 million to $35 million in annual revenue.

In 2002, the company launched eCampusTours.com, which purportedly claims to "allow students to search online for colleges". The website featured 360° by 360° virtual college tours of more than 11,000 college campuses, allowing students to see campus life through IPIX virtual tours.

In 2012, Edfinancial was awarded a contract by the US Dept. of Education to service student loans made under the Federal Direct Student Loan Program.

== Fines for Fraud and Failure to Meet Contractual Obligations ==
In 2022, The Consumer Financial Protection Bureau sanctioned Edfinancial Services for making deceptive statements to student loan borrowers and misrepresenting their forgiveness and repayment options to them. The Bureau ordered Edfinancial Services to contact all affected borrowers, provide them with accurate information, and pay a $1 million civil money penalty.

In 2024, the U.S. Department of Education announced it was withholding $161,000 in payments from EdFinancial. The Department found that three student loan servicers, Aidvantage, EdFinancial, and Nelnet all failed to meet contractual obligations to send timely billing statements to a combined total of 758,000 borrowers.
