= Pat Sullivan (programmer) =

American software engineer

Pat Sullivan is an American software engineer who co-created the contact manager ACT! along with his partner Mike Muhney. Sullivan was named one of the “80 Most Influential People in Sales and Marketing History” in 1998 by the magazine Sales & Marketing Management.

Pat Sullivan started Contact Software in Dallas, Texas in 1986. With his friend Mike Muhney and two programmers, Randy Haben and John Maurer, the team developed the first commercial version of the contact manager ACT! In 1993, ACT! was acquired by Symantec. In 1995, Pat Sullivan founded the sales force automation company SalesLogix. In 1999, SalesLogix Corp was renamed to Interact Commerce Corporation and ACT! was reacquired from Symantec. In May 2001, Sage Group plc acquired Interact Commerce Corporation.

In 2005, Pat Sullivan launched Jigsaw Health and published the book Wellness piece by piece to help the 125 million Americans suffering from chronic health conditions.

== Works ==
- Wellness Piece by Piece: How a Successful Entrepreneur Discovered the Pieces to His Chronic Health Puzzle. Health Press, 2005, ISBN 0-929173-46-5
- Getting Big Sh*t done:A Serial Startup Founder's Secret to Doing Big Things Ryver Inc, 2018, ISBN 0999732501
