= SplendidCRM =

- Type: Private
- Industry: CRM Software
- Founded: North Carolina 2005
- Headquarters: Raleigh, North Carolina
- Products: SplendidCRM Open Source, SplendidCRM Professional
- Services: Customer Relationship Management
- Number of employees: undisclosed
- Website: www.splendidcrm.com

SplendidCRM produces open source Customer Relationship Management (CRM) software developed in C# for the ASP.NET framework. The product is available in two editions — Open Source and Professional — the main difference between the two products is the inclusion of stored procedures and source code for a MS Outlook 2003/2007 plug-in in the Professional edition.

== History ==
SplendidCRM, Inc. was founded in November 2005 by Paul Rony. The project began as an experiment to test the effectiveness of the Microsoft .NET development environment at porting an application from the LAMP software bundle to the Microsoft ASP.NET framework. It was soon noted that there were few initiatives at the time dedicated to promoting Open Source and ASP.NET from a CRM perspective and SplendidCRM rapidly gained a following in the .NET developer community. It is a featured community project on the official ASP.NET website.

SplendidCRM adopted the LAMP based SugarCRM Open Source as the blueprint on which to initially model its ASP.NET application. The application is compatible with and uses SugarCRM assets such as icons and terminology packs. However the actual source code that makes up the application is completely original. SplendidCRM complies with the terms of the Sugar Public License 1.1.3. SplendidCRM first appeared on Codeplex on 28 June 2006 and has been downloaded in excess of 4000 times, however this does not include the volume of downloads directly from the SplendidCRM corporate website. SplendidCRM is based on but is not a competitor of SugarCRM. SplendidCRM targets the Microsoft-centric small business sector where Microsoft CRM is too expensive and complex to implement. SplendidCRM may be taking on Microsoft CRM with Microsoft's own tools.

== Product ==
SplendidCRM is an open-source customer relationship management application built on the Microsoft .NET framework. The product can be deployed in a variety of scenarios including Software-as-a-service.

== Licensing ==
SplendidCRM is one of the new breed of Microsoft-based open-source projects. It is unusual because at present it features a developer based licensing model for its professional edition, which means that system integrators wishing to adopt SplendidCRM only need to pay for the number of software developers working on their project — rather than the number of ultimate end users. However, companies that adopt SplendidCRM for internal use must adhere to the per-user fee for all their users.

SugarCRM has now been released under the GNU Affero General Public License version 3, although when the port was made, SugarCRM was licensed under its own Sugar Public License 1.1.3 (SPL). Following criticism from the Open Source Initiative SugarCRM decided to adopt the AGPLv3 to license its community edition (open source) product on July 25, 2007. The SPL is a license that was derived from the Mozilla Public License, and as such is a file-based license; the move to AGPLv3 by SugarCRM is seen to be a positive step by their developer community, and consequently also benefits the developers of ported solutions such as SplendidCRM.

SplendidCRM complied with the SPL, and was only able to sell a Professional Version because the Database Views and Stored Procedures (SPs) were developed completely independently of SugarCRM. These are not available in the current Open Source version of SplendidCRM. The move by SugarCRM to AGPLv3 means that once SplendidCRM has also moved to AGPLv3, ASP.NET developers will be able to use SplendidCRM as a framework for developing their own products and solutions without the restrictions previously experienced under the SPL.

== See also ==
- SugarCRM
- Web application
