= Pipedrive =

Company based in Estonia and USA

- Website type: Private
- Founded: 2010, Tallinn, Estonia
- Headquarters: New York City, United States
- Owner: Vista Equity Partners (majority stake)
- Founders: Timo Rein; Urmas Purde; Ragnar Sass; Martin Henk; Martin Tajur
- Key people: Paulo Cunha (CEO)
- Industry: Software as a Service; Cloud computing
- Services: Sales management Customer relationship management Lead generation and management Marketing automation
- Employees: 1,000 (2025)
- Website: www.pipedrive.com

Pipedrive is a private, cloud-based customer relationship management (CRM) software company founded in Estonia in 2010 and headquartered in New York City. The company develops the Pipedrive sales CRM application for web and mobile devices.

In 2020, Pipedrive agreed to a transaction in which Vista Equity Partners took a majority stake; reporting at the time valued the company at about US$1.5 billion.

== History ==
Pipedrive was founded in 2010 in Tallinn, Estonia. In 2011, the company participated in the AngelPad accelerator program.

The company raised venture funding in multiple rounds during the 2010s, including a reported US$2.4 million round in 2013, a US$9 million Series A round in 2015 led by Bessemer Venture Partners, a US$17 million Series B round in 2017 led by Atomico, and a US$50 million Series C round in 2018 led by Insight Partners and Bessemer Venture Partners.

In 2025, ITPro reported that Pipedrive expanded its executive team as part of a strategy focused on AI-driven product development, with Paulo Cunha as chief executive officer.

== Product ==
Pipedrive is a sales-focused CRM centered on pipeline and deal management, with features such as automation and reporting tools. Reviews have described its ecosystem of integrations, including connectivity through its marketplace and services such as Zapier.

== See also ==
- Comparison of CRM systems
- Comparison of Mobile CRM systems
