= Alan Trefler =

American businessman (born 1956)

Alan N. Trefler
- Born: March 10, 1956 (age 70); Boston, Massachusetts, U.S.
- Education: Dartmouth College
- Occupation: Business executive
- Years active: 1977–present
- Employer(s): Pegasystems (CEO, founder)
- Board member of: Pegasystems
- Awards: Stevie Award – Software CEO of the Year (2009)
- Website: www.pega.com/about/leadership/alan-trefler

Alan N. Trefler (born March 10, 1956) is an American billionaire businessman and chess master best known as the chief executive officer (CEO) of Pegasystems, a multinational software company he founded in 1983. Prior to Pegasystems, in 1975 Trefler tied for first place in the World Open Chess Championship with grandmaster Pal Benko, afterwards working as a software engineer for Casher Associates and TMI Systems. Founding Pegasystems at the age of 27, he took the company Public in 1996, with Trefler remaining clerk and president until 1999 and afterwards becoming CEO. With a 52 percent ownership stake in Pegasystems, his net worth surpassed $1 billion in 2013 and in March 2017 he appeared on the Forbes Billionaire's List for the first time. In 2014 he authored the book Build for Change, which addresses changing consumer markets. Involved in philanthropy, in 1997 he established the Trefler Foundation.

== Early life and education ==
Alan Trefler was born to a Jewish family in 1956 in Boston, Massachusetts, the son of Dorothy (née Pugatch) and Eric Trefler. Trefler was raised in Brookline, Massachusetts with his brother Leon. His mother, a daughter of immigrants from Eastern Europe, worked as a schoolteacher. His father, a Holocaust survivor who came to the United States from Poland after World War II, owned and operated Trefler's, a restorer of art and furniture. This business is still family owned and operating as of 2021. Working at his family's store while young and starting to play chess around the age of seven, Trefler would later become high school chess champion of Massachusetts and win various regional competitions. He graduated from Brookline High School in 1973. Trefler went on to Dartmouth College, where he studied economics and computer science and remained active in chess. At the age of 19, in 1975 he tied for first place in the World Open Chess Championship in New York with grandmaster Pal Benko. Also at Dartmouth, he was the winner of the John G. Kemeny prize in computing. He graduated with a BS in 1977.

== Business career ==
=== Software engineering ===
Although he attained the level of chess master and considered going professional, after Trefler graduated from Dartmouth he moved into software engineering instead. In the early 1980s he developed computer systems that could play chess, later applying the same business techniques to teaching computers how to process business rules. Between 1978 and 1980 Trefler was a senior project manager for Casher Associates Inc., a business process management company in Chestnut Hill, Massachusetts. He then worked at TMI Systems, where he led the development of their funds transfer product from 1980 to 1983.

=== Founder of Pegasystems ===
He founded Pegasystems in April 1983, taking on the roles of CEO and chairman at the age of 27. Expressing frustration with the "primitive" computer systems available for companies such as banks and insurance companies, he states that "when I started Pega, it was with the vision that we could create a set of metaphors –an intermediate visual language that would enable business people to more directly instruct the machine... [and] get the computer to really understand how business people wanted things to work.... And it turns out to be a fairly hard problem to solve." Basing the company in Cambridge, Massachusetts with Citibank as his first client, during the company's early years Trefler focused on providing case management for companies such as American Express.

The company went public in 1996 on NASDAQ. Inventing a number of patents for use in Pegasystems' software architecture, in 1998 Trefler was granted a United States patent for Pegasystems' distinctive rules-based architecture, which provides the framework for Pegasystems' business process management (BPM) solutions. Trefler remained clerk of Pegasystems Inc. until June 1999, and president until October 1999. He remained CEO and chairman of the company's board of directors.

=== Recent work at Pegasystems ===
In 2009 Trefler won the Stevie Award for Computer Software CEO of the Year at the American Business Awards. In March 2010, Pegasystems acquired Chordiant for around $161.5 million, which gave Pegasystems access to new markets such as telecommunications and healthcare. The Massachusetts Technology Leadership Council named him their Public Company CEO of the Year in 2011. With a 52 percent ownership stake in Pegasystems, his net worth surpassed $1 billion on November 25, 2013. His Pegasystems salary was $751,526 in 2014. That year, Business Insider ranked him the eighth lowest paid CEO in the tech industry.

In 2014 he authored and published Build for Change, a book focused on the management of customers and business processes. A Forbes contributor related that the book made "a convincing argument" that companies needed to prepare for changes in customer behavior, or face negative repercussions.

Pegasystems had 3,000 employees, 30 offices, and "more than half a billion dollars in revenue" by early 2015. In 2015, courts ruled in Trefler's and Pegasystems' favor in a copyright infringement suit filed by YYZ, a company the press described as a patent troll. Trefler has been recognized by the Babson College Academy of Distinguished Entrepreneurs, and he speaks publicly on business and software topics at various events and conferences. Among other publications, he has appeared in Barron's, the BBC, Forbes, Fortune, The New York Times, The Wall Street Journal, Reuters, and Bloomberg Television. Trefler made the Forbes Billionaire's List in March 2017.

== Chess career ==
A master-level chess player who had been playing chess since his childhood, Trefler competed in the 1975 World Open Chess Championship in New York City. Still a college student at Dartmouth, he entered the tournament with a 2075 Elo rating, 125 points below the lowest master-rated player, ranking him 115th overall in the tournament. He went on to be crowned co-champion along with International Grandmaster Pal Benko, who was rated at 2504. Trefler also placed ahead of Grandmasters such as Walter Browne and Nicolas Rossolimo, as well as future Grandmaster Michael Rohde. Trefler competed in a charity chess tournament in 2010 alongside grandmasters such as Garry Kasparov and Boaz Weinstein.

== Philanthropy ==
Trefler and his wife donated $1 million to Dorchester High School in Dorchester, Boston in 1995. They established The Trefler Foundation in 1997, which seeks to improve urban public education in the Boston area. The Treflers were early supporters of the nonprofit Year Up, and in 2015 they founded Union & Fifth, where proceeds raised from donated clothes benefit various charities.

== Personal life ==
Trefler married his wife Pamela Reinhard in 1992, who at the time was working as an investment banker. The couple reside in Brookline, Massachusetts.

== Publishing history ==
- Trefler, Alan (June 3, 2014). Build for Change. Wiley. ISBN 978-1118930267.
