= Axcel =

Nordic private equity firm

Axcel is a private equity firm, headquartered in Copenhagen, Denmark and first founded in 1994. As of 2026, the firm owns 28 companies and has made 82 acquisitions. The firm's investments span across the technology, industry, healthcare, and consumer products sector.

== History ==
Axcel closed its sixth fund, Axcel VI, at EUR 807 million in 2021, followed by Axcel VII at EUR 1.3 billion in 2024.In November 2025, it closed Axcel Elevate I, a fund targeting smaller Nordic companies, at EUR 459 million. Its eighth mid-market fund, Axcel VIII, closed at EUR 2.1 billion in September 2026. According to the firm, this brought its total capital raised across ten funds to more than EUR 6.9 billion.

Axcel opened an office in Frankfurt in November 2024, expanding its presence beyond the Nordic countries. In February 2026, Christian Bamberger Bro succeeded Christian Schmidt-Jacobsen as managing partner. Schmidt-Jacobsen remained a partner and head of the Axcel Elevate strategy.

== Acquisitions ==
=== Industry ===
- Currentum - 2020 - Technical installation of building services
- Edda Group - 2021 - Staffing & Recruitment
- DANX Carousel Group - 2022 - In-night logistics
- XPartners - 2023 - Engineering consultancy
- Elcor - 2023 - Design & installation of electrical control panels
- Accru Partners - 2024 - Alliance of firms in accounting, tax, audit & advisory
- Acurum Group - 2024 - Property inspection, testing, maintenance and incident management
- Nordic Tyre Group - 2025 - Tyre distribution
- AGRD Partners - 2025 - Business law services

=== Technology ===
- Phase One - 2019 - Digital photography equipment
- Capture One - 2019 - Photo editing software developed by Phase One, spun into separate company following Axcel acquisition
- SuperOffice - 2020 - Customer Relationship Management (CRM) software
- emagine - 2021 - pan-European business & IT consultancy
- Init - 2022 - Industrial IT & automation
- BullWall - 2022 - Cybersecurity, Ransomware containment
- itm8 - 2022 - IT Services
- NTI Group - 2022 - Digital services supplier
- Progrits - 2022 - Information services & logistics software
- Bekk Consulting - 2025 - Consultancy
- LS Retail - 2025 - Retail and hospitality software
- KapitalKontroll - 2026 - Debt collection software
- Geomatikk Group - 2026 - Software and services for protecting underground infrastructure

=== Healthcare ===
- Vetopia - 2021 - Veterinary medicine, clinic chain
- Oral Care - 2022 - Dentistry, clinic chain
- Sanviva - 2026 - Supply chain and logistics for medical devices
- Sangro - 2026 - Supply chain and logistics for homecare products

=== Consumer ===
- GUBI - 2018 - Interior design house
- The Nutriment Company - 2022 - Pet food
