= Really Simple Systems =

British customer relationship management company

Spotler CRM (formerly: Really Simple Systems Ltd)
- Company type: Ltd
- Industry: Software
- Founded: 2004
- Headquarters: Petersfield, United Kingdom
- Number of locations: 2
- Key people: Lee Chadwick (CEO)
- Products: CRM software
- Website: spotlercrm.com

Spotler CRM (formerly: Really Simple Systems Ltd) is a Cloud CRM provider, offering CRM systems to small and medium sized companies.

== Overview ==
Spotler CRM has over 18,000 users of its hosted customer relationship management systems. Customers include the Royal Academy, the Red Cross, the NHS and IBM as well as thousands of small and medium sized companies. The company is headquartered in the United Kingdom with an office in Australia.

The CRM system includes integrations with various other apps including Zapier, Microsoft 365, Xero (company), Sage Business Cloud.

== Awards ==
The company has won the Software Satisfaction Awards for the best small business CRM system twice, in 2008 and 2010. In 2011, the company won the EuroCloud Award and the Database Marketing Award. In 2014, it won Best Cloud Application at the annual EuroCloud Awards and was a finalist at CRM Idol. In November 2017, PC Mag listed Spotler CRM in Best Lead Management Software article. In 2018, the company was a finalist in the Small Business Awards for Business Innovation and the DevOps Excellence Awards 2019. More recently, in October 2019, Spotler CRM won the Computing (magazine) Cloud Management Solution of the Year 2019 Award. In 2020, the company was nominated as a finalist in the Cloud Computing Awards 2020 for the Best CRM Solution of the Year, the European IT & Software Excellence Awards 2020 for the SME (Cloud or SaaS) Solution of the Year, and the SME National Business Awards for Best Customer Service.

== History ==
Spotler CRM was founded in 2004 by John Paterson, former CEO of Zeus Technology and COO of Systems Union, with the public launch in January 2006. In October 2006, the company's Marketing module was launched, initially offering Campaign Management. Email marketing was added in August 2012.

In October 2010, the company launched its Free CRM plan, a Freemium two user hosted CRM system. The existing product was renamed Enterprise Edition.

In May 2013, the company was accredited for entry in the UK Government's GCloud CloudStore catalogue.

In July 2013 Really Simple Systems launched a cross-platform version of its CRM, running seamlessly on desktops, laptops, tablets and smartphones.

Version 5, launched in March 2017, offered a new user interface, custom dashboards, help drawers and grid customisation.

In September 2017, the company announced its compliance with the European Union's General Data Protection Regulation (GDPR) and its phased roll-out of GDPR compliance features in it email marketing module.

In February 2018, it launched a set of GDPR compliance tools allowing users of its email marketing module to collect consent to digital marketing communications.

In October 2020, launched a new version of its email marketing tool for SMEs. Followed by the Advanced Marketing tool in February 2021.

In September 2021, the company launched a CRM customisation service enabling extensive modification to the standard CRM product to meet customer demand.

In October 2021, Really Simple Systems added a new level of customer service by providing free one-to-one technical support for new and existing customers.

== Location ==
The company is headquartered in Petersfield, Hampshire in the United Kingdom. In January 2008 the company opened its first overseas office in Sydney, Australia.

== Modules ==
The product consists of three modules:

- Sales
- Marketing
- Help desk software

== Technical information ==
Spotler CRM is delivered as a software as a service application. As from Version 5 the product is written using the LAMP stack. Version 4 and previous versions used Microsoft technology. Some JavaScript is used on the client.

== See also ==
- Comparison of CRM systems
