= Capsule (CRM) =

Customer relationship management software

- Industry: Software as a Service
- Founded: 2009
- Founder: Duncan Stockdill; Phillip Haines; Wendy Rule
- Headquarters: Manchester
- Key people: Steve Ledgerwood (CEO)
- Services: Sales management Customer relationship management Cloud computing
- Number of employees: 32
- Website: https://capsulecrm.com

Capsule is a customer relationship management (CRM) software-as-a-service web application and mobile app developed by Zestia, a privately held software company that operates globally and was founded in 2009.

== History ==
Capsule was released in 2009 originally under the name Javelin, before being renamed to Capsule in 2010.

In 2011, Capsule launched an integration with G Suite Marketplace.

In 2013, Capsule released Capsule for Mobile on the App Store and Play Store.

In 2018, Capsule released a Teams plan. The primary functions of the Teams plan are for businesses to assign responsibility for contacts, control access to data, and report on team performance.

== Recognition ==
- Winner – Best Entrepreneurial Tech Company in 2011 – Northern Tech Awards.
- Shortlisted – Best CRM for SMB – TechRadar Pro Best for Business Awards 2017
- Winner – Best CRM Solution – TechRadar Pro Best for Business Awards 2019: Best business software-as-a-service

== See also ==
- Comparison of CRM systems
- Comparison of mobile CRM systems
