= SugarCRM =

American software company

SugarAI Inc.
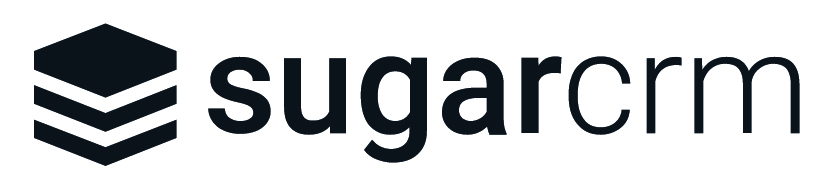
- Type: Private
- Industry: CRM Software
- Founded: California 2004
- Founder: Clint Oram, John Roberts, Jacob Taylor
- Headquarters: San Francisco, California
- Key people: David T. Roberts (CEO) Avner Alkhas (CFO) Becca Toth (CMO) Bob Hackney (CTO)
- Products: Sugar Sell; Sugar Market; Sugar Serve
- Number of employees: 600+
- Website: www.sugarai.com

SugarAI is a software company based in Denver, Colorado. It produces the on-premises and cloud-based web application Sugar, a customer relationship management (CRM) system.

SugarAI's functionality includes sales-force automation, marketing campaigns, customer support, collaboration, Mobile CRM, Social CRM and reporting.

The company operates a number of websites, including its commercial website Sugarai.com and an online user forum called SugarClub.

In February 2014, in a blog post that provoked a strong reaction from the development community, SugarCRM announced that they would no longer be releasing new open-source versions of their Community Edition application; from now on this would be a bug-fix-only application.

== History ==
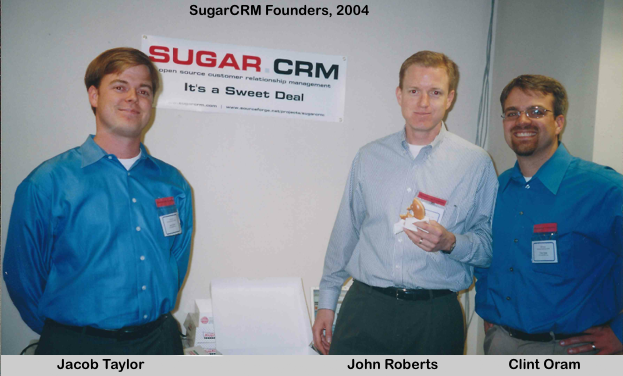
From left to right, Jacob Taylor, John Roberts and Clint Oram in 2004

John Roberts conceived of the idea and name of SugarCRM while riding his mountain bike named Sugar in the Santa Cruz Mountains. Clint Oram, John Roberts, and Jacob Taylor started full-time work on the SugarCRM open source project in April 2004, and incorporated the company in California in June 2004. Roberts served as the CEO from 2004 to 2009, Oram was the vice president, and Taylor was the CTO & vice president of engineering.

In June 2004, Josh B. Stein of DFJ invested $2 million into the startup and became a board member. With the help of this investment, Sugar expanded quickly and by September 2004, potential users had downloaded 25,000 copies of the application, then named Sugar Open Source. In October 2004, the company was named "Project of the Month" on SourceForge.

The popularity of this project allowed the company to raise $86 million of venture capital from Draper Fisher Jurvetson, Walden International, New Enterprise Associates and Goldman Sachs.

In 2006, SugarCRM launched SugarCon, a conference for Sugar customers, users and developers. It has since become an annual conference, held in the San Francisco Bay Area to begin with but in 2018 the conference was moved to Las Vegas.

By 2008, SugarCRM employed over 150 people.

In June 2008, co-founder Taylor left the company, during what technology website The Register called "a mysterious exodus of senior and experienced business staff" from SugarCRM. Clint Oram replaced him as the CTO.

In May 2009, co-founder and CEO Roberts left the company. He was replaced as CEO by SugarCRM board member Larry Augustin, who had previously founded and served as the CEO of VA Linux (now known as Geeknet).

In June 2010, Sugar launched Sugar 6, a major upgrade emphasizing ease of use and introducing a complete UI overhaul of Sugar Professional and Sugar Enterprise.

In June 2017, SugarCRM released SugarCRM Hint, a new product which searches the web for additional information on users in SugarCRM.

Private equity firm Accel-KKR became a single investor in August 2018, describing the investment as being "nine figures".

In May 2024, SugarCRM acquired the company sales-i, a revenue intelligence solution provider.

In April 2026, SugarCRM Unveils New Brand Identity as SugarAI, Declaring the Next Generation of CRM

== Editions ==
SugarCRM sells CRM software in on-premises and Cloud variants:

Sales force automation includes:

- Sugar Sell (available in Essentials, Advanced, and Premier editions)
- Sugar Enterprise on-premises (available in Enterprise and Enterprise+ editions)

Sugar Market (marketing automation) and Sugar Serve (customer service software) are also offered, along with several additional optional capabilities.

=== Community edition ===
SugarCRM provided a community edition, Sugar CE, previously known as Sugar Open Source. It was available free of charge alongside paid editions until version 6.5.

In 2013, Sugar version 7 was announced but was only released in Sugar's hosted paid environment. No update to the community edition was announced with it. SugarCRM's community support team have stated that 7.0 will not be available in a community edition, and that no release date for an updated community edition was known. After that SugarCRM released a notice saying that they "have no plans" to release 7 to Open Source.

In April 2018, Clint Oram, CMO & Founder of SugarCRM, Inc., posted to the company's community blog that the Community Edition open source project had officially ended.

=== Deployment options ===
Sugar is a software as a service (SaaS) product. As of Sugar 7, customers can opt to use an on-premises product, SugarCRM's Sugar Cloud, one of SugarCRM's partners, or public cloud services (such as Amazon Web Services, Microsoft Azure, Rackspace Cloud or IBM SmartCloud).

== License ==
SugarCRM initially licensed Sugar Open Source under the SugarCRM Public License (based on the Mozilla Public License and the Attribution Assurance License). While users could freely redistribute Sugar and the license allowed for the inspection and modification of the source code and for the creation of derived works, critics, including Dan Farber, editor in chief at CNET, expressed some concern over SugarCRM's use of the term "commercial open source" to describe its products.

On July 25, 2007, SugarCRM announced the adoption of the GNU General Public License (version 3) for Sugar Community Edition, the offering previously known as Sugar Open Source. This license took effect with the release of Sugar Community Edition 5.0.

On April 11, 2010, SugarCRM announced that starting with version 6.0.0, the Sugar Community Edition would be licensed under the GNU Affero General Public License version 3. The charts module, customer portal, mobile support, some SOAP functions and most of the default theme templates were removed from the AGPLv3 licensed Sugar Community Edition 6.

In 2014 the project announced there would only be proprietary licenses starting at Sugar 7.

In 2020, a statement SugarCRM updated is license management support for it licensed products and could be found on SugarCRMs website.

== Open source forks of community edition ==
- Vtiger CRM, 2004 fork of V1.0 of SugarCRM
- SarvCRM, 2012 fork of Community Edition 5.5.4
- SuiteCRM, 2013 fork of SugarCRM Community Edition 6.5
- SpiceCRM, 2016 fork of SugarCRM Community Edition adding an Angular-based UI leveraging Lightning Design from Salesforce

== See also ==
- Comparison of CRM systems
- Customer relationship management
- Odoo, open source CRM
- SplendidCRM was inspired by SugarCRM but developed using Microsoft technology stack (C#, ASP.NET, SQL Server).
- List of free and open source software packages
