= Snapforce CRM =

Snapforce
- Type: Private
- Industry: Software as a Service
- Founded: 2013; 13 years ago
- Founder: Richard Gabriel
- Headquarters: Mahwah, New Jersey, USA
- Services: Sales management Customer relationship management Cloud computing solutions
- Website: www.snapforce.com

Snapforce CRM is a comprehensive customer relationship management (CRM) SaaS application, developed by Snapforce.com.

== Overview ==
Primary use case is customer management and sales automation, although it can also be configured with telephony support.

Additional software components include customer databases, customer interaction tracking, reporting, and workflow automation.

== Deployment options ==
Snapforce CRM can be configured to handle inbound and outbound calling, calls are logged to the prospect or customer record automatically in real time.

== Recognition ==
In May 2014 the company became the first crm software provider to offer telephony services as a native feature.

Snapforce CRM was recognized as one of ten "Top Players" in the Customer Relationship Management Market Report 2015.
