= SuperOffice =

European computer software company

SuperOffice AS
- Type: Private company
- Industry: Computer software
- Founded: 1990 in Oslo, Norway; 35 years ago
- Founder: Une Amundsen
- Headquarters: Oslo, Norway
- Key people: Bjørn Røsten (CEO), Ole Erlend Vormeland (CFO), Thomas Rødseth (CPTO), Camilla Heidenreich Bommen (CCO), Bettina Isabelle Berntsen (CMO), Erlend Mohus (Chief Strategy & Acquisition Officer), Jessica Hartenberger (Head of People), Julija Ražanskienė (MD, SuperOffice UAB)
- Products: CRM
- Number of employees: ~300 (2026)
- Website: www.superoffice.com

SuperOffice is a European business-to-business software company that develops customer relationship management (CRM) solutions. Founded in Oslo, Norway, in 1989 by Une Amundsen, the company provides cloud-based software-as-a-service (SaaS) and on-premises platforms for sales, marketing, customer service, as well as integrations with enterprise resource planning (ERP) systems, mobile applications and artificial intelligence features. As of April 2026, the company is led by CEO Bjørn Røsten.

SuperOffice delivers its products through subsidiaries, distributors and resellers in Norway, Sweden, Denmark, Germany, and the Netherlands. The German office covers the DACH region (Germany, Austria, Switzerland while the Dutch office serves the Benelux countries (Belgium, the Netherlands, and Luxembourg). The Company also operates through partners in the United Kingdom, Ireland, and North America.

SuperOffice has been owned by the Danish investment firm Axcel since 2020.

== History ==
SuperOffice was founded in Oslo, Norway, in 1989 by Une Amundsen to develop CRM software for sales organizations.

In its early years, founder Amundsen internally referred to the company as "Superland". The name was used informally within the organization, accompanied by symbolic elements such as a written constitution and company 'passports,' which remain part of the company's internal culture. Under Amundsen's leadership, the company grew steadily and, in 1997, was listed on the Oslo Stock Exchange under the ticker symbol SUO, where it remained until 2009.

In 2017, founder Une Amundsen passed away. Three years later, in April 2020, SuperOffice was acquired by the Danish investment firm Axcel. That same year, in September, SuperOffice expanded its European footprint with the acquisition of the Dutch software company Infobridge.

In 2024, SuperOffice appointed Lars Engbork as CEO, bringing leadership experience from Visma, e-conomic, Oracle, and SimCorp. The company also hired Thomas Rødseth as Chief Product and Technology Officer and Bettina Isabelle Berntsen as Chief Marketing Officer.

In June 2025, SuperOffice announced that Axcel had established a €266 million continuation fund, led by Carlyle AlpInvest, to extend its ownership and accelerate growth. The investment was aimed at expanding AI capabilities, pursuing strategic acquisitions, and strengthening the company’s market position across Europe.

Following the 2020 acquisition, Axcel reported that SuperOffice experienced growth in its cloud-based revenue.

In April 2026, Bjørn Røsten was appointed Chief Executive Officer of SuperOffice, succeeding Lars Engbork, who stepped down to take a CEO role at another international company.

== Acquisitions ==
On 27 August 2025, SuperOffice announced the acquisition of Swedish software company i-Centrum AB, a long-standing partner in its ecosystem. i-Centrum develops CRM-related modules and app integrations, including solutions for field service operations, quote management, booking systems, and contract management. The deal marked the first strategic move following Axcel’s renewed investment in June 2025.

On 3 June 2025, SuperOffice secures significant backing from Axcel via a €266 million continuation fund, led by Carlyle AlpInvest, to accelerate European growth, expand AI capabilities, and pursue strategic acquisitions.

On 14 April 2020, SuperOffice announced its acquisition by Danish investment firm Axcel.

On 14 September 2020, SuperOffice acquired the Dutch software company Infobridge.

== Services ==
=== Software ===
SuperOffice provides customer relationship management (CRM) software delivered as a cloud-based (SaaS). The system includes modules for sales, marketing, and customer service, with options for ERP integration, additional apps, and industry-specific solutions.

=== Consulting ===
In addition to its software platforms, the company offers consulting services such as implementation, system integration, training, and user support.

=== Artificial intelligence ===
In January 2025, SuperOffice launched SuperOffice Copilot, an artificial intelligence assistant integrated into its customer relationship management (CRM) platform. The tool includes features such as drafting emails, creating follow-up tasks, and summarizing customer interactions.

The system is developed and maintained in-house, with an emphasis on compliance with the General Data Protection Regulation (GDPR).

== Operations ==
=== Office locations ===
SuperOffice is headquartered in Oslo, Norway, with additional offices in Sweden, Denmark, Germany, the Netherlands, and Lithuania. The German office covers the DACH region (Germany, Austria, and Switzerland), while the Dutch office serves the Benelux countries (Belgium, Netherlands, Luxembourg). The company also works through partner representation in the United Kingdom, Ireland, and North America.

=== Corporate culture ===
SuperOffice’s stated corporate values include Be true, Stay sustainable, Put people first, Utfordre, and Keep it simple.

== Leadership ==
As of 2026, SuperOffice is led by CEO Bjørn Røsten, who joined the company in 2026. Prior to joining SuperOffice, Røsten served as CEO of Semine. The executive team also includes Ole Erlend Vormeland (Chief Financial Officer), Thomas Rødseth (Chief Product & Technology Officer), Camilla Heidenreich Bommen (Chief Commercial Officer), Bettina Isabelle Berntsen (Chief Marketing Officer), Erlend Mohus (Chief Strategy & Acquisition Officer), Jessica Hartenberger (Head of People), and Julija Ražanskienė (Managing Director of SuperOffice UAB in Lithuania).

== Conferences ==
SuperOffice hosts an annual customer and partner conference called CHANGE, considered the company’s flagship event across its European markets. The event covers topics related to digital transformation, customer relationship management (CRM) industry trends, and product developments. It is attended by business leaders, customers, partners, and industry experts from across Europe.

The program typically includes keynote sessions, product demonstrations, training workshops, and networking opportunities. Recent events have focused on themes such as artificial intelligence, automation, and balancing innovation with customer relationships.

The conference has been held in cities across Europe, including Oslo, Stockholm, Utrecht, and Copenhagen. Speakers have included SuperOffice executives, customers, partners, and external representatives from the technology and business sectors.

== Design Awards ==
SuperOffice CRM 5 was recognized with the Norwegian Design Council's Award for Design Excellence in 2002.
