= Pivotal CRM =

Aptean CRM, formerly Pivotal CRM, is a customer relationship management (CRM) software system offered by Avolin, an enterprise software and service company headquartered in Austin Texas. Pivotal CRM includes software tools for sales force automation (SFA), marketing automation and lead management, and customer service automation, as well as partner management, mobile CRM, analytics and call scripting. Industry specific versions of the Pivotal CRM suite are also offered for several industries, including institutional asset management, mutual fund wholesaling, capital markets, commercial banking, private banking, home building and real estate, healthcare, and legal services, among others. Built on .NET Framework, Pivotal CRM embeds several commonly used Microsoft business products within the CRM system, including Microsoft Office, Microsoft Outlook, Microsoft SharePoint, and Microsoft Visual Studio.

== History ==
Pivotal Software was founded by Norm Francis and Keith Wales in 1994. Francis and Wales were a co-founders of Basic Software Group (BSG) the company that developed ACCPAC, an accounting software package which was purchased by Computer Associates in 1985. Francis and director of marketing Sharka Chobot Stuyt promoted the term "360-degree" customer relationship management (CRM). The company released its Pivotal Relationship Version 1, in April 1996.

The company changed its name to Pivotal Corporation in June 1999 to reflect broadening beyond just software into professional services, content, and online services. Pivotal Corporation went public in August 1999 and its shares were listed on the NASDAQ exchange under the symbol PVTL.

In February 2000, Pivotal was promoted by Microsoft's Bill Gates, to showcase Pivotal software at the premiere of Microsoft Windows 2000. Then called Pivotal eRelationship, it was the first eBusiness relationship management (eBRM) software to be certified for Windows 2000.

Pivotal Corporation was acquired by chinadotcom, renamed CDC Corporation, in February 2004. The acquisition added 1,700 customers, as well as marketing, sales, service, and partner management capabilities to CDC Software’s business unit focused on front-office solutions for mid-sized enterprises.

In 2012, CDC Software merged with Consona Corporation, to form Aptean.

In October 2018, ESW Capital completed the acquisition of the Aptean's Vertical Business Applications Group. The group will join ESW Capital under the newly formed Avolin portfolio of companies, Avolin will continue to operate enterprise software solutions across Customer Relationship Management, Knowledge Management, IT Support and Supply Chain Management.

Pivotal CRM version 6 was released in July 2008. Based on .NET Framework technology, It provided task-based navigation, embedded including Microsoft Office, Microsoft Outlook, Microsoft SharePoint, and a client user interface. The product embeds commonly used Microsoft business products within the CRM system, including Microsoft Office, Microsoft Outlook, Microsoft SharePoint, and Microsoft Visual Studio. As such, it is an example of an Office Business Application.

While historically Pivotal CRM is primarily implemented as software product running on customer premises, it was later marketed as software as a service, on Microsoft Azure and Amazon Web Services.

== Criticisms ==
Early versions of Pivotal CRM employed a proprietary scripting language and development environment, called Pivotal Agents. At the time, Pivotal agents were suitable for customers who did not need programming experience to build and manage business logic in Pivotal, although the development tools were graphical & not always welcomed by developers who preferred to see lines of code on the screen.

Pivotal agents were no longer being required in the Pivotal 6.0 platform which was released in 2008, and were replaced by .Net, C# programming infrastructure that allowed common Microsoft developers to be proficient in Pivotal customization. Customers who purchased Pivotal after 2008 implemented the product on the new .Net architecture and no longer required the use of Pivotal agents to build business logic.

Since 2008, Pivotal has released a multitude of tools the assist customers on previous versions to upgrade their business logic into the new .Net architecture. Some of these included an agent conversion tool which automatically converted Pivotal agents to C# code, the ability to run the rich client on the Pivotal 6.x platform, and the ability to run the Windows Access (WA) client on the 6.x platform is coming in Q1 2014.
