= LendKey =

Online lending platform

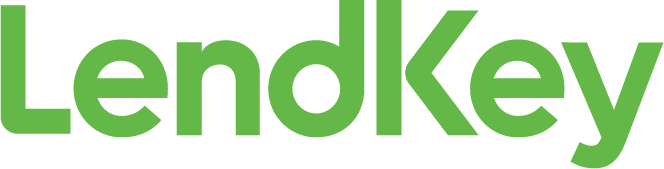
- Company type: Private
- Industry: Personal finance Platform as a Service; Software
- Founded: October 2007; 18 years ago (as Fynanz Inc.)
- Founders: Vince Passione; Michael Stallmeyer; Anoop Thyagarajan
- Headquarters: New York City, New York, U.S. Branch in Cincinnati, U.S.
- Area served: United States
- Key people: Vince Passione (CEO / Co-Founder); Michael Stallmeyer (COO / Co-Founder); Anoop Thyagarajan (SVP Infrastructure / Co-Founder)
- Products: Private Student Loans; Student Loan Refinancing; Green Loans; Home Improvement Loans
- Website: www.lendkey.com

LendKey (formerly Fynanz Inc.) is a lending platform and online marketplace that allows consumers to apply for and receive private student loans, student loan refinancing and home improvement loans from their local credit unions and community banks. LendKey's cloud-based tools and infrastructure enable the nation's 13,000+ community financial institutions to enter online lending and offer loans for various asset classes.

== Overview ==
LendKey was founded by Vince Passione in 2007 and was originally called Fynanz. As Fynanz, the company operated as a peer-to-peer loan platform for student loans, and distinguished itself from other P2P lenders by guaranteeing loans, and by using new data sources to assess the creditworthiness of applicants. In 2013 the company rebranded as LendKey, and took its lending platform to credit unions and community banks.

In January 2010, LendKey received $9.5 million in venture funding during its Series A financing round. Subsequently, the company secured another $12.5 million in venture funding in August 2013, bringing the total capital raised to $22 million. Series B funding was led by investors Updata Partners and TTV Capita and existing investors Draper Fisher Jurvetson and Gotham Ventures.

The company launched Aliro in 2021, a private marketplace that allows financial institutions to buy and sell loans.
