= Pegasystems =

American software company

Pegasystems Inc.
- Type: Public
- Traded as: Nasdaq: PEGA; S&P 400 component
- Industry: Information technology
- Founded: 1983; 43 years ago
- Founders: Alan Trefler
- Headquarters: Waltham, Massachusetts, U.S.
- Number of locations: 40 (2026)
- Key people: Alan Trefler (CEO)
- Products: Low-code development platform; Customer relationship management tools; Business process management tools
- Revenue: ▲US$1.58 billion (2025)
- Operating income: ▲US$0.245 billion (2025)
- Net income: ▲US$0.186 billion (2025)
- Total assets: ▲US$1.65 billion (2025)
- Total equity: ▲US$684.08 million (2025)
- Number of employees: 5,472 (2025)
- Website: www.pega.com

Pegasystems Inc. (Pega) is a global AI software company based in Waltham, Massachusetts, in the United States. The company has been publicly traded since 1996 as PEGA (NASDAQ). Pega is a low-code platform for workflow automation, business process management, and generative AI-powered decision-making for businesses.

== History ==
=== Early history ===
Alan Trefler founded Pegasystems in 1983 at the age of 27 in Cambridge, Massachusetts. Prior to founding the company, Trefler had developed computer systems that could play chess. During the company's early years, it focused on providing case management, namely for companies such as American Express. The company went public in 1996 with initial and secondary public offerings, and began trading on NASDAQ under the symbol PEGA.

=== 2010–2019 ===
In March 2010, Pegasystems acquired the enterprise software company Chordiant for around $161.5 million. The acquisition expanded Pegasystems into online training, telecommunications, and healthcare, integrating Chordiant’s CRM technology into its operations. Pega Cloud was introduced using Amazon Web Services in 2012, and in October 2013, Pegasystems acquired the mobile application developer (based in Kraków and Bangalore) Antenna Software for $27.7 million.

In 2014, Pegasystems invested in network operations in North America and India to support its cloud services. In that same year, Pegasystems acquired MeshLabs, a Bangalore-based text mining startup, and Firefly, a co-browsing tool.

Between 2005 and 2015, Pegasystems had an average sales growth of 21% per year. In 2016, the company acquired OpenSpan Inc., an Atlanta-based company specializing in robotic process automation and workforce analytics software.

In 2019, Pegasystems purchased Infruid Labs, a business analytics and data visualization software company, as well as In The Chat, a digital messaging platform.

=== 2020–present ===
In April 2020, Pegasystems launched an application for financial institutions to manage emergency small business loan applications. Throughout 2020, Pegasystems helped clients, including the Bavarian government and the Commonwealth Bank of Australia, develop apps to manage issues that arose because of COVID-19.

In May 2020, Pegasystems sponsored a Dropkick Murphys benefit concert at Fenway Park, featuring a virtual appearance by Bruce Springsteen. The event raised over $700,000 for COVID relief and supported Habitat for Humanity, Feeding America, and the Boston Resiliency Fund.

In January 2021, the company acquired Qurious.io, a cloud service that analyzes voice calls in real time to support customer service representatives. This led to Pega’s Voice AI and Messaging AI that analyzes live customer service conversations in real time.

In 2021, Pegasystems moved its headquarters to Waltham, Massachusetts. The company became the official Ryder Cup supplier, and sponsored golfers Marc Leishman and Mel Reid, with Reid notably wearing the company’s Pride logo in competition.

In May 2022, a jury verdict awarded Appian Corporation $2.036 billion in damages for trade secret misappropriation and a damages award of $1 for a violation of the Virginia Computer Crimes Act. The company was not required to begin paying the judgment until all avenues of appeal were exhausted. In February 2023, Pega filed an appeal asking the court to overturn the previous judgment and either rule in Pega’s favor or order a new trial. In July 2024, the Court of Appeals of Virginia reversed the verdict and the multi-billion dollar damages award and ordered a new trial. On January 8, 2026, following an additional appeal, the Supreme Court of Virginia affirmed the Court of Appeals’ decision and ordered a new trial, stating that the circuit court made several legal and evidentiary errors during the jury trial. The case returned to the Fairfax Circuit Court.

In 2022, Pegasystems acquired Everflow, a Brazilian process mining company to support their process mining and hyper automation goals. Two years later, in 2024, Pega expanded its GenAI capabilities to integrate with Large Language Models (LLMs) from Amazon Web Services (AWS) and Google Cloud.

2026 marked 30 years since Pega’s IPO and company representatives rang the Opening Bell at Nasdaq. In January, the company acquired the core assets of Adopteq, and, later in the year, Pega was among the first software providers to earn ISO/IEC 42001:2023 certification for responsible AI management.

== Products and services ==
=== Pega Infinity ===
Pega Infinity adds AI, low-code, and automation features to Pega products, including Pega Cloud, Pega Platform, Pega Customer Decision Hub, Pega Customer Service, and Pega Sales Automation. The portfolio uses Constellation UX, a case management tool. Pega Infinity ‘25 was released in 2025 as the latest version of the Pega Infinity portfolio.

Pega Infinity ‘26 was announced in 2026 as a series of artificial intelligence updates focused on agentic AI capabilities, building governance and compliance directly into workflows, and predictable, outcome-based pricing. The company’s predictable AI architecture is a governance model that shifts most AI reasoning from running to design time. Once workflows are designed and deployed using heavy AI-based support, Pega moves to a “lighter weight semantic mode” of AI for execution. Pega expanded support for the Open Model Context Protocol (MCP), which allows companies to integrate third-party AI agents directly into Pega’s workflows, while maintaining adherence to enterprise governance controls.

The update introduced several agentic tools, including Pega Customer Engagement Studio, an agentic AI workspace for the Pega Customer Decision Hub that combines Pega’s agents and outside tools to automate live campaign creation.

Pega Infinity ‘26 also included Infinity Studio, a development environment integrated with Pega Blueprint AI that allows developers to directly apply process designs during application construction, and connect external coding tools, such as OpenAI, Claude, and GitHub Copilot.

==== Predictable pricing model ====
Pega replaced token-based AI pricing with a flat-rate, outcome-based pricing model for agentic workflows. Under this model, organizations pay a flat rate per completed business case regardless of the amount of AI processing required.

=== Pega Platform ===
Pega Platform is the company's core software product and part of its Pega Infinity portfolio of applications for customer engagement and digital process automation. Its applications work on cloud platforms Google Cloud, Microsoft Azure,Amazon Web Services, and Pivotal’s Cloud Foundry.

=== Legacy Transformation ===
Pega’s legacy transformation services, centered on its Blueprint product, use AI technology to help enterprises modernize aging IT systems and other workflows. Blueprint analyzes existing legacy assets and automatically creates a blueprint for a reimagined, modernized cloud-native application.

In 2026, the company partnered with Amazon Web Services to integrate the Blueprint AI application design agent into AWS Transform to support cloud migration and legacy modernization. The combined analytics software can analyze legacy COBOL code, map business rules, and convert code into cloud applications that include built-in AI agents.

=== Pega GenAI ===
In 2023, Pega GenAI, a set of 20 generative AI boosters were integrated across Pega’s portfolio of products, Pega Infinity. Pegasystems’ GenAI tools are compatible with AWS and Google Cloud’s large language models (LLMs). They include:

Knowledge Buddy, a generative AI-powered assistant that helps users find answers to questions using enterprise knowledge bases. Responses show attributed source content.

Socrates, an AI-powered tutor that teaches clients and partners how to better utilize Pega software. It is named after the Socratic Method and, like that method, uses open-ended questions to teach, rather than feeding students information. The AI agent works in a number of languages.

=== Pega Blueprint ===
Pega Blueprint is an AI agent and design-as-a-service tool that optimizes application workflow design using generative AI. It is powered by the generative AI agent Pega Blueprint AI Application Design Agent. Users provide a description of an application’s purpose to the agent, and it then lays out a blueprint for the app using the same structure that Pega would use to build it. Intellectual property and industry knowledge are integrated into the process. Users can push created blueprints onto Pega’s Infinity platform or Launchpad. Blueprint will automatically generate most of the necessary backend integration, and will flag any further required work. If a company wants to use another platform to build the final application, the Pega-created blueprint can be printed as a PDF and shared with developers.

A virtual example is provided for each blueprint, giving a preview of what the new application will look like. Before it goes live, a human must validate and approve all workflows.

Blueprint will also take legacy artifacts and use its AI capabilities to analyze the data, and then redesign it as a modern cloud-native process. A preview of what the application will look like and working prototypes are provided.

At its 2025 PegaWorld event, Pega highlighted how the AI agent can accelerate workflow design from months to weeks, overcoming obstacles such as outdated systems and technical debt. Blueprint uses a workflow model instead of a prompt model to keep AI agents contained. Developers can use prompts, documentation, automation goal descriptions, source code, and RPA videos to build workflow apps. The workflows provide boundaries and dictate how agents should act when utilized. This model separates AI reasoning during the design period from AI execution during run time.

In 2026, Pega introduced Blueprint for Government, which made the Blueprint AI platform available for federal IT modernization. It also announced its Blueprint agent builder, which organizations can use to design their own agents.

=== Agentic Process Fabric ===
The Agentic Process Fabric manages AI agents across systems and tasks making agents, apps, systems, and data work together. It works with design, conversation, automation, and optimization agents. It selects the appropriate agent, workflow, or dataset for each task. Agentic Process Fabric binds agents to pre-defined workflows, assigns tasks, and can be audited for compliance.

== Partners and projects ==
Pegasystems provides services in the fields of financial services, insurance, life sciences, healthcare, government, manufacturing, high tech, communications and media, energy, and utilities.

Pega partners include Centrica, Coca-Cola, Ford, HCA Healthcare, the Bavarian government in Germany, and Verizon.

The company has partnered with IT outsourcing companies such as Tata Consultancy Services (TCS), Infosys, Wipro, HCL Technologies, Accenture, and Cognizant.

== See also ==
- Advanced case management
- Comparison of Business Process Modeling Notation tools
- SAML-based products and services
