= CommonBond =

CommonBond, Inc.
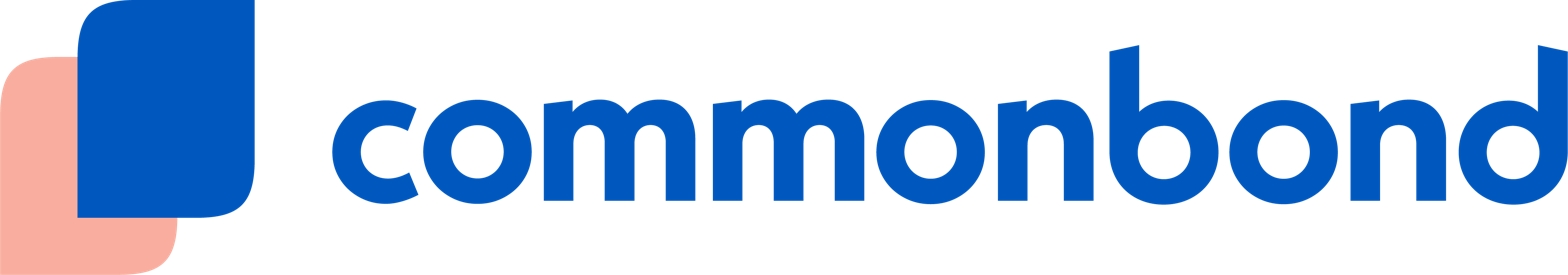
- Company type: Private
- Industry: Financial Services
- Founded: November 2011
- Headquarters: New York, New York
- Products: Student loans
- Website: commonbond.co

CommonBond is a company that refinances graduate and undergraduate student loans for university graduates. CommonBond also provides in-school loans to MBA students at 20 programs in the United States. The company launched nationally in September 2013.

== History ==
CommonBond was founded in November 2012 by David Klein, Michael Taormina, and Jessup Shean, who met at the University of Pennsylvania's Wharton School MBA program. The impetus was the founders' frustration with the lack of affordable loan options to fund their own graduate school education. For their business proposal, the trio was accepted to the Wharton Venture Initiation Program, which serves as a start-up incubator. After deciding to pilot their model at Wharton, the group focused on fundraising during 2012. By the company's launch in November 2012, $2.5 million had been invested by Wharton alumni and $1 million of seed funding was provided by a Wharton alumnus in return for a stake in the company. CommonBond's first fund lent to 40 MBA students and recent graduates at Wharton.

CommonBond expanded to 20 MBA programs across the United States in September 2013, after announcing it had raised over $100 million in equity and debt financing. In March 2014, CommonBond expanded its student loan refinancing and consolidation programs to graduates of law, medical, and engineering programs across the US.

In February 2015, CommonBond expanded its student loan refinancing program to 14 graduate degree programs. At that time, the company also announced a financing partnership with Nelnet (NYSE: NNI). Nelnet committed $150 million to fund CommonBond loan volume and made an equity investment in the company.

In September 2015, CommonBond raised $35 million in Series B funding from August Capital, Nyca Partners, and Victory Park Capital, in a round led by August Capital. Shortly thereafter, the company announced the expansion of its student loan refinancing program to graduates of over 2,000 universities, as well as the introduction of its Parent PLUS Loan refinancing program.

== Products and services ==
In September 2015, CommonBond introduced a new Parent PLUS loan refinancing program, whereby parents who borrowed federal Parent PLUS loans to finance their children’s undergraduate education can refinance those loans through CommonBond.

CommonBond announced a partnership with Prodigy Finance, an international post-graduate student lender, in July 2015. The partnership allows international post-graduate students to secure funding for their business school education in the US through Prodigy Finance, which determines the terms and conditions of the student loans.

== See also ==
- SoFi
- Lending Club
