= Zendesk =

American customer service software company

Zendesk, Inc.
- Type: Private
- Traded as: NYSE: ZEN (2014–2022)
- Industry: Software as a service
- Founded: 2007; 19 years ago in Copenhagen, Denmark
- Founders: Mikkel Svane; Alexander Aghassipour; Morten Primdahl
- Headquarters: 181 Fremont, San Francisco, California, U.S.
- Number of locations: 19 (2022)
- Key people: Tom Eggemeier (CEO)
- Owner: Hellman & Friedman (2022–present); Permira (2022–present)
- Number of employees: 3,830 (2020)
- Website: zendesk.com

Zendesk, Inc. is a software-as-a-service company that provides products related to customer support, sales, and other customer communications. Founded in 2007, it is headquartered in San Francisco, California and has offices in various other countries. The company was publicly traded on the New York Stock Exchange until taken private by Hellman & Friedman and Permira.

== History ==
=== 2007–2013: Founding and early growth ===
Zendesk was founded in Copenhagen, Denmark in 2007 by three friends: Morten Primdahl, Alexander Aghassipour, and Mikkel Svane. They started developing the Zendesk software in Svane's loft. The company was originally funded by the co-founders while working consulting jobs to support their families. Its software-as-a-service product was released in the fall of 2007 and within a few months had approximately 10,000 trial customers.

Initial interest in the software spread through word-of-mouth, particularly in startup companies. Adoption accelerated in 2008 after Twitter began using the software to respond to customer complaints. Interested investors were willing to invest in Zendesk only if it moved to the United States, and in 2009 it relocated to Boston, Massachusetts. Six months later it relocated to San Francisco, California. It initially raised $500,000 in seed funding, followed by an undisclosed series A funding round. It raised more in additional rounds, totaling $86 million by 2012.

Zendesk implemented a price increase in 2010, causing many customers to threaten to leave the service. The company responded by stating it would not alter pricing for existing customers' current features. Zendesk also created its first sales team in 2010. Zendesk moved to larger offices in the Tenderloin neighborhood of San Francisco in 2011, receiving a six-year payroll tax incentive from the city in exchange for doing community service.

By 2011, half of Zendesk's customers were outside the United States. It continued to expand, opening offices internationally in Ireland, Denmark, the United Kingdom and Australia. Although the company was not yet profitable, its revenues grew five-fold from 2010 to 2012. Revenues grew from $38 million in 2012 to $72 million in 2013. It introduced its first app marketplace for third-party Zendesk software in 2012 and by 2013 had 450 employees.

=== 2014–2017: Initial public offering and acquisitions ===
Zendesk filed an initial public offering in 2014, raising $100 million on a $1.7 billion valuation. It made its first acquisition the same year, buying the live-chat app Zopim for $29.8 million.

In 2015, Zendesk acquired the French analytics company BIME for $45 million. The same year, it filed oppositions at the United States Patent and Trademark Office to 49 trademarks including the word "zen". The Electronic Frontier Foundation characterized their approach of filing multiple trademark infringement lawsuits covering a wide range of businesses as trademark trolling, and EFF condemned the practice.

In 2016, Zendesk changed its logo and rebranded to emphasize contacting customers proactively. It also added features that turn online reviews and comments into a customer help ticket. It added features that tell customer service agents which portions of the website a customer visited before contacting customer support, and added features that attempt to predict which customers are most likely to cancel their subscription service.

Zendesk acquired software developer Outbound.io in 2017. Its software was used to help businesses respond to complaints and manage direct communications with customers on social media sites. The same year, Zendesk added an AI bot to its software to help direct customers to answers for their questions. The bot had limited functionality but was expanded two years later. It also opened an office in Singapore in 2017.

=== 2018–2021: Expansion into sales and messaging ===
Zendesk eventually expanded from customer service to also managing other customer interactions, such as sales. Its first move into sales software was with the $50 million acquisition of Base, a developer of sales automation software. Base was later renamed Sell, and a Sell Marketplace was created for corresponding third-party apps. In 2018, Zendesk introduced Zendesk Suite, a software that combined social media, live-chat, email, and other complaints into a single ticket system. An enterprise version of the software-as-a-service product was also released, with Zendesk receiving 40 percent of its revenue from large businesses by that time. By 2018, Zendesk had annual revenues of $500 million.

In 2019, Zendesk acquired Smooch, an omnichannel messaging platform. Smooch provided messaging services on websites for live-chat customer support. Part of the social media software acquired from Smooch was rebranded as Sunshine Conversations, a tool that competes with Salesforce.com. The same year, Zendesk disclosed the discovery of a data breach from 2016 which resulted in potential exposure of information about users of certain Zendesk products.

In 2020, Zendesk announced more tools for messaging customers on social media and enhancements to its customer relationship management features. Zendesk's sales automation software was revamped with Zendesk Sell in 2020, improving integration with Zendesk's customer support software. Since then, Zendesk marketplace has integrated several third parties technologies to provide more services to the end customers. In 2021 for example, several companies joined Zendesk marketplace, such as Crowlingo for multilingual data collection, Verse for lead conversion and ViiBE for remote visual support.

In October 2021, Zendesk announced plans to acquire Momentive Global Inc., formerly SurveyMonkey, for $4.13 billion. Its investors rejected the deal due to risk, and the agreement to purchase was cancelled in February 2022.

=== 2022–present: Private acquisition and AI expansion ===
In June 2022, Zendesk announced that it would be acquired by a consortium of private-equity firms led by Permira and Hellman & Friedman in an all-cash deal worth $10.2 billion. The purchase was completed in November 2022, with Tom Eggemeier becoming the new CEO.

Zendesk purchased the workforce management company Tymeshift in 2023. The company's software uses artificial intelligence to track agent activity, productivity, and efficiency in real time. The following year it purchased Klaus, an AI powered platform that evaluates AI agent interactions an identifies actions that require human intervention.

In May 2025, Zendesk acquired Australian company Local Measure for $100 million. The acquisition allowed Zendesk to expand its AI-powered voice agents In July 2025, Zendesk acquired HyperArc, an AI analytics platform. In December 2025, Zendesk acquired Unleash, an enterprise search platform that connects knowledge across internal systems for AI-driven employee service tools.

In March 2026, Zendesk announced that it had entered into a definitive agreement to acquire Forethought, an AI customer experience company focused on automating customer service interactions. Forethought’s technology uses AI agents to automate support workflows such as ticket triage and responses, and by 2025 it supported more than one billion customer interactions per month. Zendesk said it planned to integrate Forethought’s technology into its platform to expand AI-driven customer service automation.

== Products and services ==
Zendesk's main product is customer service software that helps companies respond to customer complaints. It organizes inquiries from email, phone, or social media into a unified ticketing system. Tickets can then be assigned to a customer support representative for response. The software also allows for the creation of help and frequently asked question pages. Zendesk also sells CRM software for sales teams that helps track potential customers and sales. It also provides tools for internal employee support such as IT help desks. Initially, Zendesk's software was focused on assisting small businesses, but transitioned to aid larger companies.

Its software also uses artificial intelligence that allows its AI agents to automatically answer common support questions and suggest responses to customer service employees. Zendesk claims its AI agent can resolve 80 percent of support issues.

== Integrations ==
Zendesk allows its software to connect with third-party apps through its app marketplace. The marketplace offers add-on applications that let companies link Zendesk to other software they use, such as Salesforce, Slack, Shopify, and Jira. Zendesk also partners with Amazon Web Services to integrate AWS Support into its productions, including artificial intelligence features. Zendesk tools can also be integrated inside Microsoft 365 applications. The integration lets employees submit and track support requests without leaving Microsoft's software.
