= Act! LLC =

Customer relationship management software

ACT!
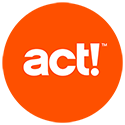
- Release: 1 April 1987 (39 years ago)
- Stable release: 26.1 / 4 February 2025; 20 months ago
- Operating system: Microsoft Windows
- Platform: • Microsoft SQL Server • .NET Framework
- Available in: English, French, German
- Type: • CRM software • Contact management software • Marketing automation software
- Website: www.act.com

ACT! (previously known as Activity Control Technology, Automated Contact Tracking, ACT! by Sage, and Sage ACT!) is a customer relationship management and marketing automation software platform designed for small and medium-sized businesses. It has over 2.8 million registered users as of December 2014.

== History ==
The company Conductor Software was founded in 1986, in Dallas, Texas, by Pat Sullivan and Mike Muhney. The original name for the software was Activity Control Technology; it was renamed to Automated Contact Tracking, later abbreviated to ACT. The name of the company was subsequently changed to Contact Software International and it was sold in 1993 to Symantec Corporation, who in 1999 then sold it to SalesLogix. The Sage Group purchased Interact Commerce (formerly SalesLogix) in 2001 through Best Software, then its North American software division. Swiftpage acquired it in 2013.

Beginning with the 2006 version, the name was styled ACT! by Sage, and in 2010 revised to Sage ACT!.

Following its 2013 acquisition by Swiftpage, it was renamed to ACT! Swiftpage.

In May 2018, ACT! was sold to SFW Advisors.

In December 2018, Kuvana, a marketing automation software solution, was acquired by SFW and merged with ACT! This add-on is now a complementary service to the core CRM solution.

In December 2019, ACT! hired Steve Oriola as chairman and CEO.

In 2020, Swiftpage changed its company name to ACT!.

In March 2023, ACT! hired Bruce Reading as President and CEO.

== Software ==
ACT! features include contact, company and opportunity management, a calendar, marketing automation and e-marketing tools, reports, interactive dashboards with graphical visualizations, and the ability to track prospective customers.

ACT! integrates with Microsoft Word, Excel, Outlook, Google Contacts, Gmail, and other applications via Zapier. For custom integrations, ACT! has an in-built API.

ACT! can be accessed from Windows desktops (Win7 and later) with local or network shared database; synchronized to laptops or remote officers; Citrix or Remote Desktop; Web browsers (Premium only) with self or SaaS hosting; smartphones and tablets via HTML5 Web (Premium only); smartphones and tablets via sync with Handheld Contact.

== See also ==
- Lists of software
- Sales force management system
- CRM software
