= Base CRM =

Enterprise software company

- Type: Private
- Industry: Enterprise software
- Founded: 2009
- Founder: Uzi Shmilovici; Bart Kiszala; Pawel Niznik; Ela Madej; Agata Mazur
- Headquarters: Mountain View, USA
- Services: Cloud computing Mobile enterprise solutions CRM; Sales Intelligence
- Number of employees: 150 (2017)
- Website: www.getbase.com

Base CRM (originally Future Simple or PipeJump, now Zendesk) is an enterprise software company based in Mountain View, California with R&D offices located in Kraków, Poland. It provides a web-based all-in-one sales platform that features tools for email, phone dialing, pipeline management, forecasting, reporting and more. Base's platform is available on iOS and Android, and was the first full native CRM Android app available. On September 10, 2018 Base was acquired by Zendesk and later rebranded as Zendesk Sell.

== Reception ==
Base has been recognized by many publications - including Forbes, Crain's Chicago Business, ReadWrite, and The Next Web - for its intuitiveness, mobility and clean design.

In July 2012, Box (service) CEO, Aaron Levie was asked at VentureBeat's MobileBeat summit about designing enterprise applications for mobile. He said, "Mobile must be first when you're building an enterprise company" and identified Base as an example.

In February, 2013 Base was recognized by Forbes as one of 10 Mobile Apps to Organize Your Business. In October 2014, Fortune positioned Base as the next major disruptor in the CRM space.

In June 2016 the Business Card Reader for Base CRM for Android was released. In January 2017 the new product Call Tracker for Base CRM appeared on Google Play.

== Acquisition ==
On September 10, 2018 it was announced that Zendesk acquired FutureSimple Inc., the company behind Base. Three months later, Base was rebranded as Zendesk Sell and introduced a deeper integration with Zendesk products.

== History ==
The company's flagship CRM product was launched November, 2009 under the name Pipejump. In November 2011, the product was rebranded with the name Base, as it is known today. Base CRM was co-founded in 2009 by Uzi Shmilovici, Bart Kiszala, Pawel Niznik, Ela Madej and Agata Mazur after they became frustrated by their own experience with other CRM products on the market.

Base has received a total venture capital funding of US$53 million from several investors including RRE Ventures, Index Ventures, The Social+Capital Partnership, OCA Ventures, and I2A. In September 2015, Base raised $30 million in Series C funding led by Tenaya Capital, with participation from Index Ventures.

At the company’s annual Forecast sales conference in June 2016, Base announced its new sales science platform, Apollo.

== See also ==
- Comparison of CRM systems
- Customer relationship management
