= Chordiant =

American software company

Chordia
- Company type: formerly: Public
- Traded as: Nasdaq: CHRD
- Industry: Software
- Founded: 1997
- Defunct: March 15, 2010
- Headquarters: Cupertino, California, United States
- Area served: United States; Europe
- Key people: Steven Springsteel (CEO)
- Products: Customer Relationship Management (CRM)
- Parent: Pegasystems
- Website: www.pega.com

Chordiant, formerly known as Chordiant Software and J. Frank Consulting, was an American software company which offered enterprise software to help other companies improve customer experience. Now owned by Pegasystems, it was headquartered in Cupertino, California.

Chordiant provided Business Process Management (BPM), Customer relationship management (CRM), and Enterprise Decision Management (EDM) software, which enables building applications that enhances customer interaction. Applications built using the company's framework were widely used by large organisations in the United States and Europe.

== History ==
Chordiant originally began under the name J. Frank Consulting, a consulting company. In 1997, it transformed into a software company and re-branded as Chordiant Software. In February 2000, it went public and traded under NASDAQ. The company's stock hit an initial high point of $53 shortly after going public, but soon crashed to single digits months later as the software industry in general suffered a significant decline.

Initially, Chordiant's software was developed on Forte 4GL platform. After seeing the promise of the emerging Java EE technologies, the company moved its software to a Java-based platform and became one of the first packaged enterprise software vendors to ship a completely Java EE-based product suite.

On March 15, 2010, Pegasystems, a competing company, announced it had acquired Chordiant for a price of approximately $161.5 million.
