= AngelPad =

American seed-stage startup incubator

- Industry: Startup accelerator
- Founded: 2010
- Founder: Thomas Korte, Carine Magescas
- Headquarters: San Francisco, CA
- Key people: Thomas Korte, Carine Magescas
- Website: angelpad.com

AngelPad is an American seed-stage startup incubator, launched in September 2010 by Thomas Korte and Carine Magescas with six other former Google employees as mentors. AngelPad provides mentorship, seed money, and networking at two 10-week courses per year.

AngelPad attracted attention in August 2011 after announcing that each of its startups will have the option to accept $100,000 from two venture capital firms at the start of their class.

== Program ==
The program consists of ten weeks of mentorship, brainstorming, fundraising, and pragmatic advice, concluding with a "Demo Day" in which companies present their value propositions and ideas to hundreds of investors.

== Application Process ==
The application process consists of a written application, starting on the incubator's website.

Fewer than 15 startups were selected out of a pool of 800 applicants for the Winter 2011 class, for an acceptance rate of 1.9%.

== Notable alumni companies ==
Several AngelPad companies have attracted significant rounds of investment or sold to larger companies after completing the incubator program. Notable portfolio companies include: Buffer, CoverHound, MoPub, Postmates, Astrid, Drone Deploy, Ribbon, Pipedrive, Rolepoint and Vungle.

Postmates got acquired by Uber for $2.65 billion and Vungle got acquired by Blackstone for a reported $750 million.

== See also ==
- Business incubator
- Seed accelerator
- Y Combinator (company)
- Techstars
