= Aptean =

American enterprise software company

- Type: Privately held company
- Industry: Software
- Predecessor: Merger of Consona Corporation and CDC Software
- Founded: August 2012; 13 years ago
- Headquarters: Alpharetta, Georgia, United States
- Products: ERP Software, Supply chain software, MES Software, PLM Software
- Number of employees: 4,500 (2026)

Aptean is an American software company based in Alpharetta, Georgia. It develops enterprise software that supports core operational functions such as manufacturing, distribution, supply chain management, and product lifecycle management (PLM). The company’s products are used by mid-sized and enterprise organisations operating in industries including food and beverage, fresh produce, fashion and apparel, transportation, retail, logistics, financial services, and both process manufacturing and discrete manufacturing.

== History ==
Aptean was formed in August 2012 through the merger of Consona Corporation, an Indianapolis-based ERP and CRM software provider, and CDC Software, a spin-out of CDC Corporation.

In 2015 Aptean entered the healthcare-software field by acquiring Canada-based Medworxx Solutions.

In late 2024, Reuters reported that Aptean subsidiary Logility was exploring a sale with Lazard as financial advisor. A competing offer was disclosed in March 2025.

By early 2025, Aptean had completed 55 acquisitions under the leadership of CEO TVN Reddy, who was appointed in 2018, expanding the company’s operational footprint and sector-specific product offerings. Industry research estimates indicate Aptean serves over 11,000 customers.

== Recognition ==
Aptean has been included in several industry rankings and analyst reports.

- In 2025, Aptean’s software received the Texprocess Best New Concept Award from Messe Frankfurt Inc.
- In 2025, Solutions Review listed Aptean among the “Best ERP Software Companies.”
- In 2024, Aptean’s Food and Beverage ERP was named a winner of the Top Software & Technology Solutions award by Food Logistics and Supply & Demand Chain Executive.
- In 2023, The Software Report included Aptean among the top 10% of global software companies in its annual Power 500 ranking of software companies.
- In 2023, Frost & Sullivan recognized Aptean with its Customer Value Leadership Award for Food and Beverage ERP solutions.

== See also ==
- Enterprise resource planning
- Manufacturing execution system
