= WORKetc =

Cloud-based CRM

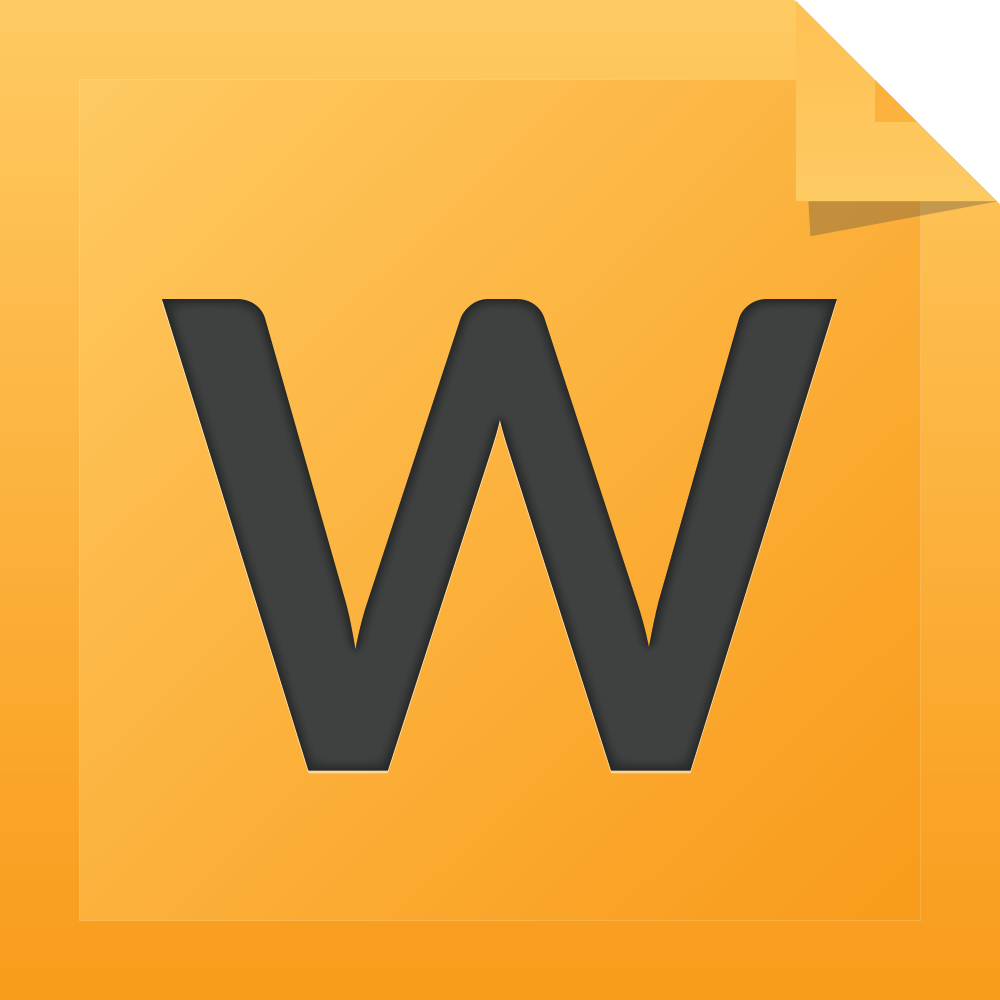
- Founded: 2009; 17 years ago
- Founder: Daniel Barnett
- Headquarters: Sydney, Australia
- Website: www.worketc.com

WORKetc is a cloud-based CRM business management platform for small to medium businesses. The company was founded in 2009 by Daniel Barnett, son of Colin Barnett, and is headquartered in Sydney, Australia.

== History ==
The company was founded in 2009 by Daniel Barnett. The company went under the name of Veetro before changing its name to WORKetc in 2008. WORKetc is headquartered in Australia but operates as a micro-multinational enterprise and consists of a team of 12 working in Australia, America, Canada, China, and the Philippines. WORKetc ranked 75 in the 2013 Deloitte Technology Fast500 Asia Pacific.

In 2016, the company announced that it planned to list on the ASX.

== Product ==
WORKetc is a cloud-based SaaS application that combines CRM, project management, billing, help desk and collaboration modules into one business management platform. WORKetc is able to integrate with Xero, QuickBooks, G Suite, Evernote and Microsoft Outlook.
