= SuiteCRM =

Customer relationship management software

- Developer: SuiteCRM
- Release: October 23, 2013
- Stable release: 8.9.2 / January 13, 2026; 6 months ago
- Written in: PHP
- Operating system: Cross-platform
- Type: Customer Relationship Management
- License: AGPL
- Website: suitecrm.com
- Repository: github.com/SuiteCRM/SuiteCRM-Core/releases

SuiteCRM is an open-source Customer Relationship Management application for servers written in PHP.

It is a software fork of the popular customer relationship management (CRM) system from SugarCRM and its base is built on the last open-source SugarCRM release. The SuiteCRM project began when SugarCRM decided to stop the development of its open-source version. (Open-source CRM is often used as an alternative to proprietary CRM software from major corporations such as HubSpot, Salesforce, and Microsoft Dynamics CRM applications.)

It was originally released on October 21, 2013, as version 7.0 and provides upgrade paths for existing SugarCRM users. It is an extended version of SugarCRM which contains additional security fixes not available in SugarCRM.

SuiteCRM comprises the last release of the SugarCRM Community Edition plus the following additional modules:

- Products
- Quotes
- Contracts
- Invoices
- PDF Templates
- Workflow
- Reporting
- Search
- Events
- Google Maps
- Teams Security
- Portal
- Responsive Theme
- Outlook plugin
- Surveys

A six-month release cycle is maintained with bug fix and security releases being made available between major releases.

== Modules ==
- Accounts
- Contacts
- Opportunities
- Leads
- Calendar
- Calls
- Meetings
- Email Templates
- Emails
- Emails – LTS
- Tasks
- Notes
- Documents
- Targets
- Target Lists
- Campaigns
- Surveys
- Bugs
- Cases
- Projects
- Employees

=== Advanced Modules ===
- PDF Templates
- Knowledge Base
- Sales
- Workflows
- Workflow Calculated Fields
- Cases with Portal
- Events
- Reports
- Reschedule

== Awards ==
SuiteCRM won the BOSSIE Award 2015 and BOSSIE Award 2016 for the world's best Open Source CRM.

== See also ==
- SugarCRM
