= Sales force management system =

Automation software systems

Sales force management systems (also sales force automation (SFA) systems) are information systems used in customer relationship management (CRM) marketing and management that help automate some sales and sales force management functions. They are often combined with a marketing information system, in which case they are often called CRM systems.

== See also ==
- Comparison of CRM systems
  - Comparison of mobile CRM systems
- Information technology management
- Predictive analytics – Statistical techniques analyzing facts to make predictions about unknown events
- Sales Management Systems – Microsoft software

== Sources ==
- Rodriguez, Michael; Honeycutt, Earl D. (2011). "Customer Relationship Management (CRM)'s Impact on B to B Sales Professionals' Collaboration and Sales Performance". Journal of Business-To-Business Marketing. 18 (4): 335–356. doi:10.1080/1051712X.2011.574252. S2CID 167515127.
- Jordan, Jason (2010-07-31). "Sales Management Best Practices: Six Essential Processes". Sales & Marketing Management.
- Darmon, René Y. (2007). Introduction to the Dynamic Sales Force Management Process. Cambridge University Press. ISBN 978-0-521-84834-3.
- Haag, Stephen; Cummings, Maeve; McCubbrey, Donald J.; Pinsonneault, Alain; Donovan, Richard (2006). Management Information Systems for the Information Age (Third Canadian ed.). Canada: McGraw-Hill Ryerson. pp. 50 & 176–177. ISBN 0-07-095569-7.
