= Booksy =

American-Polish beauty and wellness platform

Booksy, Inc.

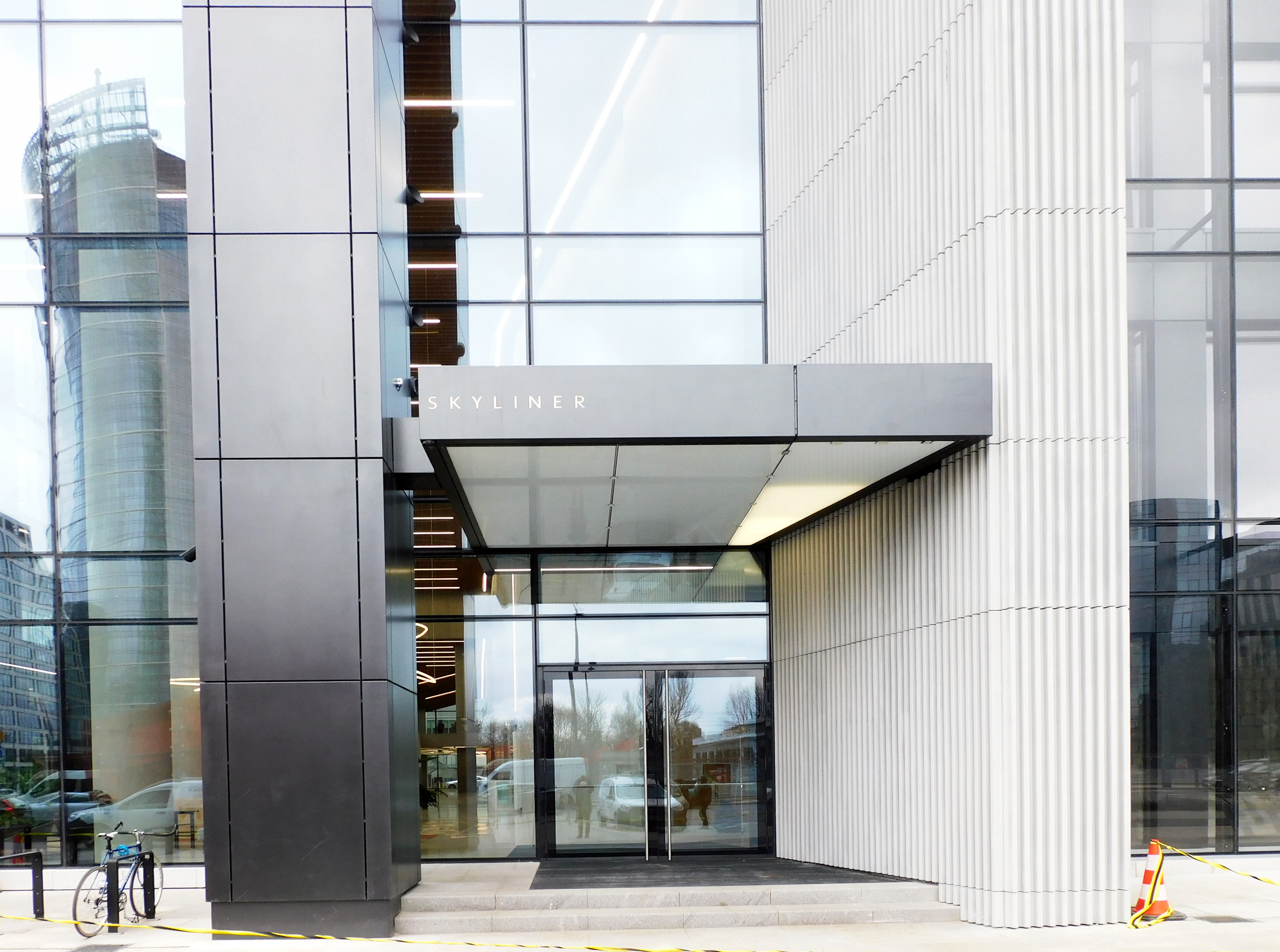
- Entrance to the Skyliner in Warsaw, where Booksy’s offices are located
- Type: Private
- Industry: Software as a service; Beauty services; Online marketplace
- Founded: July 8, 2014; 12 years ago in Warsaw, Poland
- Founder: Stefan Batory; Konrad Howard; Agnieszka Zembrzycka; Tomasz Zembrzycki
- Headquarters: Chicago, Illinois, U.S.
- Area served: United States; United Kingdom; Poland; Spain; France; Mexico; Brazil; South Africa
- Key people: Stefan Batory (CEO); Konrad Howard (CPO); Greg Sheppard (CPCO); Selim Dogguy (CTO); Kristina Salen (CFO)
- Products: Booksy; Booksy Biz; Booksy Med; Booksy Marketplace; Booksy Payments; Booksy Store
- Services: Appointment scheduling software; Client relationship management; Payment processing; Marketplace services; B2B e-commerce platform
- Number of employees: 700 (2024)
- Website: booksy.com

Booksy is a software-as-a-service and marketplace platform company operating in the beauty and wellness industry, founded in Warsaw, Poland in 2014, headquartered in Chicago, Illinois. Its namesake platform provides appointment scheduling software, client management tools, and payment processing services for hair salons, barbershops, beauty salons, and wellness service providers.

As of 2020, Booksy was available in 25 countries including the United States, United Kingdom, Poland, Spain, Mexico, Brazil, South Africa. and France. In 2024, the platform served over 40 million consumers and 140,000 businesses globally, facilitating 260 million appointments annually worth over $10 billion in transaction value.

== History ==
=== Founding and early years (2014–2017) ===
Booksy was founded in July 2014 by Polish entrepreneurs Stefan Batory and Konrad Howard who adopted a global-first strategy from inception, with their first client based in the United States. Batory, a mathematician and ultramarathoner who had previously founded a taxi-hailing app iTaxi, relocated to California to focus on the American market. In the 2000s, he founded a web portal Ahoj.pl, and software company Eo Networks. Howard, a software engineer and user experience designer, had managed e-commerce sites in the United States, United Kingdom, and South Africa. Additional co-founders included Agnieszka and Tomasz Zembrzycki, who had earlier developed a beauty portal Wizaz.pl.

The concept for Booksy emerged from Batory's personal frustration as a marathon runner who struggled to schedule appointments with massage therapists while working a full-time job and raising two children. Batory partnered with Howard to develop a solution to eliminate the need for real-time phone coordination. The founders considered multiple service categories, but ultimately focused on beauty and wellness after determining those services offered the best product-market fit.

In September 2015, Booksy secured seed funding of PLN 3 million, achieving a valuation of PLN 20 million. By January 2016, the company employed 80 people and served 5,000 salons with over 20,000 users. The platform recorded 339,000 appointments by November 2015, with 42% of bookings occurring outside business hours. By December 2015, the total financing amounted to PLN 12 million.

In March 2017, Booksy raised a $4.2 million Series A round. At the time, the platform was processing 1 million monthly reservations and was valued at $35 million, with over 100 employees. In June 2019, Batory claimed Booksy was used by 15% of Wrocław residents and 10% of Warsaw residents, while its U.S. monthly user base had reached 20% of Uber's reach and 25% of Airbnb's.

=== Expansion and partnerships (2018–2020) ===
In July 2018, Booksy completed a $13.2 million Series B funding round (PLN 49.3 million) led by Piton Capital, with investments including Sebastian Kulczyk's Manta Ray Ventures. The same month, Booksy acquired its Polish competitor Lavito, which had 400,000 users, and 2,500 salons. The combined entity processed 2.5 million global appointments monthly.

In 2019, the platform's client base included high-profile users including Barack Obama's personal barber, Beyoncé's stylist Kimberly Kimble, Neymar's barber, and Nergal's barbershop chain. The same year, Booksy partnered with L'Oréal, integrating approximately 900 expert salons in Poland and achieving monthly transaction values of 300 million PLN in Poland. At the time, Booksy was facilitating over 2 million appointments monthly with an annualized value of $620 million and serving 4.2 million users globally.

In September 2019, Booksy raised another $28.5 million round (PLN 115 million), which amounted to PLN 200 million in total. The company was valued at $710 million, processing 2.6 million monthly appointments with 5 million users and 300,000 service providers.

During 2020, Booksy expanded into non-beauty sectors, partnering with financial institutions including BNP Paribas, Alior Bank, and Crédit Agricole, as well as an electronics retailer X-Kom, and telecom provider Play. In August 2020, Booksy acquired U.S.-based competitor GoPanache, which served 500,000 users. By September 2020, Booksy had grown to 7 million users across 25 countries, processing 60-70% more appointments than traditional booking methods.

=== Consolidation and pandemic response (2020–2021) ===
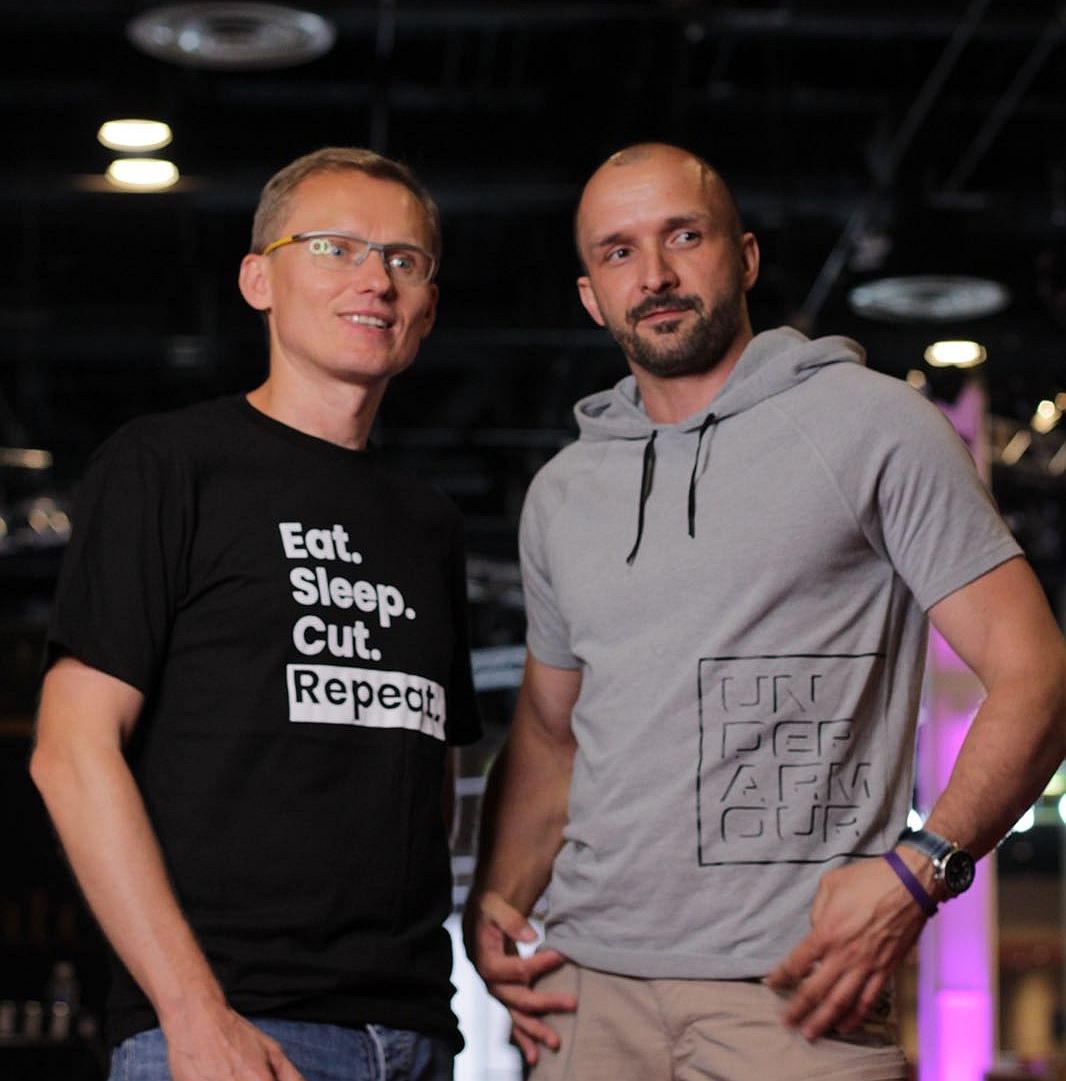
Booksy co-founders Stefan Batory and Konrad Howard on the hair show Premiere Orlando, June 2018

In December 2020, Booksy merged with its largest Polish competitor, Versum (which operated a reservation portal Moment.pl), creating a combined entity with 13 million active consumers and 500 employees. Versum founders Sebastian Maśka and Paweł Kantyka joined Booksy's management team, with the merger projected to generate 100 million visits valued at 10 billion PLN in 2021.

During the COVID-19 pandemic, in March 2020, Booksy experienced revenue declines of up to 70% in some markets as beauty salons closed, forcing workforce reductions from 350 employees to 180. Following the easing of restrictions, the company experienced record demand, with June, July, and August 2020 becoming the company's most profitable months to date. On May 13, 2020, the platform received 500,000 reservation requests within 24 hours of salon reopening announcements. The workforce subsequently grew to 230 employees by mid-2020, expanding to 500 following the Versum merger.

In January 2021, Booksy completed a $70 million Series C funding round. This brought total fundraising to $120 million (PLN 450 million). In September 2021, Booksy acquired Genbook, a Sydney-headquartered competitor with U.S. operations serving 22,000 businesses. In November 2021, the company acquired French competitor Kiute, which served 10,000 salons and was described as "one of the largest Polish acquisitions abroad." By the end of 2021, Booksy had reached 20 million users globally and employed 1,200 people at its peak.

=== Growth (2022–present) ===
In July 2022, Booksy underwent restructuring to achieve profitability in 2023, operating with 700 employees as of 2024. In 2024, Booksy reported revenue of $65.9 million (PLN 260 million), generating over $10 billion in annual platform transaction volume while processing more than 260 million appointments. The company serves over 40 million consumers and over 140,000 businesses globally, with operations focused on five core markets: United States, United Kingdom, Poland, Spain, and France.

In May 2024, Booksy acquired a Polish medical and physiotherapy platform Znajdź Gabinet [Find a Salon], expanding beyond the beauty sector into healthcare services.

In April 2026, co-founder Howard stepped back from managing of Booksy, while remaining a shareholder. Batory continued as CEO. In September 2026, Batory announced a workforce reduction of 20 percent, attributing to the company's implementation of artificial intelligence-based mechanisms. As of September 2026, the platform served 350,000 business clients. 70 percent of Booksy's revenue came from subscriptions, 25 percent from marketplace commissions, and 5 percent from payment processing commissions.

== Products and services ==
Booksy is a software suite that provides appointment-based businesses with a customer relationship management, marketing automation, inventory management, point-of-sale management, financial reporting, the management of commission for employees, and in-app payments.

Booksy Biz
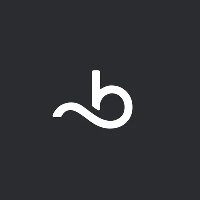

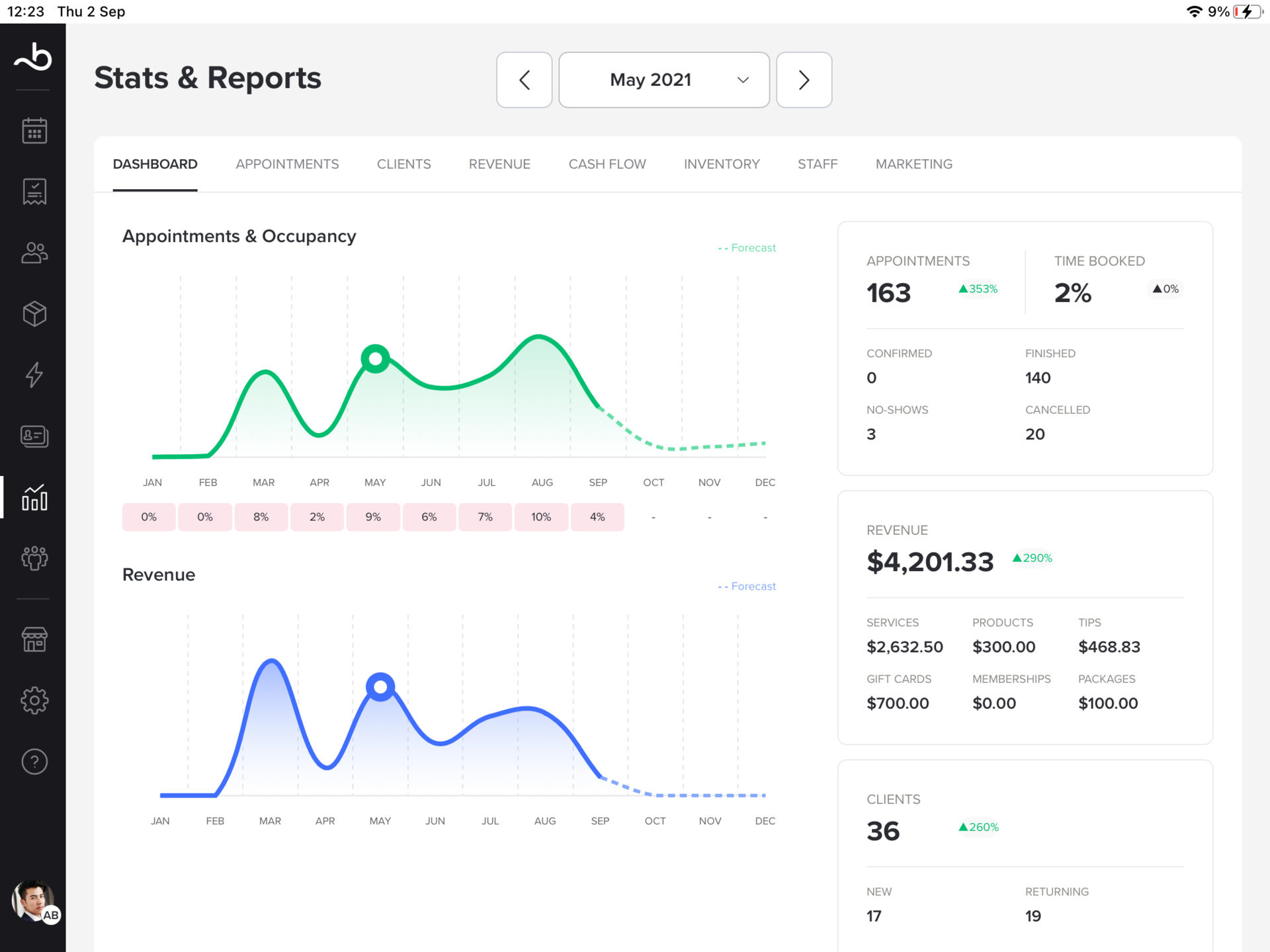
- Example dashboard with analytics inside Booksy Biz web app
- Developer: Booksy International
- Release: 2014; 12 years ago
- Engine: Appointment scheduling software
- Platform: Web platform; Android; iOS
- Type: Customer relationship management; Workflow management system; Time-tracking software; Marketing automation; Inventory management software; Financial reporting
- License: Proprietary
- Website: biz.booksy.com

- Booksy – a booking management mobile app that allows customers to self-book visits to beauty salons, barbers, hairdressers, massage therapists, and nail technicians in a convenient booking process.
- Booksy Biz – primary offering for service providers, featuring appointment scheduling, calendar management, client relationship management, point-of-sale functionality, and analytics. The platform includes appointment reminders, online booking capabilities available 24/7, and marketing tools designed to help businesses attract new clients.
- Booksy Med – an additional module for physiotherapists and osteopaths required to maintain electronic medical records. Integrated with official medical databases that issue e-referrals.
- Booksy Marketplace – allows service providers to promote their businesses to potential clients through paid placement in the consumer-facing app. Service providers pay a commission when they acquire new clients through the marketplace.
- Booksy Boost – a promotion system of prioritizing a profile's position on the Booksy marketplace, to help businesses increase bookings and foster customer relationships. Businesses are charged a commission only when new clients book an appointment.
- Booksy Payments – transaction processing for service providers directly through the platform. By 2025, the payments feature expanded to Poland, France, and the United Kingdom.
- Booksy Store – a B2B e-commerce platform integrated into Booksy Biz that allows salon owners to order professional beauty products directly from suppliers. The platform features inventory tracking, direct ordering from over 150,000 products, and point-of-sale integration for retail sales within salons. Launched in May 2024 in Poland as the test market before expansion to other markets.

=== Platform integrations ===
Booksy integrates with major social platforms including Google Reserve (appointment booking through Google Search and Google Maps), Instagram, and Yelp. In May 2019, Booksy was selected as one of four companies to integrate globally with Facebook's Appointments feature, enabling businesses to manage bookings directly through their Facebook pages. In November 2025, Booksy integrated their appointment management systems with AI agents including Google Search AI-powered results AI Overviews.

== Recognition and awards ==
In September 2018, Booksy was named one of the five fastest-growing marketplaces globally by Andreessen Horowitz.

In January 2026, co-founders Batory and Howard received a Wektory award from Pracodawcy RP (Employers of Poland), recognized as "creators of a global platform that revolutionized the services market." In 2024, Booksy was selected to join Endeavor, a global network supporting high-impact entrepreneurs.
