= Zoho CRM (application) =

Customer relationship management software

- Developer: Zoho Corporation
- Release: 2005; 21 years ago
- Operating system: Web, Android, iOS
- Platform: SaaS
- Type: Customer relationship management
- License: Proprietary
- Website: zoho.com/crm

Zoho CRM is a cloud-based customer relationship management (CRM) application developed by Zoho Corporation, an India-based technology company. It is delivered as a software-as-a-service (SaaS) product and includes features for managing sales processes, marketing activities, and customer support.

== History ==
Zoho CRM was launched in 2005 by Zoho Corporation. In 2010, Zoho partnered with Google as a launch partner for the Google Apps Marketplace, allowing Google Apps users to access Zoho CRM within their existing accounts.

In 2012, Zoho CRM was launched on the Google Play Store, providing Android users with mobile access to customer data, including accounts, leads, and contacts.

In 2016, Zoho launched a multichannel version of Zoho CRM, integrating email, social media, live chat, and phone into a unified platform. The update introduced SalesSignals, providing real-time notifications of customer interactions across channels.

In 2017, Zoho launched Zia, an AI powered virtual assistant for Zoho CRM. Zia provides real-time insights, detects anomalies, suggests workflows, and automates routine sales tasks.

In June 2024, Zoho introduced an update to the platform under the title CRM for Everyone. The update included features intended to facilitate collaboration between departments within an organization.

In June 2024, Zoho CRM introduced updates that included AI powered analytics features and support for integrating open source artificial intelligence models into the platform.

In February 2025, Zoho released a preview of Zia AI agents in Zoho CRM. These agents perform predefined tasks related to support, sales, and marketing workflows. Zoho also introduced the Zia Agent Marketplace, where users can select, modify, and use these agents within the CRM system.

== Bigin ==
Bigin was launched in 2020. It is intended to support basic customer operations such as sales tracking, onboarding, service delivery, and customer support.

In 2024, Zoho released an update to Bigin. The update introduced Team Pipelines, allowing different teams to manage their operations independently within the same system, and Connected Pipelines, which enable the transfer of customer data between various stages and processes.

== Operations ==
In November 2013, Zoho conducted a marketing activity during the Salesforce Dreamforce conference in San Francisco. Although not an official participant in the event, Zoho utilized pedicabs and food trucks bearing its branding in the vicinity of the conference venue.

In September 2015, Zoho conducted a guerrilla marketing campaign in San Francisco to coincide with Salesforce's annual Dreamforce conference. The advertisements featured comparative messages directed at Salesforce, referencing pricing differences and other business metrics.
