= Social media mining =

Obtaining data from a social media user's content

Social media mining is the process of obtaining data from user-generated content on social media in order to extract actionable patterns, form conclusions about users, and act upon the information. Mining supports targeting advertising to users or academic research. The term is an analogy to the process of mining for minerals. Mining companies sift through raw ore to find the valuable minerals; likewise, social media mining sifts through social media data in order to discern patterns and trends about matters such as social media usage, online behaviour, content sharing, connections between individuals, buying behaviour. These patterns and trends are of interest to companies, governments and not-for-profit organizations, as such organizations can use the analyses for tasks such as design strategies, introduce programs, products, processes or services.

Social media mining uses concepts from computer science, data mining, machine learning, and statistics. Mining is based on social network analysis, network science, sociology, ethnography, optimization and mathematics. It attempts to formally represent, measure and model patterns from social media data. In the 2010s, major corporations, governments and not-for-profit organizations began mining to learn about customers, clients and others.

Platforms such as Google, Facebook (partnered with Datalogix and BlueKai) conduct mining to target users with advertising. Scientists and machine learning researchers extract insights and design product features.

Users may not understand how platforms use their data. Users tend to click through Terms of Use agreements without reading them, leading to ethical questions about whether platforms adequately protect users' privacy.

During the 2016 United States presidential election, Facebook allowed Cambridge Analytica, a political consulting firm linked to the Trump campaign, to analyze the data of an estimated 87 million Facebook users to profile voters, creating controversy when this was revealed.

== Background ==
As defined by Kaplan and Haenlein, social media is the "group of internet-based applications that build on the ideological and technological foundations of Web 2.0, and that allow the creation and exchange of user-generated content." There are many categories of social media including, but not limited to, social networking (Facebook or LinkedIn), microblogging (Twitter), photo sharing (Flickr, Instagram, Photobucket, or Picasa), news aggregation (Google Reader, StumbleUpon, or Feedburner), video sharing (YouTube, MetaCafe), livecasting (Ustream or Twitch), virtual worlds (Kaneva), social gaming (World of Warcraft), social search (Google, Bing, or Ask.com), and instant messaging (Google Talk, Skype, or Yahoo! messenger).

The first social media website was introduced by GeoCities in 1994. It enabled users to create their own homepages without having a sophisticated knowledge of HTML coding. The first social networking site, SixDegrees.com, was introduced in 1997. Since then, many other social media sites have been introduced, each providing service to millions of people. These individuals form a virtual world in which individuals (social atoms), entities (content, sites, etc.) and interactions (between individuals, between entities, between individuals and entities) coexist. Social norms and human behavior govern this virtual world. By understanding these social norms and models of human behavior and combining them with the observations and measurements of this virtual world, one can systematically analyze and mine social media. Social media mining is the process of representing, analyzing, and extracting meaningful patterns from data in social media, resulting from social interactions. It is an interdisciplinary field encompassing techniques from computer science, data mining, machine learning, social network analysis, network science, sociology, ethnography, statistics, optimization, and mathematics. Social media mining faces grand challenges such as the big data paradox, obtaining sufficient samples, the noise removal fallacy, and evaluation dilemma. Social media mining represents the virtual world of social media in a computable way, measures it, and designs models that can help us understand its interactions. In addition, social media mining provides necessary tools to mine this world for interesting patterns, analyze information diffusion, study influence and homophily, provide effective recommendations, and analyze novel social behavior in social media.

== Uses ==
Social media mining is used across several industries including business development, social science research, health services, and educational purposes. Once the data received goes through social media analytics, it can then be applied to these various fields. Often, companies use the patterns of connectivity that pervade social networks, such as assortativity—the social similarity between users that are induced by influence, homophily, and reciprocity and transitivity. These forces are then measured via statistical analysis of the nodes and connections between these nodes. Social analytics also uses sentiment analysis, because social media users often relay positive or negative sentiment in their posts. This provides important social information about users' emotions on specific topics.

These three patterns have several uses beyond pure analysis. For example, influence can be used to determine the most influential user in a particular network. Companies would be interested in this information in order to decide who they may hire for influencer marketing. These influencers are determined by recognition, activity generation, and novelty—three requirements that can be measured through the data mined from these sites. Analysts also value measures of homophily: the tendency of two similar individuals to become friends. Users have begun to rely on information of other users' opinions in order to understand diverse subject matter. These analyses can also help create recommendations for individuals in a tailored capacity. By measuring influence and homophily, online and offline companies are able to suggest specific products for individuals consumers, and groups of consumers. Social media networks can use this information themselves to suggest to their users possible friends to add, pages to follow, and accounts to interact with.

== Perception ==
Modern social media mining is a controversial practice that has led to exponential gains in user growth for tech giants such as Facebook, Inc., Twitter, and Google. Companies such as these, considered "Big Tech" are companies that build algorithms that take advantage of user input to understand their preferences, and keep them on the platform as much as possible. These inputs, that can be as simple as time spent on a given screen, provide the data being mined, and lead to companies profiting heavily from using that data to capitalize on extremely accurate predictions about user behavior. The growth of platforms accelerated rapidly once these strategies were put in place; Most of the largest platforms now average over 1 billion active users per month as of 2021.

It has been claimed by a multitude of anti-algorithm personalities, like Tristan Harris or Chamath Palihapitiya, that certain companies (specifically Facebook) valued growth above all else, and ignored potential negative impacts from these growth engineering tactics.

At the same time, users have now created their own data arbitrages with the help of their own data, through content monetization and becoming influencers. Users typically have access to a varied set of analytics specific to people that interact with them on social media, and can use these as building blocks for their own targeting and growth strategies through ads and posts that cater to their audiences. Influencers also commonly promote products and services for established brands, creating one of the largest digital industries: Influencer marketing. Instagram, Facebook, Twitter, YouTube, Google, and others have long given access to platform analytics, and allowed third parties to access that information as well, at times unbeknownst to even the user whose data is being viewed/bought.

== Research ==
=== Research areas ===
- Social media event detection – Social networks enable users to freely communicate with each other and share their recent news, ongoing activities or views about different topics. As a result, they can be seen as a potentially viable source of information to understand the current emerging topics/events.
- Public health monitoring and surveillance - Using large-scale analysis of social media to study large cohorts of patients and the general public, e.g. to obtain early warning signals of drug-drug interactions and adverse drug reactions, or understand human reproduction and sexual interest.
- Community structure (Community Detection/Evolution/Evaluation) – Identifying communities on social networks, how they evolve, and evaluating identified communities, often without ground truth.
- Network measures – Measuring centrality, transitivity, reciprocity, balance, status, and similarity in social media.
- Network models – Simulate networks with specific characteristics. Examples include random graphs (E-R models), Preferential attachment models, and small-world models.
- Information cascade – Analyzing how information propagates in social media sites. Examples include herd behavior, information cascades, diffusion of innovations, and epidemic models.
- Influence and homophily – Measuring network assortativity and measuring and modeling influence and homophily.
- Recommendation in social media – recommending friends or items on social media sites.
- Social search – Searching for information on the social web.
- Sentiment analysis in social media – Identifying collectively subjective information, e.g. positive and negative, from social media data.
- Social spammer detection – Detecting social spammers who send out unwanted spam content appearing on social networks and any website with user-generated content to targeted users, often corroborating to boost their social influence, legitimacy, credibility.
- Feature selection with social media data – Transforming feature selection to harness the power of social media.
- Trust in social media – Studying and understanding of trust in social media.
- Distrust and negative links – Exploring negative links in social media.
- Role of social media in crises – Social media is continuing to play an important role during crises, particularly Twitter. Studies show that it is possible to detect earthquakes and rumors using tweets published during crisis. Developing tools to help first responders to analyze tweets towards better crisis response and developing techniques to provide them faster access to relevant tweets is an active area of research.
- Location-based social network mining – Mining Human Mobility for Personalized POI Recommendation on Location-based Social Networks.
- Provenance of information in social media – Provenance informs a user about the sources of a given piece of information. Social media can help in identifying the provenance of information due its unique features: user-generated content, user profiles, user interactions, and spatial or temporal information.
- Vulnerability management – A user's vulnerability on a social networking sites can be managed in three sequential steps: (1) identifying new ways in which a user can be vulnerable, (2) quantifying or measuring a user's vulnerability, and (3) reducing or mitigating them.
- Opinion mining on candidates/parties - Social media is a popular medium for candidates/parties to campaign and for gauging the public reaction to the campaigns. Social media can also be used as an indicator of the voters' opinion. Some research studies have shown that predictions made using social media posts can match (or even improve) traditional opinion polls.

=== Publication venues ===
Social media mining research articles are published in computer science, social science, and data mining conferences and journals:

==== Conferences ====
Conference papers can be found in proceedings of Knowledge Discovery and Data Mining (KDD), World Wide Web (WWW), Association for Computational Linguistics (ACL), Conference on Information and Knowledge Management (CIKM), International Conference on Data Mining (ICDM), Internet Measuring Conference (IMC).

- KDD Conference – ACM SIGKDD Conference on Knowledge Discovery and Data Mining
- WWW Conference – International World Wide Web Conference
- WSDM Conference – ACM Conference on Web Search and Data Mining
- CIKM Conference – ACM Conference on Information and Knowledge Management
- ICDM Conference – IEEE International Conference on Data Mining
- Association for Computational Linguistics (ACL)
- ASONAM conference - IEEE/ACM International Conference on Advances in Social Networks Analysis and Mining
- Internet Measuring Conference (IMC)
- International Conference on Web and Social Media (ICWSM)
- International Conference on Social Media & Society
- International Conference on Web Engineering (ICWE)
- The European Conference on Machine Learning and Principles and Practice of Knowledge Discovery in Databases(ECML/PKDD),
- International Joint Conferences on Artificial Intelligence (IJCAI),
- Association for the Advancement of Artificial Intelligence (AAAI),
- Recommender Systems (RecSys)
- Computer-Human Interaction (CHI)
- Social Computing Behavioral-Cultural Modeling and Prediction (SBP).
- HT Conference – ACM Conference on Hypertext
- SDM Conference – SIAM International Conference on Data Mining (SIAM)
- PAKDD Conference – The annual Pacific-Asia Conference on Knowledge Discovery and Data Mining
- MISNC - Multidisciplinary International Social Networks Conference

==== Journals ====
- DMKD Conference – Research Issues on Data Mining and Knowledge Discovery
- ECML-PKDD Conference – European Conference on Machine Learning and Principles and Practice of Knowledge Discovery in Databases
- ACM Transactions on Intelligent Systems and Technology (TIST)
- ACM Transactions on Knowledge Discovery from Data (TKDD)
- ACM Transactions on the Web (TWEB)
- IEEE Transactions on Knowledge and Data Engineering (TKDE),
- IEEE Intelligent Systems
- Internet Mathematics
- International Journal of Social Network Mining (IJSNM)
- Knowledge and Information Systems (KAIS)
- World Wide Web Journal
- Social Network Analysis and Mining (SNAM)
- Social Networks
- SIGKDD Exploration

Social media mining is also present on many data management/database conferences such as the ICDE Conference, SIGMOD Conference and International Conference on Very Large Data Bases.

== See also ==
Methods

- Social media measurement
- Text mining

Application domains

- Web mining
- Twitter mining

Companies

- NUVI

Related topics

- Social media
- Profiling (information science)
- Web scraping
- GDPR
