= Social media =

Virtual online communities

Various social media platforms

Social media are new media technologies that facilitate the creation, sharing and aggregation of content (such as ideas, interests, and other forms of expression) amongst virtual communities and networks. Common features include:

- Online platforms enable users to create and share content and participate in social networking.
- User-generated content such as text posts or comments, digital photos or videos, and data generated through online interactions.
- Service specific profiles that are designed and maintained by the social media organization.
- Social media helps the development of online social networks by connecting a user's profile with those of other individuals or groups.

The term social in regard to media suggests platforms enable communal activity. Social media helps people connect and build networks. Users access social media through web-based or mobile applications. These interactive platforms allow individuals, communities, businesses, and organizations to share, co-create, discuss, participate in, and modify user-generated or self-curated content. Social media is used to share memories, form friendships, build communities and learn. They may be used to promote people, companies, products, and ideas. Social media can be used to consume, publish, or share news.

Popular social media platforms with over 100 million registered users include X, Facebook, WeChat, ShareChat, Instagram, Pinterest, QZone, Weibo, VK, Tumblr, Baidu Tieba, Threads, and LinkedIn. Depending on the interpretation, other popular platforms that are sometimes referred to as social media services include YouTube, Letterboxd, QQ, Telegram, WhatsApp, Signal, LINE, Snapchat, Viber, Reddit, Discord, and TikTok. Wikis and Roblox are examples of collaborative content creation.

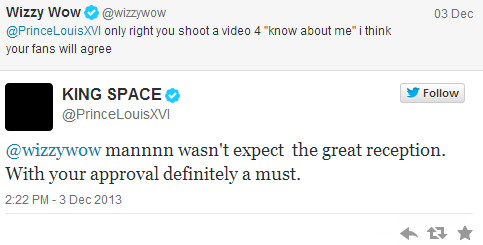
Users interacting conversationally on Twitter, prior to it becoming X

Social media outlets differ from old media (e.g. newspapers, TV, and radio broadcasting) in many ways, including quality, reach, frequency, usability, relevancy, and permanence. Social media outlets operate in a dialogic transmission system (many sources to many receivers) while traditional media operate under a monologic transmission model (one source to many receivers). For instance, a newspaper is delivered to many subscribers, and a radio station broadcasts the same programs to a city.

Social media has been criticized for a range of negative impacts on children and teenagers, including exposure to inappropriate content, exploitation by adults, sleep problems, attention problems, feelings of exclusion, and various mental health maladies. Social media has also received criticism as worsening political polarization and undermining democracy, exacerbated by platform capture by vested interests, with journalist Maria Ressa deeming it "toxic sludge" for increasing distrust among members of society. During the 2020s, concerns have emerged over the risk posed by the large influence of social media platforms based in the United States to the sovereignty of countries in Europe, South America and Australasia.

Major news outlets across the world often have strong controls in place to avoid and fix false claims, but social media's unique qualities bring viral content with little to no oversight. According to the American Psychological Association, "Algorithms that track user engagement to prioritize what is shown tend to favor content that spurs negative emotions like anger and outrage. Overall, most online misinformation originates from a small minority of "superspreaders," but social media amplifies their reach and influence."

== History ==
=== Early computing ===
The PLATO system was launched in 1960 at the University of Illinois and subsequently commercially marketed by Control Data Corporation. It offered early forms of social media features with innovations such as Notes, PLATO's message-forum application; TERM-talk, its instant-messaging feature; Talkomatic, perhaps the first online chat room; News Report, a crowdsourced online newspaper, and blog and Access Lists, enabling the owner of a note file or other application to limit access to a certain set of users, for example, only friends, classmates, or co-workers.

ARPANET, which came online in 1969, had expanded by the late 1970s to allow users to exchange and communicate ideas outside of government/business, as evidenced by the network etiquette (or "netiquette") described in a 1982 handbook on computing at MIT's Artificial Intelligence Laboratory. ARPANET evolved into the Internet in the 1990s. Usenet, conceived by Tom Truscott and Jim Ellis in 1979 at the University of North Carolina at Chapel Hill and Duke University, was the first open social media app, established in 1980.

A precursor of the electronic bulletin board system (BBS), known as Community Memory, appeared by 1973. Mainstream BBSs arrived with the Computer Bulletin Board System in Chicago, which launched on February 16, 1978. Before long, most major US cities had more than one BBS, running on TRS-80, Apple II, Atari 8-bit computers, IBM PC, Commodore 64, Sinclair, and others. CompuServe, Prodigy, and AOL were three of the largest BBS companies and were the first to migrate to the Internet in the 1990s. Between the mid-1980s and the mid-1990s, BBSes numbered in the tens of thousands in North America alone. Message forums were the signature BBS phenomenon throughout the 1980s and early 1990s.

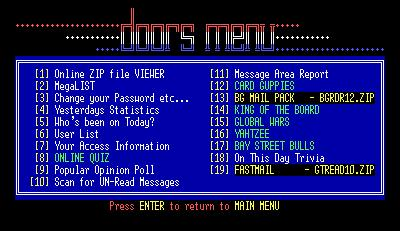
A bulletin board system menu, featuring opinion polls and a "Who's been on today?" query

In 1991, Tim Berners-Lee integrated HTML hypertext software with the Internet, creating the World Wide Web. This breakthrough led to an explosion of blogs, list servers, and email services. Message forums migrated to the web, and evolved into Internet forums, supported by cheaper access as well as the ability to handle far more people simultaneously.

These early text-based systems expanded to include images and video in the 21st century, aided by digital cameras and camera phones.

=== Social media platforms ===
SixDegrees, launched in 1997, is often regarded as the first social media site.

The evolution of online services progressed from serving as channels for networked communication to becoming interactive platforms for networked social interaction with the advent of Web 2.0.

Social media started in the mid-1990s with the invention of platforms like Classmates.com, and SixDegrees.com. While instant messaging and chat clients existed at the time, SixDegrees was unique as it was the first online service designed for people to connect using their actual names instead of anonymously. It boasted features like profiles, friends lists, and school affiliations, making it "the very first social networking site". The platform's name was inspired by the "six degrees of separation" concept, which suggests that every person on the planet is just six connections away from everyone else.

In the early 2000s, social media platforms gained widespread popularity with BlackPlanet (1999) preceding Friendster and Myspace, followed by Facebook, YouTube, and Twitter.

Research from 2015 reported that globally, users spent 22% of their online time on social networks, likely fueled by the availability of smartphones. As of 2023, as many as 4.76 billion people used social media some 59% of the global population.

== Definition ==
A 2015 review identified four features unique to social media services:

- Web 2.0 Internet-based applications.
- User-generated content
- User-created self profiles
- Social networks formed by connections between profiles, such as followers, groups, and lists.

In 2019, Merriam-Webster defined social media as "forms of electronic communication (such as websites for social networking and microblogging) through which users create online communities to share information, ideas, personal messages, and other content (such as videos)."

The American National Institute of Standards and Technology defines it as "Forms of electronic communications, including websites and applications, that enable users to create and share content or to participate in social networking."

== Services ==
Social media encompasses an expanding suite of services:

- Blogs (ex. HuffPost, Boing Boing)
- Business networks (ex. LinkedIn, XING)
- Collaborative projects (Mozilla, GitHub)
- Enterprise social networks (Yammer, Socialcast, Slack)
- Forums (Gaia Online, IGN)
- Microblogs (Twitter, Tumblr, Weibo)
- Photo sharing (Pinterest, Flickr, Photobucket)
- Products/services review (Amazon, Upwork)
- Social bookmarking (Delicious, Pinterest)
- Social gaming including MMORPGs (Fortnite, World of Warcraft)
- Social network (Facebook, Instagram, Baidu Tieba, VK, QZone, ShareChat, WeChat, LINE)
- Video sharing (YouTube, DailyMotion, Vimeo)
- Virtual worlds (Second Life, Twinity)

Some services offer more than one type of service.

== Mobile social media ==
Mobile social media refers to the use of social media on mobile devices such as smartphones and tablets. It is distinguished by its ubiquity, since users no longer have to be at a desk in order to participate on a computer. Mobile services can use the user's location to offer information, connections, or services relevant to that location.

According to Andreas Kaplan, mobile social media activities fall among four types:

- Space-timers (location and time-sensitive): Exchange of messages with relevance for a specific location at a specific point in time (posting about a traffic jam)
- Space-locators (only location sensitive): Posts/messages with relevance for a specific location, read later by others (e.g. a restaurant review)
- Quick-timers (only time sensitive): Transfer of traditional social media mobile apps to increase immediacy (e.g. posting status updates)
- Slow-timers (neither location nor time sensitive): Transfer of traditional social media applications to mobile devices (e.g. watching a video)

== Elements and function ==
=== Virality ===
Certain content, has the potential to spread virally, an analogy for the way viral infections spread contagiously from individual to individual. Viral videos are one example. One user spreads a post across their network, which leads those users to follow suit. A post from a relatively unknown user can reach vast numbers of people within hours. Recommendation algorithms also influence how widely social media content is seen. These systems use information about users' previous interactions to recommend and rank content in personalized feeds, affecting which posts users encounter.

Viral marketing campaigns are particularly attractive to businesses because they can achieve widespread advertising coverage at a fraction of the cost of traditional marketing campaigns. Nonprofit organizations and activists may also attempt to spread content virally.

Social media sites provide specific functionality to help users re-share content, such as X's and Facebook's "like" option.

==== Bots ====
Bots are automated programs that operate on the internet. They automate many communication tasks. This has led to the creation of an industry of bot providers.

Chatbots and social bots are programmed to mimic human interactions such as liking, commenting, and following. Bots have also been developed to facilitate social media marketing. Bots have led the marketing industry into an analytical crisis, as bots make it difficult to differentiate between human interactions and bot interactions. Some bots violate platforms' terms of use, which can result in bans and campaigns to eliminate bots categorically. Bots may even pose as real people to avoid prohibitions.

'Cyborgs'—either bot-assisted humans or human-assisted bots—are used for both legitimate and illegitimate purposes, from spreading fake news to creating marketing buzz. A human writes a post content and the bot posts it a specific time. In other cases, cyborgs spread fake news. Cyborgs may work as sock puppets, where one human pretends to be someone else, or operates multiple accounts, each pretending to be a person.

==== Patents ====
A multitude of United States patents are related to social media, and their numbers are growing, albeit unevenly. For example, there were 897 patents in Q3 2024 and 1,674 in Q2. And even in Q3, the U.S. share of all social media patent applications was 50% of all patent applications, with second-placed China at 18%. As of 2020, over 5000 social media patent applications had been published in the United States. Only slightly over 100 patents had been issued.

=== Platform convergence ===
As an instance of technological convergence, various social media platforms adapted functionality beyond their original scope, increasingly overlapping with each other.

Examples are the social hub site Facebook launching an integrated video platform in May 2007, and Instagram, whose original scope was low-resolution photo sharing, introducing the ability to share quarter-minute 640×640 pixel videos (later extended to a minute with increased resolution). Instagram later implemented stories (short videos self-destructing after 24 hours), a concept popularized by Snapchat, as well as IGTV, for seekable videos. Stories were then adopted by YouTube.

X, whose original scope was text-based microblogging, later adopted photo sharing, then video sharing, then a media studio for business users, after YouTube's Creator Studio.

The discussion platform Reddit added an integrated image hoster replacing the external image sharing platform Imgur, and then an internal video hosting service, followed by image galleries (multiple images in a single post), known from Imgur. Imgur implemented video sharing.

YouTube rolled out a Community feature, for sharing text-only posts and polls.

== Usage statistics ==
According to Statista, it is estimated that, in 2022, around 3.96 billion people were using social media globally. According to the Digital 2026 Global Overview Report, there were approximately 5.66 billion active social media user identities worldwide in October 2025, equivalent to 68.7% of the global population. This estimate does not necessarily represent unique individuals.

The following is a list of the most popular social networking services based on the number of active users as of January 2024 per Statista.

Social networking services with the most users, January 2024
#	Network	Number of users (millions)	Country of origin
1	Facebook	3,049	United States
2	YouTube	2,491	United States
3	WhatsApp	2,000	United States
4	Instagram	2,000	United States
5	TikTok	1,526	China
6	WeChat	1,336	China
7	Facebook Messenger	979	United States
8	Telegram	800	Russia
9	Douyin	752	China
10	Snapchat	750	United States
11	Kuaishou	685	China
12	Twitter/X	619	United States

=== Usage: before the pandemic ===
A 2009 study suggested that individual differences may help explain who uses social media: extraversion and openness have a positive relationship with social media, while emotional stability has a negative sloping relationship with social media. A 2015 study reported that people with a higher social comparison orientation appear to use social media more heavily than people with low social comparison orientation.

Common Sense Media reported that children under age 13 in the United States use social networking services although many social media sites require users to be 13 or older. In 2017, the firm conducted a survey of parents of children from birth to age 8 and reported that 4% of children at this age used social media sites such as Instagram, Snapchat, or (now-defunct) Musical.ly "often" or "sometimes". Their 2019 survey surveyed Americans ages 8–16 and reported that about 31% of children ages 8–12 use social media. In that survey, teens aged 16–18 were asked when they started using social media. the median age was 14, although 28% said they started to use it before reaching 13.

=== Usage: during the pandemic ===
==== Usage by minors ====
Social media played a role in communication during the COVID-19 pandemic. In June 2020, a survey by Cartoon Network and the Cyberbullying Research Center surveyed Americans tweens (ages 9–12) and reported that the most popular application was YouTube (67%). (as age increased, tweens were more likely to have used social media apps and games.) Similarly, Common Sense Media's 2020 survey of Americans ages 13–18 reported that YouTube was the most popular (used by 86% of 13- to 18-year-olds). As children aged, they increasingly utilized social media services and often used YouTube to consume content. A 2025 Pew Research Center survey found that approximately nine in ten American teenagers aged 13–17 used YouTube, while around six in ten used TikTok and Instagram. The survey also found that 36% of teenagers reported using at least one of five major social media platforms almost constantly.

Apps used by U.S. tweens (ages 9–12), 2019–2020
Platform	Overall	Boys	Girls	9-year-olds	12-year-olds
YouTube	67%	68%	66%	53.6%	74.6%
Minecraft	48%	61%	35%	43.6%	49.9%
Roblox	47%	44%	49%	41.2%	41.7%
Google Classroom	45%	48%	41%	39.6%	49.3%
Fortnite	31%	43%	20%	22.2%	38.9%
TikTok	30%	23%	30%	16.8%	37%
YouTube Kids	26%	24%	28%	32.7%	22.1%
Snapchat	16%	11%	21%	5.6%	22.3%
Facebook Messenger Kids	15%	12%	18%	19.1%	10.4%
Instagram	15%	12%	19%	3%	28.8%
Discord	8%	11%	5%	0.7%	14.4%
Facebook	8%	6%	9%	2.2%	15%
Twitch	5%	7%	2%	1.0%	9.9%
None of the above	5%	6%	5%	9.6%	3.3%

Social media platforms used by U.S. kids in 2020 (ages 13–18) and 2017 (ages 10–18)
Platform	2020	2017
YouTube	86%	70%
Instagram	69%	60%
Snapchat	68%	59%
TikTok	47%	N/A
Facebook	43%	63%
Twitter/X	28%	36%
Reddit	14%	6%
Another social networking service	2%	3%
Do not use social networking service	4%	6%

==== Reasons for use by adults ====
While adults were using social media before the COVID-19 pandemic, more started using it to stay socially connected and to get pandemic updates.

"Social media have become popularly use to seek for medical information and have fascinated the general public to collect information regarding corona virus pandemics in various perspectives. During these days, people are forced to stay at home and the social media have connected and supported awareness and pandemic updates."

Healthcare workers and systems became more aware of social media as a place people were getting health information:

"During the COVID-19 pandemic, social media use has accelerated to the point of becoming a ubiquitous part of modern healthcare systems."

This also led to the spread of disinformation. On December 11, 2020, the CDC put out a "Call to Action: Managing the Infodemic". Some healthcare organizations used hashtags as interventions and published articles on their Twitter data:

"Promotion of the joint usage of #PedsICU and #COVID19 throughout the international pediatric critical care community in tweets relevant to the coronavirus disease 2019 pandemic and pediatric critical care."

However others in the medical community were concerned about social media addiction, as it became an increasingly important context and therefore "source of social validation and reinforcement" and were unsure whether increased social media use was harmful.

== Use by organizations ==
=== Government ===
Governments may use social media to (for example):

- inform their opinions to public
- interact with citizens
- foster citizen participation
- further open government
- analyze/monitor public opinion and activities
- educate the public about risks and public health.

==== Law enforcement ====
Social media has been used extensively in civil and criminal investigations. It has also been used to search for missing persons. Police departments often make use of official social media accounts to engage with the public, publicize police activity, and burnish law enforcement's image; conversely, video footage of citizen-documented police brutality and other misconduct has sometimes been posted to social media.

In the United States, U.S. Immigration and Customs Enforcement identifies and track individuals via social media, and has apprehended some people via social media-based sting operations. U.S. Customs and Border Protection (also known as CBP) and the United States Department of Homeland Security use social media data as influencing factors during the visa process, and monitor individuals after they have entered the country. CBP officers have also been documented performing searches of electronics and social media behavior at the border, searching both citizens and non-citizens without first obtaining a warrant.

==== Reputation management ====
As social media gained momentum among the younger generations, governments began using it to improve their image, especially among the youth. In January 2021, Egyptian authorities were reported to be using Instagram influencers as part of its media ambassadors program. The program was designed to revamp Egypt's image and to counter the bad press Egypt had received because of the country's human rights record. Saudi Arabia and the United Arab Emirates participated in similar programs. Similarly, Dubai has extensively relied on social media and influencers to promote tourism. However, Dubai laws have kept these influencers within limits to not offend the authorities, or to criticize the city, politics or religion. The content of these foreign influencers is controlled to make sure that nothing portrays Dubai in a negative light.

=== Business ===
Many businesses use social media for marketing, branding, advertising, communication, sales promotions, informal employee-learning/organizational development, competitive analysis, recruiting, relationship management/loyalty programs, and e-Commerce. Companies use social-media monitoring tools to monitor, track, and analyze conversations to aid in their marketing, sales and other programs. Tools range from free, basic applications to subscription-based, tools. Social media offers information on industry trends. Within the finance industry, companies use social media as a tool for analyzing market sentiment. These range from marketing financial products, market trends, and as a tool to identify insider trading. To exploit these opportunities, businesses need guidelines for use on each platform.

Business use of social media is complicated by the fact that the business does not fully control its social media presence. Instead, it makes its case by participating in the "conversation". Business uses social media on a customer-organizational level; and an intra-organizational level.

Social media can encourage entrepreneurship and innovation, by highlighting successes, and by easing access to resources that might not otherwise be readily available/known.

==== Marketing ====
Social media marketing can help promote a product or service and establish connections with customers. Social media marketing can be divided into paid media, earned media, and owned media. Using paid social media firms run advertising on a social media platform. Earned social media appears when firms do something that impresses stakeholders and they spontaneously post content about it. Owned social media is the platform markets itself by creating/promoting content to its users.

Primary uses are to create brand awareness, engage customers by conversation (e.g., customers provide feedback on the firm) and providing access to customer service. Social media's peer-to-peer communication shifts power from the organization to consumers, since consumer content is widely visible and not controlled by the company.

Social media personalities, often referred to as "influencers", are Internet celebrities who are sponsored by marketers to promote products and companies online. Research reports that these endorsements attract the attention of users who have not settled on which products/services to buy, especially younger consumers. The practice of harnessing influencers to market or promote a product or service to their following is commonly referred to as influencer marketing.

In 2013, the United Kingdom Advertising Standards Authority (ASA) began advising celebrities to make it clear whether they had been paid to recommend a product or service by using the hashtag #spon or #ad when endorsing. The US Federal Trade Commission issued similar guidelines.

Social media platforms also enable targeting specific audiences with advertising. Users of social media can share, and comment on the advertisement, turning passive consumers into active promoters and even producers. Targeting requires extra effort by advertisers to understand how to reach the right users. Companies can use humor (such as shitposting) to poke fun at competitors. Advertising can even inspire fanart which can engage new audiences. Hashtags (such as #ejuice and #eliquid) are one way to target interested users.

User content can trigger peer effects, increasing consumer interest even without influencer involvement. A 2012 study focused on this communication reported that communication among peers can affect purchase intentions: direct impact through encouraging conformity, and an indirect impact by increasing product engagement. This study claimed that peer communication about a product increased product engagement.

=== Politics ===
Social media have a range of uses in politics. Politicians use social media to spread their messages and influence voters.

Dounoucos et al. reported that Twitter use by candidates was unprecedented during the US 2016 election. The public increased its reliance on social-media sites for political information. In the European Union, social media amplified political messages. Foreign-originated social-media campaigns attempt to influence political opinion in another country.

==== Activism ====
Social media was influential in the Arab Spring in 2011. However, debate persists about the extent to which social media facilitated this. Activists have used social media to report the abuse of human rights in Bahrain. They publicized the brutality of government authorities, who they claimed were detaining, torturing and threatening individuals. Conversely, Bahrain's government used social media to track and target activists. The government stripped citizenship from over 1,000 activists as punishment.

Militant groups use social media as an organizing and recruiting tool. Islamic State (also known as ISIS) used social media. In 2014, #AllEyesonISIS went viral on Arabic X.

==== Propaganda ====
Internet manipulation and propaganda has been sponsored by sovereign states to influence elections, sow distrust in institutions, and spread rumors and disinformation, typically using bots, troll farms, or influencers to create and spread content, particularly via social media. Propaganda is used internally to control populations, and externally to influence other societies. The term foreign information manipulation and interference (FIMI) is also used, particularly by the European Union, for state-sponsored Internet propaganda.

=== Recruiting ===
Social media use in hiring refers to the examination by employers of job applicants' (public) social media profiles as part of the hiring assessment. For example, the vast majority of Fortune 500 companies use social media as a tool to screen prospective employees and as a tool for talent acquisition.

This practice raises ethical questions. Employers and recruiters note that they have access only to information that applicants choose to make public. Many Western-European countries restrict employer's use of social media in the workplace. States including Arkansas, California, Colorado, Illinois, Maryland, Michigan, Nevada, New Jersey, New Mexico, Utah, Washington, and Wisconsin protect applicants and employees from surrendering usernames and passwords for social media accounts. Use of social media has caused significant problems for some applicants who are active on social media. A 2013 survey of 17,000 young people in six countries found that one in ten people aged 16 to 34 claimed to have been rejected for a job because of social media activity.

Social media services have been reported to affect deception in resumes. While these services do not affect deception frequency, it does increase deception about interests and hobbies.

=== Science ===
Scientists use social media to share their scientific knowledge and research on platforms such as ResearchGate, LinkedIn, Facebook, X, and Academia.edu. The most common platforms are X and blogs. The use of social media reportedly has improved the interaction between scientists, reporters, and the general public. Over 495,000 opinions were shared on X related to science between September 1, 2010, and August 31, 2011. Science related blogs respond to and motivate public interest in learning, following, and discussing science. Posts can be written quickly and allow the reader to interact in real time with authors. One study in the context of climate change reported that climate scientists and scientific institutions played a minimal role in online debate, exceeded by nongovernmental organizations.

=== Academia ===
Academicians use social media activity to assess academic publications, to measure public sentiment, identify influencer accounts, or crowdsource ideas or solutions. Social media such as Facebook, X are also combined to predict elections via sentiment analysis. Additional social media (e.g. YouTube, Google Trends) can be combined to reach a wider segment of the voting population, minimise media-specific bias, and inexpensively estimate electoral predictions which are on average half of a percentage point off the real vote share.

=== School admissions ===
In some places, students have been forced to surrender their social media passwords to school administrators. Few laws protect student's social media privacy. Organizations such as the ACLU call for more privacy protection. They urge students who are pressured to give up their account information to resist.

Colleges and universities may access applicants' internet services including social media profiles as part of their admissions process. According to Kaplan, Inc, a corporation that provides higher education preparation, in 2012 27% of admissions officers used Google to learn more about an applicant, with 26% checking Facebook. Students whose social media pages include questionable material may be disqualified from admission processes.

"One survey in July 2017, by the American Association of College Registrars and Admissions Officers, reported that 11 percent of respondents said they had refused to admit an applicant based on social media content. This includes 8 percent of public institutions, where the First Amendment applies. The survey reported that 30 percent of institutions acknowledged reviewing the personal social media accounts of applicants at least some of the time."

=== Court cases ===
Social media comments and images have been used in court cases including employment law, child custody/child support, and disability claims. After an Apple employee criticized his employer on Facebook, he was fired. When the former employee sued Apple for unfair dismissal, the court, after examining the employee's Facebook posts, reported in favor of Apple, stating that the posts breached Apple's policies. After a couple broke up, the man posted song lyrics "that talked about fantasies of killing the rapper's ex-wife" and made threats. A court reported him guilty. In a disability claims case, a woman who fell at work claimed that she was permanently injured; the employer used her social media posts to counter her claims.

Courts do not always admit social media evidence, in part, because screenshots can be faked or tampered with. Judges may consider emojis into account to assess statements made on social media; in one Michigan case where a person alleged that another person had defamed them in an online comment, the judge disagreed, noting that an emoji after the comment that indicated that it was a joke. In a 2014 case in Ontario against a police officer regarding alleged assault of a protester during the G20 summit, the court rejected the Crown's application to use a digital photo of the protest that was anonymously posted online, because it included no metadata verifying its provenance.

On April 9, 2024, the Spirit Lake Tribe in North Dakota and Menominee Indian Tribe of Wisconsin have sued social media companies (Meta Platforms-Facebook, Instagram; Snapchat, TikTok, YouTube, and Google) companies accused of 'deliberate misconduct'. Their lawsuit describes "a sophisticated and intentional effort that has caused a continuing, substantial, and longterm burden to the Tribe and its members," leaving scarce resources for education, cultural preservation and other social programs. These social media lawsuits are one of several legal actions brought against social media giants. Independently, 33 state attorneys general, including South Dakota's, sued the same defendants for targeting teens with allegedly poor content, they allege. The defendants have said they are launching new safety tools and features to protect younger users. As of 2025, eight US states (Arkansas, California, Florida, Georgia, Louisiana, Mississippi, Ohio, and Tennessee) have enacted legislation that either bans minors from obtaining social media accounts outright or requires minors of certain ages to obtain parental consent in order to open accounts.

== Use by individuals ==
=== News source ===
"News at your fingertips" Social media is where the world stays connected.

Social media as a news source is defined as the use of online social media platforms such as Instagram, TikTok, and Facebook rather than the use of traditional media platforms like the newspaper or live TV to obtain news. Television had just begun to turn a nation of people who once listened to media content into watchers of media content between the 1950s and the 1980s when the popularity of social media had also begun creating a nation of media content creators. Almost half of Americans use social media as a news source, according to the Pew Research Center. Social media has changed the way individuals access news in real time and on personal interest. As social media's role in news consumption grows, questions have emerged about its impact on knowledge, the formation of echo chambers, and the effectiveness of fact-checking efforts in combating misinformation. News reporting had to be a specialized field, reporters had to be writers and researchers to discover accurate information for it to be released to the public. Reporting is no longer just for a professional journalist, even someone who happens to be walking nearby can become the reporter.Many newspaper and live TV companies tried to get people to sign up for their online news subscription with a monthly or yearly fee. Consumers were not interested in purchasing these subscriptions due to social media platforms.In Joshua Benton's questioner it showed that 71% would not be interested in any of these options.

Social media platforms allow user-generated content and sharing content within one's own virtual network. Using social media as a news source allows users to engage with news in a variety of ways including:

- Consuming and discovering news
- Sharing or reposting news
- Posting one's own photos, videos, or reports of news (i.e., engage in citizen or participatory journalism)
- Commenting on news posts

In 2019, the Pew Research Center created a poll that reported Americans are wary about the ways that social media sites share news and certain content. This wariness of accuracy grew as awareness that social media sites could be exploited by bad actors who concoct false narratives and fake news.

=== Social tool ===
Social media are used to socialize with friends and family pursue romance and flirt, but not all social needs can be fulfilled by social media. For example, a 2003 article reported that lonely individuals are more likely to use the Internet for emotional support than others. A 2018 survey from Common Sense Media reported that 40% of American teens ages 13–17 thought that social media was "extremely" or "very" important for them to connect with their friends. The same survey reported that 33% of teens said social media was extremely or very important to conduct meaningful conversations with close friends, and 23% of teens said social media was extremely or very important to document and share their lives. A 2020 Gallup poll reported that 53% of adult social media users in the United States thought that social media was a very or moderately important way to keep in touch with people during the COVID-19 pandemic.

In Alone Together Sherry Turkle considered how people confuse social media usage with authentic communication. She claimed that people act differently online and are less concerned about hurting others' feelings. Some online encounters can cause stress and anxiety, due to the difficulty purging online posts, fear of getting hacked, or of universities and employers exploring social media pages. Turkle speculated that many people prefer texting to face-to-face communication, which can contribute to loneliness. Surveys from 2019 reported evidence among teens in the United States and Mexico. Some researchers reported that exchanges that involved direct communication and reciprocal messages correlated with less loneliness.

In social media "stalking" or "creeping" refers to looking at someone's "timeline, status updates, tweets, and online bios" to find information about them and their activities. A sub-category of creeping is creeping ex-partners after a breakup.

Catfishing (creating a false identity) allows bad actors to exploit the lonely.

== Issues ==
=== Invidious comparison ===
Self-presentation theory proposes that people consciously manage their self-image or identity related information in social contexts. One aspect of social media is the time invested in customizing a personal profile. Some users segment their audiences based on the image they want to present, and the use of multiple pseudonymous accounts on the same platform offers that opportunity.

A 2016 study reported that teenage girls manipulate their self-presentation on social media to appear beautiful as viewed by their peers. Teenage girls attempt to earn regard and acceptance (likes, comments, and shares). When this does not go well, self-confidence and self-satisfaction can decline. A 2018 survey of American teens ages 13–17 by Common Sense Media reported that 45% said likes are at least somewhat important, and 26% at least somewhat agreed that they feel bad about themselves if nobody responds to their photos. Some evidence suggests that perceived rejection may lead to emotional pain, and could lead some teens to resort to online bullying. According to a 2016 study, users' reward circuits in their brains are more active when their photos are liked by more peers.

A 2016 review concluded that social media can trigger a negative feedback loop of viewing and uploading photos, self-comparison, disappointment, and disordered body perception when social success is not achieved. A 2016 study reported that Pinterest is directly associated with disordered dieting behavior.

People portray themselves on social media in the most appealing way; however, upon seeing one person's curated persona, other people may question why their own lives are not as exciting or fulfilling. A 2017 study reported that problematic social media use (i.e., feeling addicted to social media) was related to lower life satisfaction and self-esteem. Studies have reported that social media comparisons can have dire effects on physical and mental health. In one study, women reported that social media was the most influential source of their body image satisfaction; while men reported them as the second biggest factor. Another study reported that 87% of women and 65% of men compared themselves to others on social media.

While monitoring the lives of celebrities long predates social media, the ease and immediacy of direct comparisons of pictures and stories with one's own may increase their impact.

Efforts to combat such negative effects focused promoting body positivity. In a related study, women aged 18–30 were reported posts that contained side-by-side images of women in the same clothes and setting, but one image was enhanced for Instagram, while the other was an unedited, "realistic" version. Women who participated in this experiment reported a decrease in body dissatisfaction.

=== Health ===
==== Adolescents ====
Social media can offer a support system for adolescent health, because it allows them to mobilize around health issues that they deem relevant. For example, in a clinical study among adolescent patients undergoing obesity treatment, participants' claimed that social media allowed them to access personalized weight-loss content as well as social support among other adolescents with obesity.

While social media can provide health information, it typically has no mechanism for ensuring the quality of that information. The National Eating Disorders Association reported a high correlation between weight loss content and disorderly eating among women who have been influenced by inaccurate content. Health literacy offers skills to allow users to spot/avoid such content. Efforts by governments and public health organizations to advance health literacy reportedly achieved limited success. The role of parents and caregivers who proactively approach their children with ongoing guidance and open discussions on the benefits and difficulties they may encounter online, demonstrate some reductions in overall anxiety and depression among adolescents.

Social media such as pro-anorexia sites reportedly increase risk of harm by reinforcing damaging health-related behaviors through social media, especially among adolescents.

==== Pandemic ====
During the coronavirus pandemic, inaccurate information from all sides spread widely via social media. Topics subject to distortion included treatments, avoiding infection, vaccination, and public policy. Simultaneously, governments and others influenced social media platforms to suppress both accurate and inaccurate information in support of public policy. Heavier social media use was reportedly associated with more acceptance of conspiracy theories, leading to worse mental health and less compliance with public health recommendations.

==== Addiction ====
Social media platforms can serve as a breeding ground for addiction-related behaviors, with studies report that excessive use can lead to addiction-like symptoms. These symptoms include compulsive checking, mood modification, and withdrawal when not using social media, which can result in decreased face-to-face social interactions and contribute to the deterioration of interpersonal relationships and a sense of loneliness.

=== Cyberbullying ===
Cyberbullying (cyberharassment or online bullying/harassment) is a form of bullying or harassment using electronic means. Since the 2000s, it has become increasingly common, especially among teenagers and adolescents, due to young people's increased use of social media. Related issues include online/internet harassment and trolling. In 2015, according to cyberbullying statistics from the i-Safe Foundation, over half of adolescents and teens had been bullied online, and about the same number had engaged in cyberbullying. Both the bully and the victim are negatively affected, and the intensity, duration, and frequency of bullying are three aspects that increase the negative effects on both of them.

=== Sleep disturbance ===
A 2017 study reported on a link between sleep disturbance and the use of social media. It concluded that blue light from computer/phone displays—and the frequency rather than the duration of time spent, predicted disturbed sleep, termed "obsessive 'checking'". The association between social media use and sleep disturbance has clinical ramifications for young adults. A recent study reported that people in the highest quartile for weekly social media use experienced the most sleep disturbance. The median number of minutes of social media use per day was 61. Females were more likely to experience high levels of sleep disturbance. Many teenagers suffer from sleep deprivation from long hours at night on their phones, and this left them tired and unfocused in school. A 2011 study reported that time spent on Facebook was negatively associated with GPA, but the association with sleep disturbance was not established.

=== Emotional effects ===
One studied effect of social media is 'Facebook depression', which affects adolescents who spend too much time on social media. This may lead to reclusiveness, which can increase loneliness and low self-esteem. Social media curates content to encourage users to keep scrolling. Studies report children's self-esteem is positively affected by positive comments and negatively affected by negative or lack of comments. This affected self-perception. A 2017 study of almost 6,000 adolescent students reported that those who self-reported addiction-like symptoms of social media use were more likely to report low self-esteem and high levels of depressive symptoms.

A second emotional effect is social media burnout, defined as ambivalence, emotional exhaustion, and depersonalization. Ambivalence is confusion about the benefits from using social media. Emotional exhaustion is stress from using social media. Depersonalization is emotional detachment from social media. The three burnout factors negatively influence the likelihood of continuing on social media.

A third emotional effect is "fear of missing out" (FOMO), which is the "pervasive apprehension that others might be having rewarding experiences from which one is absent." It is associated with increased scrutiny of friends on social media.

Social media can also offer support as Twitter has done for the medical community. X facilitated academic discussion among health professionals and students, while providing a supportive community for these individuals by and allowing members to support each other through likes, comments, and posts. Access to social media offered a way to keep older adults connected, after the deaths of partners and geographical distance between friends and loved ones. In March 2025, a Pakistani man killed a WhatsApp group admin in anger after being removed from the chat.

Since the rise of social media, there have been numerous cases of individuals being influenced towards committing suicide or self-harm through their use of social media, and even of individuals arranging to broadcast suicide attempts, some successful, on social media. The study of the relationship between social media and suicide aims to determine the risks social media poses in terms of suicide, and to identify methods of mitigating such risks.

== Social impacts ==
Media critic Siva Vaidhyanathan refers to social media as 'anti-social media' in reference to its negative impacts including on loneliness and political polarization. Audrey Tang also uses the term antisocial in reference to its impact on democracy.

=== Disparity ===
Digital divide is inequitable access to and use of digital technology, encompassing four interrelated dimensions: motivational, material, skills, and usage access.

The digital divide worsens inequality in access to information and resources.

According to 2026 data from the U.S. Census Bureau, a significant 'digital divide' persists, with over 15.8 million Americans lacking access to high-speed broadband.

Students from low-income households often face limited access to reliable internet and digital devices, which negatively affects their educational opportunities.

In the Information Age, people without access to the Internet and other technology are at a disadvantage, for they are less able to connect with others, find and apply for jobs, shop, and learn.

People living in poverty, in insecure housing or who are homeless, elderly people, and those living in rural communities may have limited access to the Internet; in contrast, urban middle class people have easy access to the Internet. Another divide is between producers and consumers of Internet content, which could be a result of educational disparities. While social media use varies across age groups, a 2010 US study reported no racial divide.

=== Political polarization ===
Many critics point to studies showing social media algorithms elevate more partisan and inflammatory content. Because of recommendation algorithms that filter and display news content that matches users' political preferences, one potential impact is an increase in political polarization due to selective exposure. Political polarization is the divergence of political attitudes towards ideological extremes. Selective exposure occurs when an individual favors information that supports their beliefs and avoids information that conflicts with them. Jonathan Haidt compared the impact of social media to the Tower of Babel and the chaos it unleashed as a result.

Aviv Ovadya argues that these algorithms incentivize the creation of divisive content in addition to promoting existing divisive content, but could be designed to reduce polarization instead. In 2017, Facebook gave its new emoji reactions five times the weight in its algorithms as its like button, which data scientists at the company in 2019 confirmed had disproportionately boosted toxicity, misinformation and low-quality news. Some popular ideas for how to combat selective exposure have had no or opposite impacts. A 2026 pre-registered experiment conducted during the 2019 Argentine presidential election found that, among recruited Twitter users watching a presidential debate, temporarily removing access to Twitter or exposing users to a balanced mix of partisan content did not reduce political polarization and instead produced mild increases; the increases were larger among users in politically segregated online environments. Some advocate for media literacy as a solution. Others argue that less social media, or more local journalism could help address political polarization.

=== Stereotyping ===
A 2018 study reported that social media increases the power of stereotypes. Stereotypes can have both negative and positive connotations. For example, during the COVID-19 pandemic, youth were accused of responsibility for spreading the disease. Elderly people get stereotyped as lacking knowledge of proper behavior on social media. Social media platforms usually amplify these stereotypes by reinforcing age-based biases through certain algorithms as well as user-generated content. Unfortunately, these stereotypes contribute to social divide and negatively impact the way users interact online.

=== Communication ===
Social media allows for mass cultural exchange and intercultural communication, despite different ways of communicating in various cultures.

Social media has affected the way youth communicate, by introducing new forms of language. Novel acronyms save time, as illustrated by "LOL", which is the ubiquitous shortcut for "laugh out loud".

The hashtag was created to simplify searching for information and to allow users to highlight topics of interest in the hope of attracting the attention of others. Hashtags can be used to advocate for a movement, mark content for future use, and allow other users to contribute to a discussion.

For some young people, social media and texting have largely replaced in person communications, made worse by pandemic isolation, delaying the development of conversation and other social skills.

What is socially acceptable is now heavily based on social media. The American Academy of Pediatrics reported that bullying, the making of non-inclusive friend groups, and sexual experimentation have increased cyberbullying, privacy issues, and sending sexual images or messages. Sexting and revenge porn became rampant, particularly among minors, with legal implications and resulting trauma risk. However, adolescents can learn basic social and technical skills online. Social media, can strengthen relationships just by keeping in touch, making more friends, and engaging in community activities.

== Regulation by government authorities ==
=== Situation by geographical region ===
==== Australia ====
In July 2014, in response to WikiLeaks' release of a secret suppression order made by the Victorian Supreme Court, media lawyers were quoted in the Australian media to the effect that "anyone who tweets a link to the WikiLeaks report, posts it on Facebook, or shares it in any way online could also face charges".

In November 2024, the federal government passed the Online Safety Amendment (Social Media Minimum Age) Act 2024 introduced by the Albanese government, banning people under the age of 16 from using most social media platforms, which would come into effect in December 2025. Presented by Minister for Communications Michelle Rowland, the bill was created as an attempt at reducing social media harms for young people and responding to the concerns of parents. The stated penalty for breach of the new laws on the part of social media platforms was a financial penalty of AU$49.5 million. The ban would apply to many major social media platforms, including TikTok, Instagram, Snapchat and Twitter, but would exempt platforms deemed to meet educational or health needs of people under 16, including YouTube and Google Classroom. Supporters of the ban included the advocacy group 36 Months and media corporation News Corp Australia which ran a campaign titled Let Them Be Kids, whilst opposers expressed concern that the ban could cause isolation amongst teenagers belonging to marginalised groups such as the LGBTQ, community or migrant, and culturally diverse backgrounds, and that the ban could stifle creativity and freedom of expression amongst young people.

==== Egypt ====
On 27 July 2020, in Egypt, two women were sentenced to two years of imprisonment for posting TikTok videos, which the government claimed as "violating family values".

==== Thailand ====
In the 2014 Thai coup d'état, the public was explicitly instructed not to 'share' or 'like' dissenting views on social media or face prison.

==== United States ====
Outside of China and Russia, US platforms exert an overwhelming dominance in the global social media space. Under the second presidency of Donald Trump, the US government has heavily pressured foreign governments to prevent regulation of US social media companies and the algorithms they use, with specific examples in Australia, the United Kingdom, and the European Union.

Domestically, platforms have been deemed responsible for moderating the content that they presented. They set rules for what was allowable, decided which content to promote and which to ignore. The US enacted the Communications Decency Act in 1996. Section 230 of that act exempted internet platforms from legal liability for content authored by third parties.

No provider or user of an interactive computer service shall be treated as the publisher or speaker of any information provided by another information content provider." (47 U.S.C. § 230(c)(1)).

— US Congress, Communications Decency Act Section 230

In 2024, legislation was enacted in Florida requiring social media companies to verify the age of people with accounts, and to prohibit holding an account for people aged under 14, and between 14 and 16 in the absence of parental approval.

==== European Union ====
The European Union initially took a similar approach. However, in 2020, the European Commission presented two legislative proposals: The Digital Services Act (DSA) and the Digital Markets Act (DMA). Both proposals were enacted in July 2022. The DSA entered into force on 17 February 2024, the DMA in March 2024. This legislation can be summarized in the following four objectives, articulated by MEPs:

- "What is illegal offline must also be illegal online".
- "Very large online platforms" must therefore, among other things
  - delete illegal content (propaganda, election interference, hate crimes and online harms such as harassment and child abuse) and better protect fundamental rights
  - redesign their systems to ensure a "high level of privacy, security and protection of minors", by prohibiting advertising based on personal data, designing recommender systems to minimize risks for children and demonstrating this to the European Commission via a risk assessment, and
  - not use sensitive personal data such as race, gender and religion to target advertising.

Violators could face a complete ban in Europe or fines of up to 6% of global sales. Such content moderation requires extensive investment by platform providers. Enforcement resources may not be sufficient to ensure compliance.

The DSA allows a country to require information to be deleted that is illegal only in that jurisdiction. According to Patrick Breyer from the German Pirate Party, a problem could arise from the Hungarian government requesting a video to be deleted that is critical of Victor Orban, as he foresaw the potential for such determinations to be applied EU-wide.

=== Discussions and proposals ===
==== General ====
2018 Nobel Laureate Paul Romer advocated taxing negative externalities of social media platforms. Similar to a carbon tax – negative social effects could be compensated for by a financial levy on the platforms. Assuming that the tax did not deter the actions that produced the externalities, the revenue raised could be used to address them. However, consensus has yet to emerge on how to measure or mitigate the harms, nor to craft a tax, .

Another proposal is to invoke competition law. The idea is to restrict the platforms' market power by controlling mergers ex ante and tightening the law. This would be achieved through a supranational enforcement mechanism and the deterrent effect of high fines.

In a 2024 opinion piece, Megan Moreno and Jenny Radesky, professors of pediatrics, wrote about the need for "nuanced" policy. They regarded access which is contingent upon parental consent as harmful. They commented that a focus on increasing age restrictions "may serve to distract from making sure platforms are following guidelines and best practices for all ages".

==== United States ====
In June 2024, US Surgeon General Vivek Murthy called for social media platforms to contain a warning about the impact they have on the mental health of young people.

== Business models ==
The business model of most social media platforms is based on selling slots to advertisers. Platforms provide access to data about each user, which allows them to deliver ads that are individually relevant to them. This strongly incents platforms to arrange their content so that users view as much content as possible, increasing the number of ads that they see. Platforms such as X add paid user subscriptions in part to reduce their dependence on advertising revenues.

Social media platforms can also generate revenue through other business models, including freemium services, affiliate marketing, transaction fees, and the sale of virtual goods. These approaches allow platforms to earn money through different types of user activity and commercial transactions, rather than relying exclusively on advertising or subscriptions.

Some platforms also offer paid memberships and virtual gifts, particularly through livestreaming services. These features allow users to financially support content creators while providing platforms with additional revenue opportunities. A 2024 review of research on social media gifting and paid memberships examined how these monetization features operate and how they affect interactions between platforms, creators, and audiences.

== Criticism, debate and controversy ==
The enormous reach and impact of social media has naturally led to a stream of criticism, debate, and controversy. Criticisms include platform capabilities, content moderation and reliability, impact on concentration, mental health, content ownership, and the meaning of interactions, and poor cross-platform interoperability, decrease in face-to-face interactions, cyberbullying, sexual predation, particularly of children, and child pornography.

In 2007 Andrew Keen wrote, "Out of this anarchy, it suddenly became clear that what was governing the infinite monkeys now inputting away on the Internet was the law of digital Darwinism, the survival of the loudest and most opinionated. Under these rules, the only way to intellectually prevail is by infinite filibustering."

=== Trustworthiness and reliability ===
Social media has become a regular source of news and information. A 2021 Pew Research Center poll reported roughly 70% of users regularly get news from social media, despite the presence of fake news and misinformation. Platforms typically do not take responsibility for content accuracy, and many do not vet content at all, although in some cases, content the platform finds problematic is deleted or access to it is reduced. Content distribution algorithms otherwise typically ignore substance, responding instead to the contents' virality.

In 2018, researchers reported that fake news spread almost 70% faster than truthful news on X. Social media bots on social media increase the reach of both true and false content and if wielded by bad actors misinformation can reach many more users. Some platforms attempt to discover and block bots, with limited success. Fake news seems to receive more user engagement, possibly because it is relatively novel, engaging users' curiosity and increasing spread. Fake news often propagates in the immediate aftermath of an event, before conventional media are prepared to publish.

==== Data harvesting and data mining ====
Social media mining is the process of obtaining data from user-generated content on social media in order to extract actionable patterns, form conclusions about users, and act upon the information. Mining supports targeting advertising to users or academic research. The term is an analogy to the process of mining for minerals. Mining companies sift through raw ore to find the valuable minerals; likewise, social media mining sifts through social media data in order to discern patterns and trends about matters such as social media usage, online behaviour, content sharing, connections between individuals, buying behaviour. These patterns and trends are of interest to companies, governments and not-for-profit organizations, as such organizations can use the analyses for tasks such as design strategies, introduce programs, products, processes or services.

Social media mining uses concepts from computer science, data mining, machine learning, and statistics. Mining is based on social network analysis, network science, sociology, ethnography, optimization and mathematics. It attempts to formally represent, measure and model patterns from social media data. In the 2010s, major corporations, governments and not-for-profit organizations began mining to learn about customers, clients and others.

Platforms such as Google, Facebook (partnered with Datalogix and BlueKai) conduct mining to target users with advertising. Scientists and machine learning researchers extract insights and design product features.

Users may not understand how platforms use their data. Users tend to click through Terms of Use agreements without reading them, leading to ethical questions about whether platforms adequately protect users' privacy.

During the 2016 United States presidential election, Facebook allowed Cambridge Analytica, a political consulting firm linked to the Trump campaign, to analyze the data of an estimated 87 million Facebook users to profile voters, creating controversy when this was revealed.

=== Critique of activism ===
Canadian journalist Malcolm Gladwell considers the role of social media in revolutions and protests to be overstated. He concluded that while social media makes it easier for activists to express themselves, that expression likely has no impact beyond social media. What he called "high-risk activism" involves strong relationships, coordination, commitment, high risks, and sacrifice. Gladwell claimed that social media are built around weak ties and argues that "social networks are effective at increasing participation—by lessening the level of motivation that participation requires." According to him, "Facebook activism succeeds not by motivating people to make a real sacrifice, but by motivating them to do the things that people do when they are not motivated enough to make a real sacrifice."

Disputing Gladwell's theory, a 2018 survey reported that people who are politically expressive on social media are more likely to participate in offline political activity.

=== Content ownership ===
Social media content is generated by users. However, content ownership is defined by the Terms of Service to which users agree. Platforms control access to the content, and may make it available to third parties.

Although platform's terms differ, generally they all give permission to utilize users' copyrighted works at the platform's discretion.

After its acquisition by Facebook in 2012, Instagram revealed it intended to use content in ads without seeking permission from or paying its users. It then reversed these changes, with then-CEO Kevin Systrom promising to update the terms of service.

=== Privacy ===
Privacy rights advocates warn users about the collection of their personal data. Information is captured without the user's knowing consent. Data may be applied to law enforcement or other governmental purposes. Information may be offered for third party use.

Young people are prone to sharing personal information that can attract predators.

While social media users claim to want to keep their data private, their behavior does not reflect that concern, as many users expose significant personal data on their profiles.

In addition, platforms collect data on user behaviors that are not part of their personal profiles. This data is made available to third parties for purposes that include targeted advertising.

A 2014 Pew Research Center survey reported that 91% of Americans "agree" or "strongly agree" that people have lost control over how personal information is collected and used. Some 80% of social media users said they were concerned about advertisers and businesses accessing the data they share on social media platforms, and 64% said the government should do more to regulate advertisers. In 2019, UK legislators criticized Facebook for not protecting certain aspects of user data.

In 2019 the Pentagon issued guidance to the military, Coast Guard and other government agencies that identified "the potential risk associated with using the TikTok app and directs appropriate action for employees to take in order to safeguard their personal information." As a result, the military, Coast Guard, Transportation Security Administration, and Department of Homeland Security banned the installation and use of TikTok on government devices.

In 2020, the US government attempted to ban TikTok and WeChat from the United States over national security concerns. However, a federal court blocked the move. In 2024, the US Congress passed a law directing TikTok's parent company, ByteDance, to divest the service or see the service banned from operating in the US. The company sued, challenging the constitutionality of the law, but the US Supreme Court upheld the ban as constitutional in January 2025. An agreement was reached in January 2026 that allowed TikTok to continue operating in the US by creating a new American entity called TikTok US Joint Venture. Under this deal, ByteDance retains a 19.9% share of the stock while investors including Oracle, Silver Lake, and MGX hold the remaining stake.

=== Addiction ===
Internet addiction disorder (IAD), also called problematic Internet use (PIU), is characterized by excessive or poorly controlled preoccupations, urges, or behaviors regarding computer use and Internet access that lead to impairment or distress. There is concern that increased access to the Internet among young people may cause students' academic performance to decline. Some experience health consequences from loss of sleep as they stay up to continue scrolling, chatting, and gaming.

Excessive Internet use is not recognized as a disorder by the American Psychiatric Association's DSM-5 or the World Health Organization's ICD-11. Controversy around the diagnosis includes whether the disorder is a separate clinical entity, or a manifestation of other underlying psychiatric disorders. Definitions are not standardized or agreed upon, complicating the development of evidence-based recommendations.

Many different theoretical models have been developed and employed for many years in order to better explain predisposing factors to this disorder. Models such as the cognitive-behavioral model of pathological Internet have been used to explain IAD for more than 20 years. Newer models, such as the Interaction of Person-Affect-Cognition-Execution model, have been developed more recently and are starting to be applied in more clinical studies.

In 2011 the term "Facebook addiction disorder" (FAD) emerged. FAD is characterized by compulsive use of Facebook. A 2017 study investigated a correlation between excessive use and narcissism, reporting "FAD was significantly positively related to the personality trait narcissism and to negative mental health variables (depression, anxiety, and stress symptoms)".

Additionally in 2020, studies have shown that there has been an increase in the prevalence of IAD since the COVID-19 pandemic. Studies highlighting the possible relationship between COVID-19 and IAD have looked at how forced isolation and its associated stress may have led to higher usage levels of the Internet.

Turning off social media notifications may help reduce social media use. For some users, changes in web browsing can be helpful in compensating for self-regulatory problems. For instance, a study involving 157 online learners on massive open online courses examined the impact of such an intervention. The study reported that providing support in self-regulation was associated with a reduction in time spent online, particularly on entertainment.

Research suggests that social media platforms trigger a cycle of compulsive behavior, which reinforces addictive patterns and makes it harder for individuals to break the cycle.

Various lawsuits have been brought regarding social media addiction, such as the Multi-District Litigation alleging harms caused by social media addiction on young users.

=== Debate over use by young people ===
Whether to restrict the use of phones and social media among young people has been debated since smartphones became ubiquitous. A study of Americans aged 12–15, reported that teenagers who used social media over three hours/day doubled their risk of negative mental health outcomes, including depression and anxiety. Platforms have not tuned their algorithms to prevent young people from viewing inappropriate content. A 2023 study of Australian youth reported that 57% had seen disturbingly violent content, while nearly half had regular exposure to sexual images. Further, youth are prone to misuse social media for cyberbullying. As result, phones have been banned from some schools, and in the US some schools have blocked social media websites.

Intense discussions are taking place regarding the imposition of certain restrictions on children's access to social media. It is argued that using social media at a young age brings with it many problems. For example, according to a survey conducted by Ofcom, the media regulator in the UK, 22% of children aged 8–17 lied about being over 18 on social media. According to a system implemented in Norway, more than half of nine-year-olds and the vast majority of 12-year-olds spend time on social media. A series of measures, which can be categorized into parental responsibility and online service provider responsibility, have begun to be taken to prevent the risks caused by such problems. The countries that have taken concrete steps in this regard are Norway and France. Since June 2023, France has started requiring social media platforms to verify the ages of their users and to obtain parental consent for those under the age of 15. In Norway, there is a minimum age requirement of 13 to access social media. The Online Safety Law in the UK gave social media platforms until mid-2025 to strengthen their age verification systems. Building on a framework for age or functionality restrictions already established by UK law and parliamentary action, the UK government announced in June 2024 that it would ban social media for under-16s as a child-safety measure, planning to use an Australia-style model.

=== Censorship ===
Social media often features in political struggles. In some countries, Internet police or secret police monitor or control citizens' use of social media. For example, in 2013 some social media was banned in Turkey after the Taksim Gezi Park protests. Both X and YouTube were temporarily suspended in the country by a court's decision. A law granted immunity to Telecommunications Directorate (TİB) personnel. The TİB was also given the authority to block access to specific websites without a court order. Yet TİB's 2014 blocking of X was ruled by the constitutional court to violate free speech.

==== United States ====
Internet censorship in the United States of America is the suppression of speech, public communication, and other information, on the Internet in the United States. The First Amendment to the US Constitution protects freedom of speech and expression against federal, state, and local government censorship. However, the Internet is highly regulated, supported by a complex set of legally binding and privately mediated mechanisms.

Gambling, cyber security, and the dangers to children who frequent social media are important ongoing debates. Significant public resistance to proposed content restriction policies has prevented measures used in some other countries from taking hold in the US.

Many government-mandated attempts to regulate content have been barred, often after lengthy legal battles. However, the government has exerted pressure indirectly. With the exception of child pornography, content restrictions tend to rely on platforms to remove or suppress content, following state encouragement or the threat of legal action.

Intellectual property protections yielded a system that predictably removes infringing materials. The US also seizes domains and computers, at times without notification.

=== Decentralization and open standards ===
While the dominant social media platforms are not interoperable, open source protocols such as ActivityPub have been adopted by platforms such as Mastodon, GNU social, Diaspora, and Friendica. They operate as a loose federation of mostly volunteer-operated servers, called the Fediverse.

In December 2019, X CEO Jack Dorsey advocated an "open and decentralized standard for social media". He joined Bluesky to bring it to reality.

=== Deplatforming ===
Deplatforming, also known as no-platforming, is a boycott on an individual or group by removing the platforms used to share their information or ideas. The term is commonly associated with social media.

=== Threat to democracy ===
A number of commentators and experts have argued that social media companies have incentives that to maximize user engagement with sensational, emotive and controversial material that discourages a healthy discourse that democracies depend on. Zack Beauchamp of Vox Media calls it an authoritarian medium because of how it is incentivized to stir up hate and division that benefits aspiring autocrats. The Economist describes social media as vulnerable to manipulation by autocrats. Informed dialogue, a shared sense of reality, mutual consent and participation can all suffer due to the business model of social media. Political polarization can be one byproduct. This can have implications for the likelihood of political violence. Siva Vaidhyanathan argues for a range of solutions including privacy protections and enforcing anti-trust laws. Andrew Leonard describes Pol.is as one possible solution to the divisiveness of traditional discourse on social media that has damaged democracies, citing the use of its algorithm to instead prioritize finding consensus.

=== Extremist groups ===
According to Like War: The Weaponization of Social Media, the use of effective social media marketing techniques includes not only celebrities, corporations, and governments, but also extremist groups. The use of social media by ISIS and Al-Qaeda has been used to influence public opinion where it operates and gain the attention of sympathizers. Social media platforms and encrypted-messaging applications have been used to recruit members, both locally and internationally. Platforms have endured backlash for allowing this content. Extreme nationalist groups, and more prominently, US right-wing extremists have used similar online tactics. As many traditional social media platforms banned hate speech, several platforms became popular among right-wing extremists to carry out planning and communication including of events; these application became known as "Alt-tech". Platforms such as Telegram, Parler, and Gab were used during the January 6 United States Capitol attack, to coordinate attacks. Members shared tips on how to avoid law enforcement and their plans on carrying out their objectives; some users called for killing law enforcement officers and politicians.

== Deceased users ==
Social media content persists unless the user deletes it. After a user dies, unless the platform is notified, their content remains. Each platform has created guidelines for this situation. In most cases on social media, the platforms require a next-of-kin to prove that the user is deceased, and give them the option of closing the account or maintaining it in a 'legacy' status.

Guidelines for users who have died, by platform
Platform	Guideline
X	The company works with an immediate family member to deactivate the account. Additionally, X will not give the account to any other person, regardless of the relationship.
Facebook	Users have the option of having their account permanently deleted after death. Users can identify a 'legacy contact' who would take over the account after.
Instagram	Users can have the account memorialized or deleted with proof of death.
LinkedIn	A family member can request that the account be deleted. The family member must identify the account, submit proof of relationship, the user's email address, date of death, a link to the obituary, and the name of the last company the deceased worked for.
Pinterest	Must email the company with the URL of the account along with a death certificate or a link to the obituary, as well as proof of relationship to the deceased.
YouTube	A representative can close the account, transfer payments from the account to an immediate family member and legal representative of the user's estate, and can provide the data in the account to a family member. All three capabilities require the requestor's government-issued ID or driver's license, the decedent's death certificate, and additional supporting documentation.
WeChat	The heir must supply the user's death certificate, authentication of family relationship. The successor can then obtain the assets.

== See also ==
- Algorithmic bias – Technological phenomenon with social implications
- Attention inequality – Term used to explain attention distribution across social media
- Citizen media – Journalistic content produced by private citizens who are not professional journalists
- Connectivism – Theory of learning in a digital age
- Connectivity (media) – Connections forged through social media
- Content aggregator – Client software that aggregates syndicated web content
- Culture jamming – Form of protest to subvert media culture
- Digital detox – Process of not using digital devices
- List of social bookmarking websites
- List of social networking services
- Metcalfe's law – Value of a communication network in terms of its connections
- Networked learning
- New media – Communication technologies
- Online presence management – Promoting a person or business online
- Online research community
- Participatory media – Communication media where the audience can play an active role
- Psychological effects of Internet use
- Social influence bias – Herd behaviours in online social media
- Social media and psychology
- Social media in education
- Social media mining – Obtaining data from a social media user's content
- Social media optimization – Form of optimization
- Social media surgery – Gathering where volunteers offer free social media advice
- Social networking service – Online platform used to build relations
- The medium is the message – Phrase in communication theory
