= Social media background check =

Security process used by organizations

A social media background check is an investigative technique that involves scrutinizing the social media profiles and activities of individuals, primarily for pre-employment screening and other official verifications. These checks are performed to review people's online behavioral history on social media websites such as Facebook, Twitter, and LinkedIn. Social media background checks have become a common part of recruitment processes, among other verification procedures.

== History ==
In the early 21st century, with the rapid expansion of social media platforms such as Facebook, Twitter, and LinkedIn, employers began to use these channels to gather additional information about prospective employees. Initially, social media background checks were an informal aspect of recruitment, but they have gradually gained formal recognition as a crucial element in candidate screening. Proponents of social media background checks argue that such reviews provide insight into a candidate's professional interests and networks, though the reliability of such assessments remains contested among researchers.

== Rise in society ==
The practice of social media background checks has seen a significant surge in the last decade. This rise can be attributed to the exponential increase in social media users and the growing awareness among organizations regarding the importance of hiring individuals who align with their values and culture. Various platforms provide services explicitly designed to conduct social media background checks efficiently, simplifying the process for businesses. Companies providing social media background check services, such as Ferretly and Certn, have received venture capital funding, reflecting investor interest in the sector. The incorporation of artificial intelligence into conducting AI-powered social media background checks also illustrates its continued popularity and that businesses are looking to ramp up and even automate their use.

High-profile cases in which individuals faced employment or admission consequences for past social media posts have raised awareness of social media background checking practices. For example, director James Gunn faced termination from Marvel Studios in 2018 over past offensive tweets, though he was later rehired. Additionally, multiple college admissions officers have acknowledged reviewing applicants' social media profiles, though such practices vary by institution.

== Evolution of ethical considerations ==
Social media background checks are not without controversy, raising significant ethical considerations that have evolved in recent years.

Privacy advocates argue that social media background checks raise concerns about data use and discrimination, particularly given the use of personal information that may not reflect job-relevant behavior. Legal scholars debate whether reviewing publicly posted information constitutes a privacy violation under U.S. law. Researchers and critics note that social media profiles often present curated representations of users' lives and may not reflect workplace behavior or professional competence.

Moreover, the accuracy of social media background checks has been called into question, with critics pointing out that these checks may not always yield reliable or comprehensive results. Critics also warn about potential misuse of information obtained from social media, including cyberbullying and harassment.

A 2023 study by found that approximately 90% of employers incorporate social media into hiring processes, with over half of those surveyed reporting they had rejected candidates based on social media content. This informal approach operates largely outside federal compliance frameworks. Critics argue that without regulation, candidates lack dispute mechanisms available under regulatory frameworks like the Fair Credit Reporting Act (FCRA), which requires compliance when background checks formally influence employment decisions.

In a hiring environment where the practice is already performed often on an individual basis, the introduction of systematic, regulated screening practices that meet federal compliance standards can present a better, fairer alternative for both employers and candidates.

== Business considerations ==
From a business perspective, social media background checks can be a valuable tool in protecting an organization's reputation and maintaining a safe and respectful workplace environment. A well-conducted social media background check can identify potential red flags, helping to prevent instances of workplace harassment or other negative behaviors.

However, businesses also face potential legal repercussions if social media background checks are conducted improperly, such as non-compliance with the Fair Credit Reporting Act (FCRA) in the United States. Critics argue that over-reliance on social media data may exclude qualified candidates whose professional competence is not reflected in their online presence.

The proliferation of social media screening services has prompted legal and industry experts to emphasize the importance of compliance with the Fair Credit Reporting Act and relevant state privacy laws when conducting such checks.

== See also ==
- Online vetting
- Social media use in hiring
