= Cardiovascular health awareness in Nepal =

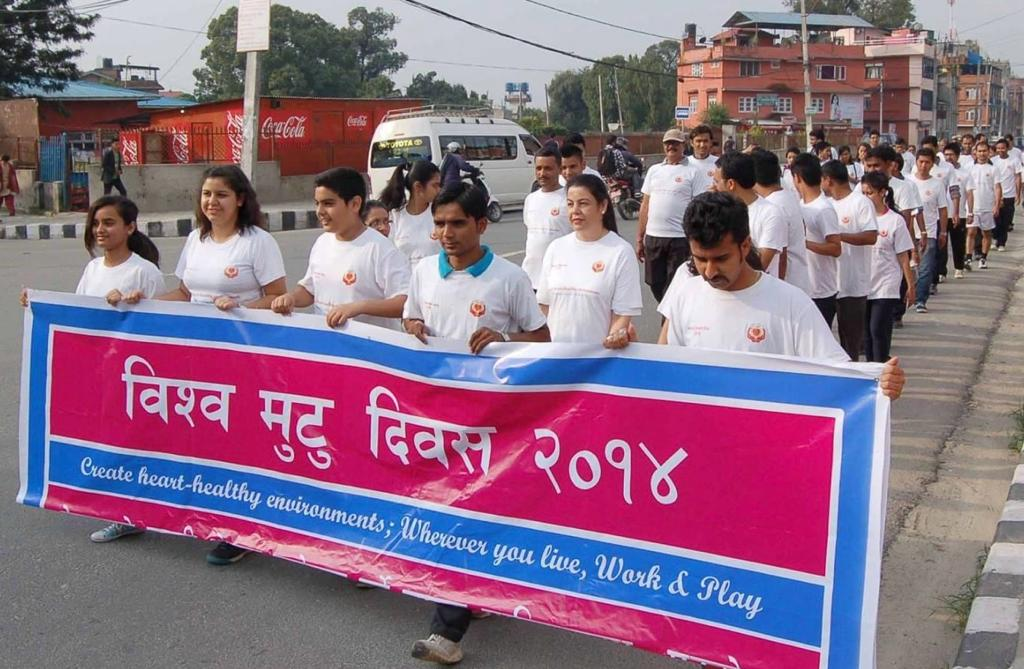
An event for cardiovascular health awareness in 2014 in Kathmandu

Cardiovascular health awareness in Nepal has improved in recent times. It has emerged as a cost-effective tool for prevention of heart disease in recent years.

== Background ==
Cardiovascular diseases in Nepal is responsible for maximum number of deaths and rapid urbanization possess extra threat in this situation emphasizing need for widespread awareness campaigns.

Efforts to enhance cardiovascular health awareness among the general public, particularly through social media platforms, have proven pivotal in motivating individuals to adopt healthier lifestyle choices and improve heart health in Nepal in recent years. These awareness initiatives, often organized on special occasions such as World Heart Day of World Heart Federation, World Hypertension Day, and World Health Day of World Health Organization, have garnered active participation from the public, reflecting a growing interest in health-related information.

Notably, various hospitals, organizations, and health professionals actively contribute to cardiovascular health awareness in Nepal. The prevalence of heart health-related content on social media platforms indicates a substantial dissemination of information. The engagement of a large number of followers underscores the audience's keen interest in health matters, evident in the significant engagement on various social media accounts and pages.

During an event of cardiovascular health awareness a Guinness World Record was achieved on World Heart Day 2023. A Facebook live awareness programme on heart health prevention attracted 11,212 viewers during the 30-minute presentation and was awarded the "Most viewers for a cardiovascular health awareness live stream on Facebook" by Guinness World Record signifying depth of public involvement and importance of social media use in health awareness.

In 2014, a 11-day heart camp was conducted in Nepal to raise awareness .

In 2015, a is a heart health education program " Mission to Save Heart" was conducted to empower health professionals to manage heart attacks and reduce heart disease deaths.
