= Online vetting =

Vetting of people's online presence

Online vetting, also known as cyber-vetting is used by potential employers and other acquaintances to vet people's online presence or "internet reputation" ("netrep") on search engines such as Google and Yahoo, and social networking services such as Facebook, Twitter, Instagram and LinkedIn. Employers may check profiles, posts, and photographs for indications that the candidate is unsuitable for a certain job or position.

== Views and practice ==
"Many young people are posting content online without thinking about the electronic footprint they leave behind.

The cost to a person's future can be very high if something undesirable is found by the increasing number of education institutions and employers using the internet as a tool to vet potential students or employees."

— David Smith, deputy commissioner for the UK Information Commissioner's Office (2007).

Social media has tremendously increased over the decades. In the United States, there are about 327 million users on social media platforms as of 2021. With so many users online, recruiters have pivoted to directly asking candidates' for their social media platforms on the initial application. This allows for recruiters to fully access and see what their candidates are doing and posting online.

A survey in 2007 found that half of UK employees would be outraged if their employers looked up information about them on social networking sites, and 56% thought it would be unethical. Employer surveys found that between approximately 20-67% of employers conduct internet searches, including of social networking sites, and that some have turned down applicants as a result of their searches. 21% of colleges and universities surveyed said they looked at the social networking of prospective students, usually for those applying for scholarships and other limited awards and programmes. Prospective political appointees to the Obama administration were asked to list all their blog posts, any emails, text messages, and instant messages that could suggest a conflict of interest or public source of embarrassment, the URLs of any sites that featured them in a personal or professional capacity, and all of their online aliases.

Job applicants have been refused due to criticising previous employers and discussing company information online, as well as for posting provocative and inappropriate photographs, drinking or drug use, poor communication skills, making discriminatory comments, and lying about qualifications. Several companies offer online reputation management services, including helping to remove embarrassing information from websites. According to a CareerBuilder study, it found that 57% of employers rejected potential employees when an online vetting scan happened.

In 2017, research findings conducted with recruiters listed three primary function of a cybervetting process:

- Screening - Process considered analogous to conventional background check and résumé analysis;
- Efficiency - A more effective way to gather information from a candidate than the conventional process;
- Relational - Analysis of a candidate relationship and behavior through social network posts.

While online vetting can be an advantage for recruiters who want to learn more about their candidates, online vetting can also cause recruiters to learn false information about their candidates. With people knowing their online presence is being seen by hundreds of people, some people would only post certain things on their social media profiles to help boost their profile and make themselves look better for other people. For example, someone might engage in a certain activity only to post it on their social media to make themselves look like a good person and make the audience think they actually care for that activity. This can cause recruiters to get a false impression of the candidate from online vetting. Due to this, some potential employees will connect with their recruiter on social media. This can be good or bad depending on if the potential employee has vetted their own social media to make sure there is nothing on there that will make them look bad.

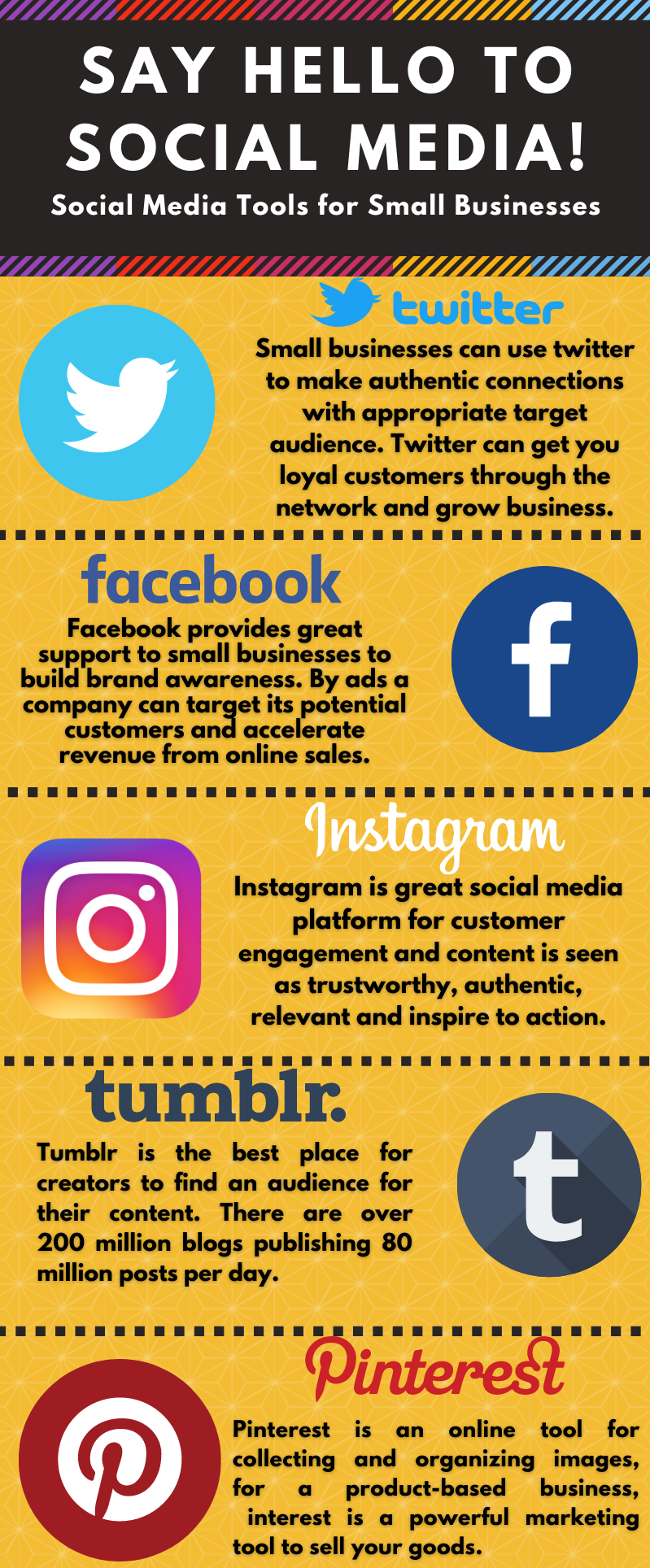
Top social media platforms used by the public.

== Legal position ==
Online vetting has begun as a main component within the vetting process for a new employee. However, there are implications that the grey areas surrounding it have issues with legality. Online vetting blurs together, a candidate's personal life with their professional livelihood, which blurs defining boundaries that are socially prominent elsewhere. Legal experts have warned human resources departments about vetting prospective employees online, due to the possibility of discrimination and the unreliability of this information. The chairman of the UK Children's Charities' Coalition on Internet Safety argued in 2007 that it was "possibly illegal, but certainly unethical". While the Information Commissioner's Office advised that just looking at information on someone's social networking profiles would not be illegal, an employment law specialist noted that under the Data Protection Act 1998, processing and storing the information or using it to make discriminatory decisions could be.

Age discrimination might result from such a practice, due to the age profile of users of social networking sites. Failed candidates may be able to use discrimination legislation to ask about vetting operations and even ask for IT records to check access to social networks. In the US, vetting using social networking sites risks breaching the Fair Credit Reporting Act (FCRA), which requires employers to gain the consent of applicants before doing a background check, state laws that limit the consideration of off-duty conduct in making employment decisions, and any searches risk breaching prohibitions against commercial use contained in the terms of service of the social networking sites.

In 2006, a trainee teacher at a high school in Pennsylvania was denied her teaching degree after her supervisor found a picture she posted on MySpace captioned "Drunken pirate" and deemed it "unprofessional". She sued, arguing that by acting on the basis of her legal out-of-hours behavior Millersville University had breached her First Amendment rights, but a federal district court ruled that the photograph was not "protected speech" under the First Amendment.

== See also ==
- Cyber-stalking
- Digital footprint
- Online identity
- Social media background check
