= Oracle Advertising =

- Formerly: Datalogix
- Type: Subsidiary
- Industry: Online Advertising
- Founded: January 1, 2002; 24 years ago in Westminster, Colorado
- Defunct: 2024
- Headquarters: Austin, Texas, United States
- Parent: Oracle Corporation
- Website: www.oracle.com/cx/advertising/

Oracle Advertising, formerly Datalogix, is an American cloud-based consumer data collection, activation, and measurement platform for use by digital advertisers. Datalogix was a consumer data collection company based in Westminster, Colorado that provided offline consumer spending data to marketers that was acquired by Oracle in 2014.

The platform collects data which includes purchase data from stores, credit cards, and loyalty cards is used by marketing teams determine their ad campaigns' effectiveness. Datalogix clients included retail stores, grocers, travel agencies, PepsiCo, Ford, and the Dr. Pepper Snapple Group. After consumer spending behaviors are measured, the information is sold to advertising companies and publishers, such as Facebook, Google, Twitter, Snapchat, and Pinterest. Advertisers then use the information obtained to tailor online ads to reach new or existing customers. In turn, publishers use the data to determine the amount of profit advertisers earn and to try and convince them to purchase more ads that will feature on their websites.

In December 2014, Oracle acquire Datalogix and renamed the service as Oracle Advertising. In June 2024, Oracle announced it would stop supporting its advertising products.

== History ==
Datalogix was founded in Westminster, Colorado in 2002 to collect consumer data.

In May 2014, Datalogix raised $45 million in a Series C round led by Wellington Management Company. This round, joined by existing investor IVP, brought Datalogix to $86.5 million in funding plus an undisclosed round raised from Breyer Capital. In April 2013, the company raised $25 million.

In December 2014, Oracle acquire Datalogix. After the acquisition, Datalogix's name changed to Oracle Data Cloud, which later became Oracle Advertising. Oracle Advertising is part of the Oracle Advertising and Customer Experience (CX) application suite.

In 2017, Oracle also acquired Moat, an ad measurement company, which also became part of Oracle Data Cloud, which would become Oracle Advertising. The Moat acquisition added measurement and analytics capabilities to allow advertisers to track and measure media, as well as the performance of interactions with online ads.

BlueKai, a company acquired by Oracle in 2014, was merged into and became part of Oracle Marketing after the acquisition of Datalogix. Blue Kai was a cloud-based data collection platform that used website cookies to collect online tracking data. The tracking data was then used by marketers to target users with ads specific to their interests, behavior patterns, or demographics.

In June 2024, Oracle announced it would stop supporting its advertising products on September 30 2024.

== Privacy issues with consumer data collection ==
Some consumers and agencies are against companies that use Datalogix because it brings into question the issue of consent, as a vast majority of consumers do not want their information collected, measured, or sold. The FTC was involved in investigating a deal between Datalogix and Facebook, to see if it violated privacy issues.

Datalogix obtains data from Facebook users by matching e-mail addresses from a Customer Relationship Management database (CRM), along with additional information people use to create personal Facebook accounts, in order to tailor specific audiences for advertisers. Datalogix tailors specific audiences by grouping consumers together according to their similar interests, behavior patterns, or demographics. The company reports that it keeps the information anonymous and gives consumers the option to opt out of data collecting and reporting by selecting the opt-out option on its website.

== See also ==
- BlueKai
- Oracle Advertising and Customer Experience (CX)
- Oracle Corporation
