= Background check =

Process of identification of a person, for security concerns

A background check is a process used by an organisation or person to verify that an individual is who they claim to be, and check their past record to confirm education, employment history, and other activities, and for a criminal record. The frequency, purpose, and legitimacy of background checks vary among countries, industries, and individuals. An employment background check typically takes place when someone applies for a job, but it can also happen at any time the employer deems necessary. A variety of methods are used to complete these checks, including comprehensive database search and letters of reference.

== History ==
=== In the United States ===
Pre-September 11, 2001, background checks were less common and less intrusive. In the 2000s, background checks became far more common after 9/11. Government agencies such as the Transportation Security Administration (TSA) and U.S. Department of Homeland Security were created afterwards to protect national security and safeguard American citizens. These agencies were tasked with examining airport security, pre-flight screening, and predicting potential terror attacks. The Federal Bureau of Investigation has a catalogue of DNA, fingerprints, and other means of identification for people with past criminal activity.

== Purposes ==
There are many types of background checks employers may use to verify a potential new hire. These checks can include:

- Academic enrollment history
- Criminal history
- Credit history
- Driving records
- Employment history
- International background check
- Online user profile check
- Professional references check
- Professional license and certifications check

=== Employment screening ===
Employers often request background checks on job candidates for employment screening, especially for candidates seeking a position that requires high security or a position of trust, such as in a school, courthouse, hospital, financial institution, airport, and government. Background checks in the corporate realm have become a commonplace practice for many companies, aimed at mitigating legal liabilities and preventing adverse actions within their workforce.

They can also be requested when purchasing a firearm (from a legal authorization). A government agency traditionally administers these checks for a nominal fee, but private companies can also administer them. Results of a background check typically include past employment verification, credit history, and criminal history. The objective of background checks is to ensure the safety and security of the employees in the organization.

These checks are also used to assess a candidate's prior conduct and fitness for a role, and to vet prospective government employees for a security clearance. They can, however, be misused for unlawful discrimination, identity theft, or invasion of privacy.

Checks are frequently conducted to confirm information found on an employment application or résumé/curriculum vitae. One study showed that half of all reference checks done on prospective employees differed between what the job applicant provided and what the source reported. They are also used to differentiate potential employees further and to select the candidate the employer considers best suited for the position. Employers are obligated to ensure their work environment is safe for all employees and helps prevent other employment problems in the workplace.

=== Firearms purchases ===
In the United States under the Gun Control Act of 1968, citizens and US residents must be 18 years or older to purchase shotguns, rifles, or ammunition. All other firearms – such as handguns – can only be sold to individuals 21 or older. Restricted firearms (like machine guns), suppressors, explosives or large quantities of precursor chemicals, and concealed weapons permits also require criminal checks. Checks are also required for those working in positions with special security concerns, such as trucking, ports of entry, and airports (including airline transportation). Laws exist to prevent those who do not pass a criminal check from working in careers involving the elderly, disabled, or children.

== Pre-employment screening ==
Pre-employment screening refers to the process of investigating the backgrounds of potential employees and is commonly used to verify the accuracy of an applicant's claims as well as to discover any possible criminal history, workers compensation claims, or employer sanctions.

=== Brazil ===
The Brazilian legal system prohibits discrimination against employees, and the use of background checks in hiring decisions is constrained accordingly. Background checks are addressed under Articles 3, 5, and 7 of the Constitution of Brazil, and under Law No. 9.029/95, which bars discriminatory hiring practices.

=== Netherlands ===
It is the responsibility of the employer to treat all personal information collected from the employee as confidential information and to limit the access to this information within the organization. The employer cannot retain the personal information from the applicant and must have protective measures in case of data breach. The employer must give the applicant the ability to access the personal information being held about them. Dutch Data Protection Authority must be notified of the background check.

Restrictions and Laws on Background checks

- The Data Protection Act 2001
- The Equal Treatment Act 1994
- The Judicial Data and Criminal Records Act 2004
- The Medical Examinations Act 1998
- Article 8 of the European Convention on Human Rights

=== Poland ===
The first Polish research on the issue of pre-employment screening shows that 81% of recruiters have come across the phenomenon of lies in the CVs of candidates for the job. It is the responsibility of the employer to collect necessary information and to protect it so that only certain people in the organization can access it. The applicant must receive a copy of the background check so that the applicant has the opportunity to make sure that the information in the background check is correct. The employer is not permitted to keep the personal information for a longer period than necessary.

Restrictions and Laws on Background checks

- The Polish Constitution dated 2 April 1997
- Article 8 of the European Convention on Human Rights
- Act of 26 June 1974 on The Labour Code
- Act of 24 May 2000 on National Criminal Records
- Act of 4 March 1994 on the Company Social Fund
- Act of 29 August 1997 on Personal Data Protection
- Regulation of Work and Social Policy Minister dated 28 May 1996

=== United Kingdom ===
The employer has to treat the personal information from the applicant as confidential. The applicant has to receive a copy of the background in order to verify or update the information it contains. The employer cannot retain the information more than it is necessary. The employer has to give any one who comes in contact with the information of the applicant a code of conduct. The company has to go through an audit to make sure they are complying and protecting the data.

Restrictions and Laws on Background Checks

- Criminal records checks: Protection of Freedoms Act 2012, Rehabilitation of Offenders Act 1974, Rehabilitation of Offenders Act 1974 (Exceptions) Order 1975
- Ability to work in the UK: Immigration, Asylum and Nationality Act 2006
- The Equality Act 2010
- Data Protection Act 1998
- Article 8 of the European Convention on Human Rights (and Human Rights Act 1998)

During the 2008 financial crisis, the level of fraud almost doubled. Background-checking firm Powerchex claimed the number of applicants lying on their applications increased after the start of the 2008 financial crisis. In 2009, Powerchex claimed that nearly one in 5 applicants has a major lie or discrepancy on his or her application. Almost half (48%) of organizations with fewer than 100 staff experienced problems with vetted employees. The research shows how many failures occurred in the relationship between employer and employee over the years and what dangers it brings. Applicants usually lie about additional skills (85%), dates of employment (58%), responsibilities (53%) or positions (28%).

==== Regulation ====
The Financial Services Authority states in their Training & Competence guidance that regulated firms should have:

- Adequacy of procedures for taking into account knowledge and skills of potential recruits for the role
- Adequacy of procedures for obtaining sufficient information about previous activities and training
- Adequacy of procedures for ensuring that individuals have passed appropriate exams or have appropriate exemptions
- Adequacy of procedures for assessing competence of individuals for sales roles

The Financial Services Authority's statutory objectives:

1. Protecting consumers
2. Maintaining market confidence
3. Promoting public awareness
4. Reducing financial crime

=== United States ===
The employer must obtain consent from the applicant granting approval of the background check. The employer must be in accordance with the Fair Credit Reporting Act. The employers have to guarantee that they will not discriminate against the applicant.

Most notably, the Fair Credit Reporting Act (FCRA) regulates the use of consumer reports (which it defines as information collected and reported by third party agencies) as it pertains to adverse decisions, notification to the applicant, and destruction and safekeeping of records. If a consumer report is used as a factor in an adverse hiring decision, the applicant must be presented with a "pre-adverse action disclosure," a copy of the FCRA summary of rights, and a "notification of adverse action letter." Individuals are entitled to know the source of any information used against them, including a credit reporting company. Individuals must also consent in order for the employer to obtain a credit report.

A 2026 resume.io survey of 600 U.S. professionals revealed that 21.5 percent lied on their resume within the past year, rising to 38.9 percent among active job seekers. Broadening this scope, GCheck's 2026 Trust in Hiring Report of 1,500 candidates found that 93 percent admitted to at least one form of embellishment during the hiring process.

Restriction and laws on Background Check

- Arrest and conviction records: Title VII of the Civil Rights Act of 1964; Cal. Lab. Code § 432.7; Cal. Lab. Code § 432.8; Cal. Pen. Code § 290.46(k)(2); 775 ILCS 5/2-103; Job Opportunities for Qualified Applicants Act, 820 ILCS 75/15; N.Y. Correct. Law § 752; N.Y. Exec. Law § 296 (15), (16); 18 Pa.C.S. § 9125
- Credit/financial checks: Consumer Credit Reporting Agencies Act, Cal. Civ. Code § 1785.13; Cal. Lab. Code § 1024.5; 820 ILCS 70/10
- Health checks/medical screening: Americans with Disabilities Act, 42 U.S.C. § 12101, et seq.; Genetic Information Nondiscrimination Act, 42 U.S.C. § 2000ff, et seq.; Cal. Lab. Code § 132a
- Social media: Cal. Lab. Code § 980; 820 ILCS 55/10(a)
- Record disposal: 16 CFR Part 682
- Record keeping: 29 CFR Part 160
- Records/information obtained from consumer reporting agencies, including but not limited to education and employment records, credit and financial records, and social media: Fair Credit Reporting Act, 15 U.S.C. § 1681, et seq.; Consumer Credit Reporting Agencies Act, Cal. Civ. Code § 1785.13(a)(6); Investigative Consumer Reporting Agencies Act, Cal. Civ. Code § 1786.18(a)(7); Cal. Civ. Code § 1786.53
- Political affiliation: D.C. Code § 2–1402.11; Wis. Stat. Ann. § 111.321
- Polygraph tests: Employee Polygraph Protection Act, 29 U.S.C. §§ 2002, 2006; Cal. Lab. Code § 432.2; 225 ILCS 430/14.1; N.Y. Lab. Law §§ 733–739; 18 Pa.C.S. § 7321

==== Florida ====
Under Title XLV, section 768.095 of the Florida Statutes, former employers may disclose information about a past employee to a prospective employer without incurring liability for negligent hiring, provided the information is accurate; a former employer who discloses false information can be held liable for violating the employee's rights.

== Obtaining background checks ==
There are a variety of types of investigative searches that can be used by potential employers. Many commercial sites will offer specific searches to employers for a fee. Services like these will actually perform the checks, supply the company with adverse action letters, and ensure compliance throughout the process. It is important to be selective about which pre-employment screening agency one uses. A legitimate company will maintain a background check policy and will explain the process. Fingerprint-based background checks can be used as part of screening when fingerprint-based identification is required.

Many employers choose to search the most common records such as criminal records, driving records, and education verification. Other searches such as sex offender registry, credential verification, skills assessment, reference checks, credit reports and Patriot Act searches are becoming increasingly common.

Larger companies are more likely to outsource than their smaller counterparts – the average staff size of the companies who outsource is 3,313 compared to 2,162 for those who carry out in-house checks. Financial service firms had the highest proportion of respondents who outsource the service, with over a quarter (26%) doing so, compared to an overall average of 16% who outsource vetting to a third party provider. The construction and property industry showed the lowest level of outsourcing, with 89% of such firms in the sample carrying out checks in-house, making the overall average 16%. This can increase over the years. Companies that choose to outsource must be sure to use companies that are Fair Credit Reporting Act (FCRA) compliant. Companies that fail to use an FCRA compliant company may face legal issues.

As a general rule, employers may not take adverse action against an applicant or employee (not hiring or terminating them), solely on the basis of results obtained through a database search. Database searches, as opposed to source records searches (search of actual county courthouse records), are notoriously inaccurate, contain incomplete or outdated information, and should only be used as an added safety net when conducting a background check. Failure by employers to follow FCRA guidelines can result in hefty penalties.

== Criminal records ==
In the United States, the employer could use criminal records as verification as long as the employer does not discriminate based on race, color, religion, sex or national origin, as analyzed under the disparate treatment and disparate impact frameworks. There are several types of criminal record searches available to employers, some more accurate and up to date than others. These "third party" background checking agencies cannot guarantee the accuracy of their information, thus many of them have incomplete records or inaccurate records. The only way to conduct an accurate background check is to go directly through the state. Most times using the state of choice is much cheaper than using a "third party" agency. Many websites offer the "instant" background check, which will search a compilation of databases containing public information for a fee. These "instant" searches originate from a variety of sources, from statewide court and corrections records to law enforcement records which usually stem from county or metro law enforcement offices. There are also other database-type criminal searches, such as statewide repositories and the national crime file. A commonly used criminal search by employers who outsource is the county criminal search.

== Social media ==
Employers could use social media as tool to conduct a background check on an applicant. An employer could check the applicant's Facebook, Twitter, and LinkedIn accounts to see how the applicant behaves outside of work. U.S. employers are legally prohibited from taking into account anything they discover about a person's marital status, sexual orientation, religion, or political views when making the final decision to hire or not hire the applicant. Some companies provide Media Mentions Reports collected from open sources including Social Media public accounts.

== Character reference checks ==
Employers may investigate past employment to verify position and salary information. More intensive checks can involve interviews with anybody that knew or previously knew the applicant—such as teachers, friends, coworkers, neighbors, and family members; however, extensive hearsay investigations in background checks can expose companies to lawsuits. Past employment and personal reference verifications are moving toward standardization with most companies in order to avoid expensive litigation. These usually range from simple verbal confirmations of past employment and timeframe to deeper, such as discussions about performance, activities and accomplishments, and relations with others. The past experiences and the companies which have provided these experiences are also verified and researched upon to detect frauds.

== Identity and address verification ==
A fraudulent SSN may be indicative of identity theft, incorrect claims of citizenship status, or concealment of a "past life". Background screening firms usually perform a Social Security trace to determine where the applicant or employee has lived. The hiring of undocumented workers has become an increasing issue for American businesses since the formation of the Department of Homeland Security and its Immigration and Customs Enforcement (ICE) division, as immigration raids have forced employers to consider including legal working status as part of their background screening process. All employers are required to keep government Form I-9 documents on all employees and some states mandate the use of the federal E-Verify program to research the working status of Social Security numbers. With increased concern for right-to-work issues, many outsourcing companies are sprouting in the marketplace to help automate and store Form I-9 documentation.

== Credit check ==
Credit checks are conducted for applicants who are applying to positions that deal with financial records or deal with a lot of money. For example, in the state of Illinois, employers could use an applicant's credit history, only the credit score is considered satisfactory. Individuals must also give consent in order for the employer to obtain a credit report. Pre-employment credit reports do not include a credit score. A pre-employment credit report will show up on an individual's credit report as a "soft inquiry" and do not affect the individual's credit score.

== Controversies ==
Drug tests and credit checks for employment are highly controversial practices. According to the Privacy Rights Clearinghouse, a project of the Utility Consumers' Action Network (UCAN): "While some people are not concerned about background investigations, others are uncomfortable with the idea of investigators poking around in their personal histories. In-depth checks could unearth information that is irrelevant, outdated, taken out of context, or just plain wrong. A further concern is that the report might include information that is illegal to use for hiring purposes or which comes from questionable sources."

In May 2002, allegedly improper post-hire checks conducted by Northwest Airlines were the subject of a civil lawsuit between Northwest and 10,000 of their mechanics.

In the case of an arrest that did not lead to a conviction, employment checks can continue including the arrest record for up to seven years, per § 605 of the Fair Credit Reporting Act:

Except as authorized under subsection (b) of this section, no consumer reporting agency may make any consumer report containing . . . Civil suits, civil judgments, and records of arrest that from date of entry, antedate the report by more than seven years or until the governing statute of limitations has expired, whichever is the longer period.

Subsection (b) provides for an exception if the report is in connection with "the employment of any individual at an annual salary which equals, or which may reasonably be expected to equal $75,000, or more".

Some proposals for decreasing potential harm to innocent applicants include:

- Furnishing the applicant with a copy of the report before it is given to the employer, so that any inaccuracies can be addressed beforehand; and
- Allowing only conviction (not arrest) records to be reported.

Further controversies to background checks include firearms processing and munitions sales. As of March 2025, federal law requires background checks be conducted for gun purchases from a gun dealer. As gun violence across schools and public spaces increase, so does the need to call for better background checks. Not all states require background checks for handgun purchases however. To buy a gun, prospective gun owners must submit a background check through the National Instant Criminal Background Check System (NICS). They then must fill out ATF form 4473 which after, the licensed firearm dealer send this back go NICS. NICS then do their own background check to verify the other eligibilities to purchase a firearm.

In New Zealand, criminal checks have been affected by the Criminal Records (Clean Slate) Act 2004, which allows individuals to legally conceal "less serious" convictions from their records provided they had been conviction-free for at least seven years.

In Michigan, the system of criminal checks has been criticized in a recent case where a shooting suspect was able to pass an FBI check to purchase a shotgun although he had failed the check for a state handgun permit. According to the spokesman of the local police department,

"... you could have a clear criminal history but still have contacts with law enforcement that would not rise to the level of an arrest or conviction [that can be used] to deny a permit whether or not those involved arrests that might show up on a criminal history."

The Brady Campaign to Prevent Gun Violence has criticized the federal policy, which denies constitutional rights based on a criminal check only if the subject has been accused of a crime.

== See also ==
- Credit check
- Criminal record check
- Employment discrimination
- Data broker
- Identity resolution
- Negligence in employment
- Psychological evaluation
- Security clearance
- Social media background check
- Solid (web decentralization project)
- Universal background check, a U.S. political term regarding firearm sales
- Vetting
- Online vetting
- Vaccination records
