= Social media use in hiring =

Using social media in hiring

Social media use in hiring refers to the examination by employers of job applicants' (public) social media profiles as part of the hiring assessment. For example, the vast majority of Fortune 500 companies use social media as a tool to screen prospective employees and as a tool for talent acquisition.

This practice raises ethical questions. Employers and recruiters note that they have access only to information that applicants choose to make public. Many Western-European countries restrict employer's use of social media in the workplace. States including Arkansas, California, Colorado, Illinois, Maryland, Michigan, Nevada, New Jersey, New Mexico, Utah, Washington, and Wisconsin protect applicants and employees from surrendering usernames and passwords for social media accounts. Use of social media has caused significant problems for some applicants who are active on social media. A 2013 survey of 17,000 young people in six countries found that one in ten people aged 16 to 34 claimed to have been rejected for a job because of social media activity.

Social media services have been reported to affect deception in resumes. While these services do not affect deception frequency, it does increase deception about interests and hobbies.

== Ethical implications ==
This issue raises many ethical questions that some consider an employer's right and others consider discrimination. As of 2016, except in the states of California, Maryland, and Illinois, there are no laws that prohibit employers from using social media profiles as a basis of whether or not someone should be hired. Title VII also prohibits discrimination during any aspect of employment including hiring or firing, recruitment, or testing. Social media has been integrating into the workplace, and this has led to conflicts within employees and employers.^{[107]} Particularly, Facebook has been seen as a popular platform for employers to investigate in order to learn more about potential employees. This conflict first started in Maryland when an employer requested and received an employee's Facebook username and password. State lawmakers first introduced legislation in 2012 to prohibit employers from requesting passwords to personal social accounts in order to get a job or to keep a job. This led to Canada, Germany, the U.S. Congress and 11 U.S. states to pass or propose legislation that prevents employers' access to private social accounts of employees.^{[108]}

Many Western European countries have already implemented laws that restrict the regulation of social media in the workplace. States including Arkansas, California, Colorado, Illinois, Maryland, Michigan, Nevada, New Jersey, New Mexico, Utah, Washington, and Wisconsin have passed legislation that protects potential employees and current employees from employers that demand them to give forth their username or password for a social media account. Laws that forbid employers from disciplining an employee based on activity off the job on social media sites have also been put into act in states including California, Colorado, Connecticut, North Dakota, and New York. Several states have similar laws that protect students in colleges and universities from having to grant access to their social media accounts. Eight states have passed the law that prohibits post secondary institutions from demanding social media login information from any prospective or current students and privacy legislation has been introduced or is pending in at least 36 states as of July 2013. As of May 2014, legislation has been introduced and is in the process of pending in at least 28 states and has been enacted in Maine and Wisconsin. In addition, the National Labor Relations Board has been devoting a lot of their attention to attacking employer policies regarding social media that can discipline employees who seek to speak and post freely on social media sites.

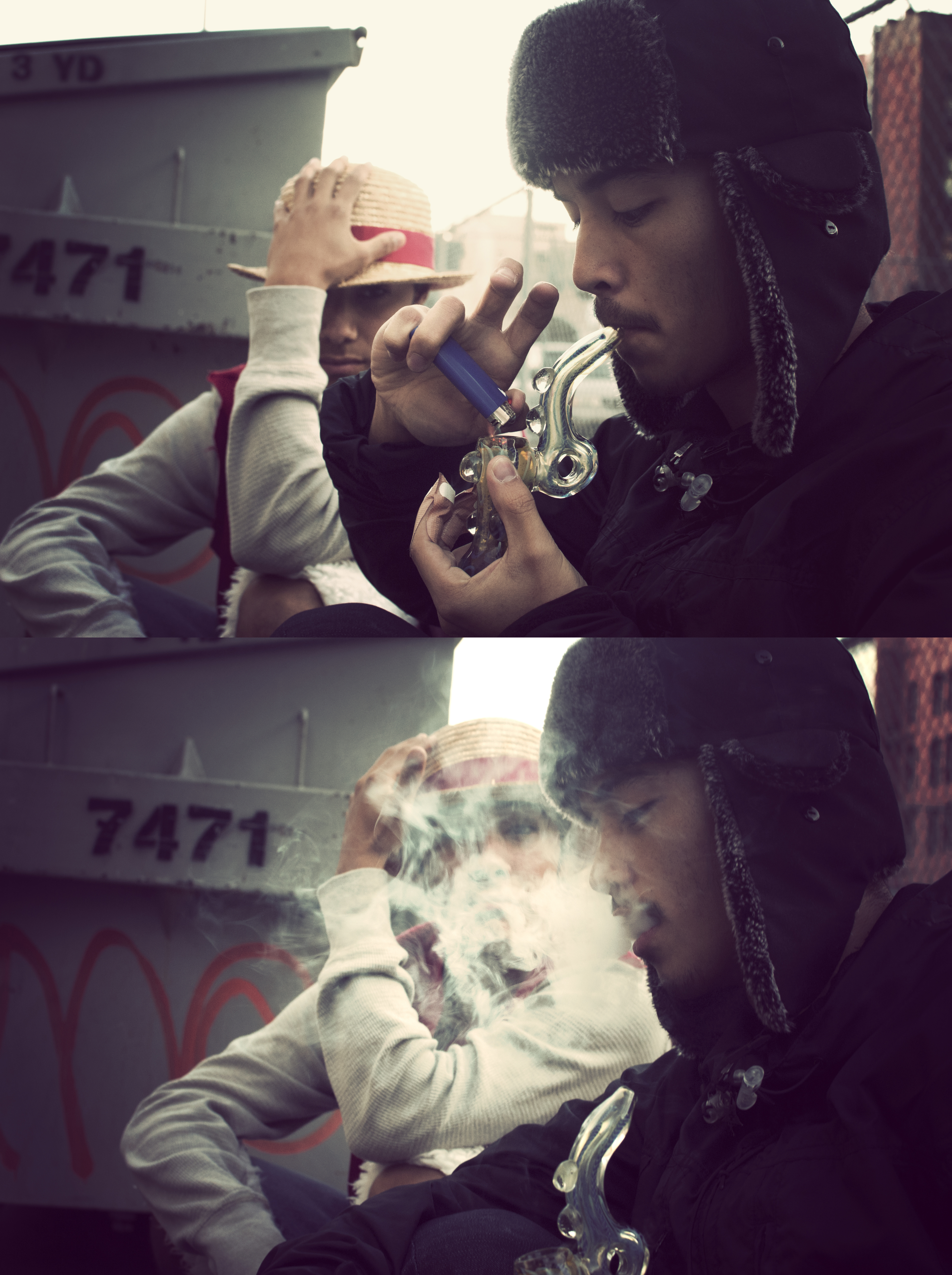
If a young person posts photos on social media of themselves using drugs, this could adversely affect their chance of getting various types of jobs.

Use of social media by young people has caused significant problems for some applicants who are active on social media when they try to enter the job market. A survey of 17,000 young people in six countries in 2013 found that 1 in 10 people aged 16 to 34 have been rejected for a job because of online comments they made on social media websites. A 2014 survey of recruiters found that 93% of them check candidates' social media postings. Moreover, professor Stijn Baert of Ghent University conducted a field experiment in which fictitious job candidates applied for real job vacancies in Belgium. They were identical except in one respect: their Facebook profile photos. It was found that candidates with the most wholesome photos were a lot more likely to receive invitations for job interviews than those with the more controversial photos. In addition, Facebook profile photos had a greater impact on hiring decisions when candidates were highly educated.

These cases have created some privacy implications as to whether or not companies should have the right to look at employee's Facebook profiles. In March 2012, Facebook decided they might take legal action against employers for gaining access to employee's profiles through their passwords. According to Facebook Chief Privacy Officer for policy, Erin Egan, the company has worked hard to give its users the tools to control who sees their information. He also said users shouldn't be forced to share private information and communications just to get a job. According to the network's Statement of Rights and Responsibilities, sharing or soliciting a password is a violation of Facebook policy. Employees may still give their password information out to get a job, but according to Erin Egan, Facebook will continue to do their part to protect the privacy and security of their users.

== Impacts ==
Use of social media by young people has caused significant problems for some applicants who are active on social media when they try to enter the job market. A survey of 17,000 young people in six countries in 2013 found that 1 in 10 people aged 16 to 34 have been rejected for a job because of online comments they made on social media websites. A 2014 survey of recruiters found that 93% of them check candidates' social media postings. Moreover, in 2015 professor Stijn Baert of Ghent University conducted a field experiment in which fictitious job candidates applied for real job vacancies in Belgium. They were identical except in one respect: their Facebook profile photos. It was found that candidates with the most wholesome photos were a lot more likely to receive invitations for job interviews than those with the more controversial photos. In addition, Facebook profile photos had a greater impact on hiring decisions when candidates were highly educated.

These cases have created some privacy implications as to whether or not companies should have the right to look at employee's Facebook profiles. In March 2012, Facebook decided they might take legal action against employers for gaining access to employee's profiles through their passwords. According to Facebook Chief Privacy Officer for policy, Erin Egan, the company has worked hard to give its users the tools to control who sees their information. He also said users shouldn't be forced to share private information and communications just to get a job. According to the network's Statement of Rights and Responsibilities, sharing or soliciting a password is a violation of Facebook policy. Employees may still give their password information out to get a job, but according to Erin Egan, Facebook will continue to do their part to protect the privacy and security of their users.

== Policy Responses ==
26 US states now have laws against an employer requiring a current or potential employee to give the employer their username and password.

== See also ==
- Employee Screening Questionnaire
- Social media background check
