= Sales promotion =

Short-term incentive to initiate trial or purchase

Sales promotion is one of the elements of the promotional mix. The primary elements in the promotional mix are advertising, personal selling, direct marketing and publicity/public relations. Sales promotion uses both media and non-media marketing communications for a predetermined, limited time to increase consumer demand, stimulate market demand or improve product availability. Examples include contests, coupons, freebies, loss leaders, point of purchase displays, premiums, prizes, product samples, and rebates.

Sales promotions can be directed at either the customer, sales staff, or distribution channel members (such as retailers). Sales promotions targeted at the consumer are called consumer sales promotions. Sales promotions targeted at retailers and wholesale are called trade sales promotions.

Sales promotion includes several communications activities that attempt to provide added value or incentives to consumers, wholesalers, retailers, or other organizational customers to stimulate immediate sales. These efforts can attempt to stimulate product interest, trial, or purchase. Examples of devices used in sales promotion include coupons, samples, premiums, point-of-purchase (POP) displays, contests, rebates, and sweepstakes.

Sales promotion is implemented to attract new customers, hold present customers, counteract competition, and take advantage of opportunities that are revealed by market research. It is made up of activities, both outside and inside activities, to enhance company sales. Outside sales promotion activities include advertising, publicity, public relations activities, and special sales events. Inside sales promotion activities include window displays, product and promotional material display and promotional programs such as premium awards and contests.

Sale promotions often come in the form of discounts. Discounts impact the way consumers think and behave when shopping. The type of savings and its location can affect the way consumers view a product and affect their purchase decisions. The two most common discounts are price discounts ("on sale items") and bonus packs ("bulk items"). Price discounts are the reduction of an original sale by a certain percentage while bonus packs are deals in which the consumer receives more for the original price. Many companies present different forms of discounts in advertisements, hoping to convince consumers to buy their products.

== Definition ==
Sales promotion represents a variety of techniques used to stimulate the purchase of a product or brand. Sales promotion has a tactical, rather than strategic role in marketing communications and brand strategy, it is also a form of advertisement used within a short period of time. Researchers Farhangmehr and Brito reviewed the definitions of sales promotions in marketing texts and journals and identified a set of common characteristics of sales promotion, including:

- Short-term effects and duration;
- Operates and influences only the last phase of the purchase process;
- Exhibits a secondary role in relation to other forms of marketing communication;
- Performs an accessory role regarding the product's core benefits
- Is not a single technique, rather it is a set of techniques used for a specific purpose

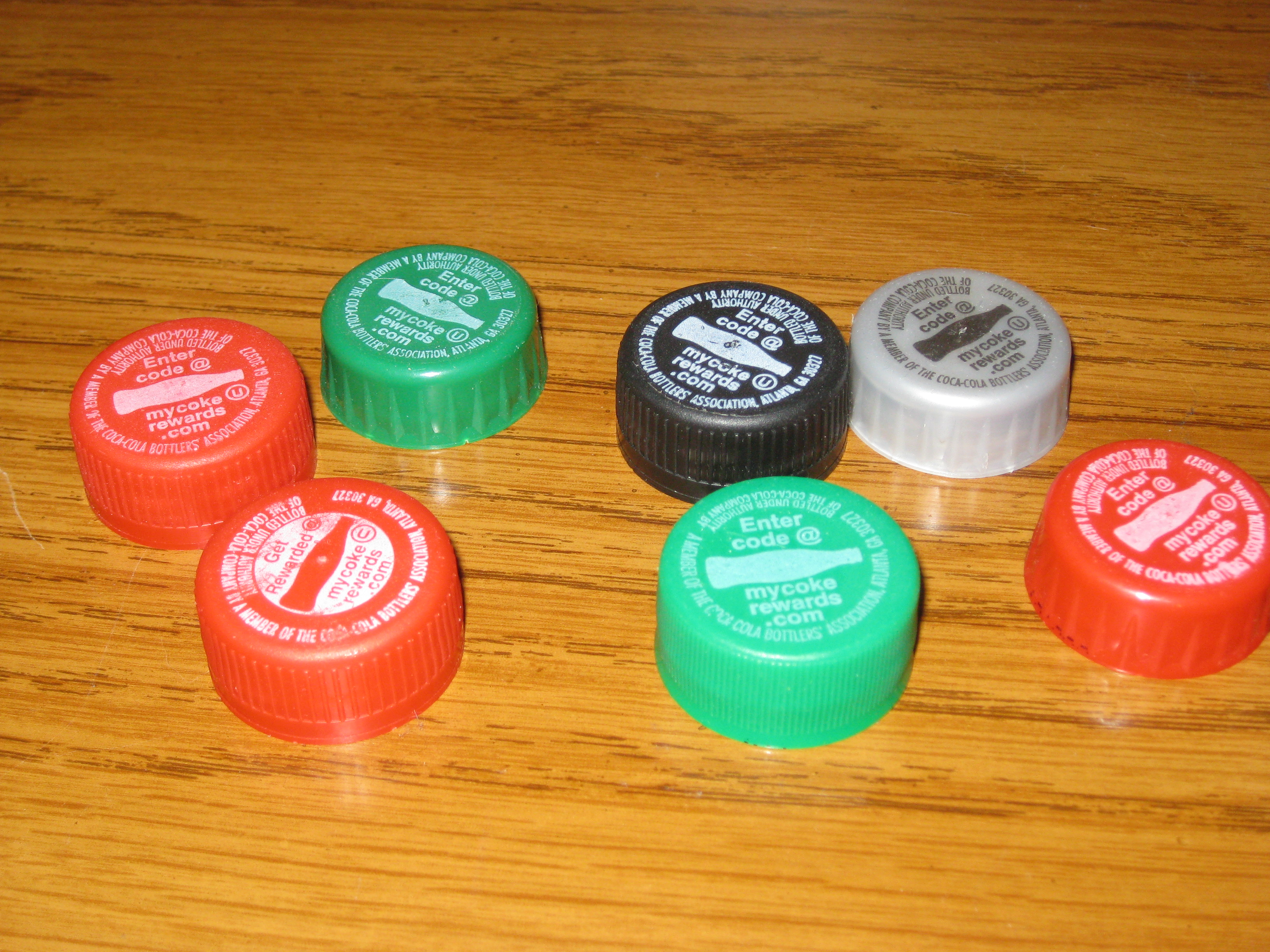
Cokecaps is a manufacturer-sponsored sales promotion targeted at consumers.

Both manufacturers and retailers make extensive use of sales promotions. Retailer-sponsored sales promotions are directed at consumers. Manufacturers use two types of sales promotion, namely:

1. Consumer sales promotions: Sales promotions targeted at consumers or end-users and designed to stimulate the actual purchase
2. Trade promotions: Sales promotions targeted at trade, especially retailers, designed to increase sales to retailers, to carry the product or brand or to support the retailer in consumer-oriented promotions

Sales promotion is useful when:

1. To launch new products to the existing market.
2. To boost sales of a product that's already being sold.
3. To bring a product into a new area or to new customers.

The impact of sales promotions may be short-lived unless supported by broader marketing efforts that foster long-term customer relationships and brand loyalty.

== Types ==
Consumer sales promotions are short-term techniques designed to achieve short-term objectives, such as to stimulate a purchase, encourage store traffic or simply to build excitement for a product or brand. Traditional sales promotions techniques include:

- Price deal: A temporary reduction in the price, such as 50% off.
- Loyal Reward Program: Consumers collect points, miles, or credits for purchases and redeem them for rewards.
- Cents-off deal: Offers a brand at a lower price. The price reduction may be a percentage marked on the package.
- Price-pack/Bonus packs deal: The packaging offers a consumer a certain percentage more of the product for the same price (for example, 25 percent extra). This is another type of deal "in which customers are offered more of the product for the same price". For example, a sales company may offer their consumers a bonus pack in which they can receive two products for the price of one. In these scenarios, this bonus pack is framed as a gain because buyers believe that they are obtaining a free product. The purchase of a bonus pack, however, is not always beneficial for the consumer. Sometimes consumers will end up spending money on an item they would not normally buy had it not been in a bonus pack. As a result, items bought in a bonus pack are often wasted and is viewed as a "loss" for the consumer.
- Coupons: Coupons have become a standard mechanism for sales promotions.
- Loss leader: The price of a popular product is temporarily reduced below cost in order to stimulate other profitable sales
- Free-standing insert (FSI): A coupon booklet is inserted into the local newspaper for delivery.
- Checkout dispensers: On checkout, the customer is given a coupon based on products purchased.
- Mobile couponing: Coupons are available on a mobile phone. Consumers show the offer on a mobile phone to a salesperson for redemption.
- Online interactive promotion game: Consumers play an interactive game associated with the promoted product.
- Rebates: Consumers are offered a money-back if the receipt and barcode are mailed to the producer.
- Contests/sweepstakes/games: The consumer is automatically entered into the event by purchasing the product.
- Point-of-sale displays:
  - Aisle interrupter: A sign that juts into the aisle from the shelf.
  - Dangler: A sign that sways when a consumer walks by it.
  - Dump bin: A bin full of products dumped inside.
  - Bidding portals: Getting prospects
  - Glorifier: A small stage that elevates a product above other products.
  - Wobbler: A sign that jiggles.
  - Lipstick Board: A board on which messages are written in crayon.
  - Necker: A coupon placed on the 'neck' of a bottle.
  - YES unit: "Your extra salesperson" is a pull-out fact sheet.
  - Electroluminescent: Solar-powered, animated light in motion.
- Kids eat free specials: Offers a discount on the total dining bill by offering 1 free kids meal with each regular meal purchased.
- Sampling: Consumers get one sample for free, after their trial and then could decide whether to buy or not.

New technologies have provided a range of new opportunities for sales promotions. Loyalty cards, personal shopping assistants, electronic shelf labels, and electronic advertising displays allow for more personalized communications and more targeted information at the point of purchase. For example, shoppers may receive alerts for special offers when they approach a product in a specific aisle.

=== Online deals vs. In-store deals ===
There are different types of discounts available online versus in the stores. On-shelf couponing: Coupons are present at the shelf where the product is available. On-line couponing: Coupons are available online. Consumers print them out and take them to the store. Although discounts can be found online and in stores, there is a different thought process when shopping in each location. For example, "online shoppers are more price-sensitive because of the readily available low search cost and direct price comparisons". Consumers can easily go to other websites and find better deals as opposed to physically going to various stores. In addition, buyers tend to refrain from purchasing bonus packs online because of the skepticism (of fraud and scams) that may come with the deal. Since "...bonus packs are more difficult than price discounts to process online, they are more difficult and effortful for the consumer to understand". For example, a buy-one-get-one-free deal on a website requires more work than the same bonus pack offered in a store. Online, consumers have to deal with payment processing, shipping and handling fees, and days waiting for the products' arrival, while in a store, the products are available without those additional steps and delays.

== Trade promotion techniques ==
- Trade allowances: Short-term incentive offered to induce a retailer to stock up on a product.
- Dealer loader: An incentive given to induce a retailer to purchase and display a product.
- Trade contest: A contest to reward retailers that sell the most product.
- Point-of-purchase displays: Used to create the urge of "impulse" buying and selling your product on the spot.
- Training programs: Dealer employees are trained in selling the product.
- Push money: Also known as "spiffs." An extra commission paid to retail employees to push products.
- Trade discounts (also called functional discounts): These are payments to distribution channel members for performing some function.

== Consumer thought process ==
=== Meaningful savings: gain or loss ===
Many discounts are designed to give consumers the perception of saving money when buying products, but not all discounted prices are viewed as favorable to buyers. Therefore, before making a purchase, consumers may weigh their options as either a gain or a loss to avoid the risk of losing money on a purchase. A "gain" view on a purchase results in chance taking For example, if there is a buy-one-get-one-half-off discount that seems profitable, a shopper will buy the product. On the other hand, a "loss" viewpoint results in consumer aversion to taking any chances. For instance, consumers will pass on a buy-three-get-one-half-off discount if they believe they are not benefitting from the deal. Specifically, consumers will consider their options because "...the sensation of loss is 2.5 times greater than the sensation of gain for the same value".

=== Impulse buying ===
Impulse buying results from consumers' failure to weigh their options before buying a product. Impulse buying is "any purchase that a shopper makes that has not been planned... [and is] sudden and immediate". For example, if a consumer has no intention of buying a product before entering a store, but purchases an item without any forethought, that was impulse buying. Product manufactures want to promote and encourage this instant purchase impulse in consumers. Buyers can be very quick to make purchases without thinking about the consequences when a product is perceived to be a good deal. Therefore, sales companies "increasingly implement promotional campaigns that will be effective in triggering consumer impulse buying behavior" to increase sales and profits

=== Comparing prices ===
Many consumers read left-to-right, and therefore, compare prices in the same manner. For example, if the price of a product is $93 and the sales price is $79, people will initially compare the left digits first (9 and 7) and notice the two digit difference. However, because of this habitual behavior, "consumers may perceive the ($14) difference between $93 and $79 as greater than the ($14) difference between $89 and $75". As a result, consumers often mistakenly believe they are receiving a better deal with the first set of prices based on the left digits solely.

=== Right digit effect ===
The right digit effect focuses on the right digits of prices when the left digits are the same. In other words, prices like $45 and $42 force consumers to pay more attention to the right digits (the 2 and 5) to determine the discount received. This effect also "implies that consumers will perceive larger discounts for prices with small right digit endings, than for large right digit endings. For example, in a $32-to-$31 price reduction, consumers will believe to have received a greater deal than a $39-to-$38 price reduction. As a result, companies may use discounts with smaller right digits to mislead consumers into thinking they are receiving a better deal and increasing profit. However, consumers also are deceived by the infamous 9-ending prices. "The right digit effect [also] relates to consumers' tendency to identify 9-ending prices as sale (rather than regular) prices or to associate them with a discount.

=== Framing effect ===
The framing effect is "the phenomenon that occurs when there is a change in an individual's preference between two or more alternatives caused by the way the problem is presented". In other words, the format in which something is presented will affect a person's viewpoint. This theory consists of three subcategories: risky choice framing, attribute framing and goal framing. Risky choice framing references back to the gain-or-loss thought processes of consumers. Consumers will take chances if the circumstance is profitable for them and avoid chance-taking if it is not. Attribute framing deals with one key phrase or feature of a price discount that is emphasized to inspire consumer shopping. For example, the terms "free" and "better" are used commonly to lure in shoppers to buy a product. Goal framing places pressure on buyers to act hastily or face the consequences of missing out on a definite price reduction. A "limited time only" (LTO) deal, for example, attempts to motivate buyers to make a purchase quickly, or buy on impulse, before the time runs out.

=== Outside forces ===
Although there are aspects that can determine a consumer's shopping behavior, there are many outside factors that can influence the shoppers' decision in making a purchase. For example, even though a product's price is discounted, the quality of that product may dissuade the consumer from buying the item. If the product has poor customer reviews or has a short "life span," shoppers will view that purchase as a loss and avoid taking a chance on it. A product can also be viewed negatively because of consumers' past experiences and expectations. For example, if the size of a product is misleading, buyers will not want to buy it. An item advertised as "huge," but is only one inch tall, will ward off consumers. Also, "the effects of personal characteristics, such as consumers' gender, subjective norms, and impulsivity" can also affect a consumer's purchase intentions. For example, a female will, generally, purchase a cosmetic product more often than a male. In addition, "some...shoppers may be unable to buy [a product]...because of financial constraints".

== Regulation ==
Sales promotions have traditionally been heavily regulated in many advanced industrial nations, with the notable exception of the United States. For example, the United Kingdom formerly operated under a resale price maintenance regime in which manufacturers could legally dictate the minimum resale price for virtually all goods; this practice was abolished in 1964.

Most European countries also have controls on the scheduling and permissible types of sales promotions, as they are regarded in those countries as bordering upon unfair business practices. Germany is notorious for having the most strict regulations. Famous examples include the car wash that was barred from giving free car washes to regular customers and a baker who could not give a free cloth bag to customers who bought more than 10 rolls.

== See also ==
- Alcohol advertising
- Behavioral clustering
- Demand chain
- Integrated marketing communications
- Marketing
- Marketing communications
- Native advertising
- Pricing
- Promotion (marketing)
- Promotional mix
- Promotional merchandise
- Sales Promotion (magazine)
- Tobacco advertising
