= Social media use in health awareness =

Social media is being increasingly used for health awareness. It is not only used to promote health and wellness but also to motivate and guide public for various disease and ailments. Use of social media was proven to be cornerstone for awareness during COVID-19 management. In recent times, it is one of the most cost effective tool for cardiovascular health awareness since it can be used to motivate people for adoption of healthy lifestyle practices. Over the span of a decade, and Doctor Mike utilized social media to significantly impact the public about cardiovascular health awareness.

== Background ==
Social media is proven to be useful for various chronic and incurable diseases where patients form groups and connect for sharing of knowledge. Similarly, health professionals, health institutions, and various other individuals and organizations have their own social media accounts for health information, awareness, guidance, or motivation for their patients. The utilization of social media for health awareness campaigns has become increasingly prevalent in recent years. The history of utilizing social media in health campaigns can be traced back to the early 2000s with the rise of platforms such as Facebook, Twitter, and YouTube.

== Health campaigns ==
Health campaigns especially for chronic diseases like cancer and heart diseases are increasingly common on different social media platforms because social media serves as a cost-effective medium for launching and promoting health campaigns. Many organizations and governmental bodies use platforms like Twitter and Instagram to reach a wide audience. This wide outreach gives health campaigns more attention and support while raising awareness of their specific cause. Recently, there have been increasing calls for health organizations to involve the public and consumer groups in their social media health campaigns to ensure their acceptability with the target audience, encouraging use of collaborations and co-design of messages.

== Research ==
When incorporating social media into health research recruitment, there is potential for a greater number of individuals to participate. Social media allows researchers to reach a wide range of participants while also allowing for recruitment 24 hours a day. There are many health organizations with large social media followings to allow them to reach a large amount of individuals. If these organizations pair with researchers and post flyers or make posts about a study they may be able to find the population that they are looking for.

Although there are positives to using social media for health research recruitment, looking at the issues is important. Using this method in recruitment may cause competition between companies for the attention of the users. Another important point is that this is dependent on the type of health condition that is being researched. For chronic conditions, there are many organizations and platforms for support while for acute illnesses, there are not as many organizations that would be able to promote these studies and post for outreach.

== Patient education ==
Patients increasingly turn to social media for health communication and health-related information. Online health communities, forums and blogs enable individuals to share their experiences, offer support, and seek advice from peers. Healthcare professionals also use social media to provide valuable insights and address common health concerns.

The use of social media for patient education allows individuals to gain more information for their illness or disease along with gaining support from individuals who may be experiencing the same. Many health organizations such as cancer organizations or organizations for chronic health conditions often have social media platforms that allow individuals to connect and even share their own stories. Peer support is beneficial to patients emotionally and even for them to understand their condition and how to cope.

Another way that social media allows individuals to gain more information is the improvement of health literacy. Medical jargon can be confusing for individuals especially when they are newly diagnosed with an illness or disease. Social media has been able to create platforms that explain the information that individuals may need when they are newly diagnosed or if they just want to learn more about their illness. Medical conditions can be confusing but using social media may allow for individuals to develop a better understanding in a manner that they understand. When patients have a better understanding of their health there will be a result of better health outcomes.

== Misinformation ==
While social media is a powerful tool for health awareness, it comes with challenges. Misinformation can spread rapidly, potentially leading to incorrect or harmful health practices. Ensuring the accuracy of health-related information on social media is an ongoing concern.

Health misinformation can be easily spread through social media to large amounts of individuals which can make this dangerous. Often, critics will question whether health-related information that is shared online is credible. Social media does not require the amount of regulation that could prevent false medical information from being disseminated online. According to The Influencer Effect: Exploring the persuasive communication tactics of social media influencers in the health and wellness industry by Deborah Deutsch, "the information shared is often lacking accepted scientific evidence or is contrary to industry standards, and, at times, deceptive, unethical, and misleading." One example of this was in 2020, when President Donald Trump said in speeches and on Twitter that hydroxychloroquine and chloroquine could be used to treat COVID-19. While these drugs are antimalaria, it was being spread that they could be used for COVID-19. This resulted in increased deaths and individuals falling ill from taking this drug and the misinformation that was spread about this drug.

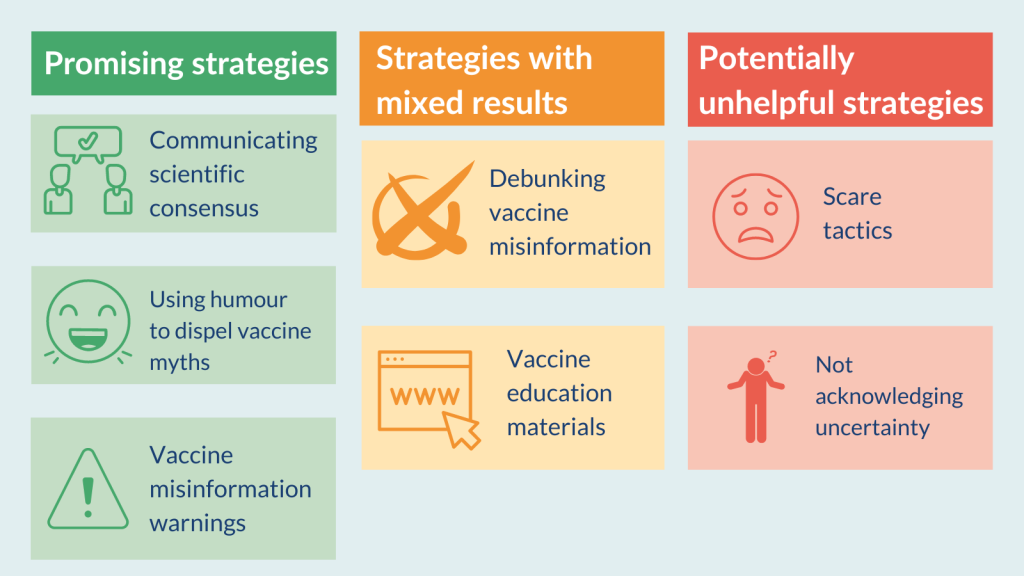
Communication strategies to tackle vaccine misinformation

Spreading misinformation regarding health is one of the biggest concerns when using social media for health awareness. When spreading misinformation about health there is an increase in confusion about what is true and what is false regardless of who is saying this information. Along with the confusion of the public, there is a sense of mistrust that is a consequence of misinformation. Individuals are seeing different opinions which leads people to a situation where they do not know whom to trust.

While health misinformation is one of the largest issues, there are ways to help prevent it. As individuals, it is important to know where you are getting your information from and learn how to identify what is misinformation and avoid the spread of it.

== Privacy and ethical issues ==
The sharing of personal health information on social media raises privacy and ethical concerns. Striking a balance between raising awareness and respecting individuals' privacy remains a delicate issue.
