= SixDegrees.com =

Social networking service (1997–2000)

- Website type: Social networking service
- Owners: MacroView (1997–1999); YouthStream Media Networks (1999–2001)
- Creator: Andrew Weinreich
- Website: sixdegrees.com at the Wayback Machine (archived 2000-05-11)
- Registration: Required
- Launched: 1997; 29 years ago
- Current status: Defunct

SixDegrees.com was a social networking service website that started in 1997 and was based on the Web of Contacts model of social networking. It was named after the concept of six degrees of separation and allowed users to list friends, family members and acquaintances whether registered on the site or not. External contacts were invited to join. People who confirmed a relationship with an existing user but did not go on to register with the site continued to receive occasional email updates and solicitations. Users could send messages and post bulletin board items to people in their first, second, and third degrees, and see their connection to any other user on the site.

SixDegrees was one of the first social networking sites that later became highly popular. It was followed by more successful sites based on the "social-circles network model" such as Friendster, MySpace, LinkedIn, and Facebook.

MacroView (later renamed to SixDegrees Inc.), the company that developed the site, was founded by CEO Andrew Weinreich in May 1996 and was based in New York City. At its height, SixDegrees had around 100 employees, and the site had around 3,500,000 fully registered members. The site was bought by YouthStream Media Networks in December 1999 for $125 million. SixDegrees shut down one year later on December 30, 2000, then brought back up a few years after.

== Andrew Weinreich ==
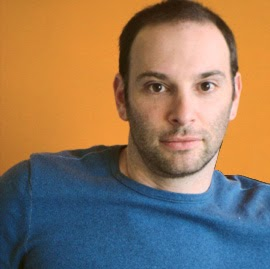
Weinreich

Andrew Weinreich (/ˈwaɪnrɪtʃ/ WYNE-ritch) is an American businessman primarily known for launching SixDegrees in 1997.

In 2001, Weinreich founded Joltage, an infrastructure services business devoted to building out a global network of Wi-Fi hotspots. Joltage was forced to shut down in 2003 when the company ran out of funding.

In 2003, Weinreich started I Stand For, Inc. He sold the company in February 2006.

In February 2006, Weinreich co-founded MeetMoi with Jeremy Levy. In 2008, Weinreich and Jeremy Levy spun off the persistent tracking technologies of MeetMoi into a separate company called Xtify. Xtify was acquired by IBM on October 3, 2013.
