= Behavioral clustering =

Behavioral clustering is a statistical analysis method used in retailing to identify consumer purchase trends and group stores based on consumer buying behaviors.

== Traditional versus behavioral clustering ==
=== Traditional clustering ===
Historically, retailers and manufacturers have grouped stores based on top-down constraints such as store size, total store sales volume, retail banner, or supply chain requirements to ensure the chain is operating efficiently. In other cases, a strategy to group stores into common demographic or geographic clusters is followed. The major benefit of using a top-down traditional approach is that, by using averages to group stores, it ensures the chain is operating at maximum efficiency. The risk when using this approach is in not meeting localized demand on a store-by-store basis, resulting in a potential loss in sales.

=== Behavioral clustering ===
When performing behavioral clustering, store clusters are formed based on analyzing the actual performance (e.g. sales dollars, units sold) of items, categories or departments, in every store within a network. This approach enables store groups to be created based on actual consumer buying behaviors.

After placing each store in a cluster, individual consumer-centric strategies can then be created to facilitate targeted marketing, advertising, merchandising, pricing, and promotion plans. In addition, once store groups are formed, retailers and manufacturers can analyze the resulting store clusters to identify demographic, psychographic, or geographic similarities. For instance, analysis of one group of stores may highlight that they are all located in a similar geographic location (in the Northeast or near large population centers) or that a particular demographic similarity may exist i.e. a specific ethnic, age or income group may have a strong preference to a particular brand or style. This allows the retailer to determine which categories will be represented in similar stores, how they will be marketed and promoted, and where they will be positioned and priced within the store.

The major benefit of using a bottom-up behavioral clustering approach is that it enables the retailer to quickly identify clusters of stores with similar demand patterns, enabling them to develop truly customer-centric marketing, merchandising, space, and pricing strategies. The risk when using this approach is a potential loss in operational efficiency if too many clusters are established. The key to behavioral clustering is to find the right balance of localization to meet consumer demand while still maintaining operational efficiency.
