= BlueKai =

Cloud-based data management platform

Oracle BlueKai Data Management Platform
- Formerly: BlueKai
- Industry: Data Management Platform
- Founded: 2008; 18 years ago in Cupertino, California
- Founder: Omar Tawakol; Alexander Hooshmand; Grant Ries; Michael Bigby
- Headquarters: Austin, Texas, United States
- Owner: Oracle Corporation

Oracle BlueKai Data Management Platform, formerly known as BlueKai, is a cloud-based data management platform which is a part of Oracle Marketing that enables the personalization of online, offline, and mobile marketing campaigns.

== Biography ==
BlueKai was created in 2008 by Omar Tawakol, Alexander Hooshmand, Grant Ries, and Michael Bigby as a marketing tech start-up based in Cupertino, California. It was acquired by Oracle on February 24, 2014, for approximately $400 million, and was renamed Oracle BlueKai Data Management Platform (DMP).

The company offers third party data collecting services. BlueKai collects PC and smartphone users' data to enhance ad marketing for their clients, and as of 2015 had about 700 million actionable profiles. BlueKai works to increase relevancy in the ads that appear for partnered companies' users. As a third party data collection company, they gather information on users surfing the web, though BlueKai claims not to collect sensitive financial details, adult material, or health issues.

Other clients and websites using BlueKai's services have included Windows Live, HuffPost, Walmart, Vimeo, Microsoft, and eBay.

After the 2014 Oracle acquisition, BlueKai’s data management platform became part of Oracle Marketing, which is part of the Oracle Advertising and Customer Experience (CX) application suite. Companies use Oracle Marketing to run marketing campaigns and manage related data from the web, social media, mobile, and email. In October 2014, it was integrated with Oracle’s cross-channel marketing product suite. This allowed marketers to anonymize customer behavioral data, integrate it with DMP’s third-party data, and create specific audience models for retargeting.

Additional acquisitions that have been integrated into Oracle Marketing include Eloqua, Responsys, DataFox, Maxymiser, Compendium, and Infinity from Webtrends.

In June 2020, TechCrunch reported that security researcher Anurag Sen had found an unsecured BlueKai database accessible on the open Internet. The database held billions of records containing names, home addresses, email addresses, and web browsing activity like purchases and newsletter unsubscribes. TechCrunch reported that under California state law, companies are required to publicly disclose data security incidents, but that Oracle had not done so at the date of the story.

In 2024, Oracle announced that it will shut down its advertising business including Bluekai. The business was supported through the end of September, 2024.

== See also ==
- Oracle Advertising and Customer Experience (CX)
- Oracle Corporation
