= David Ing =

Canadian systems scientist, business architect, management consultant (born 1957)

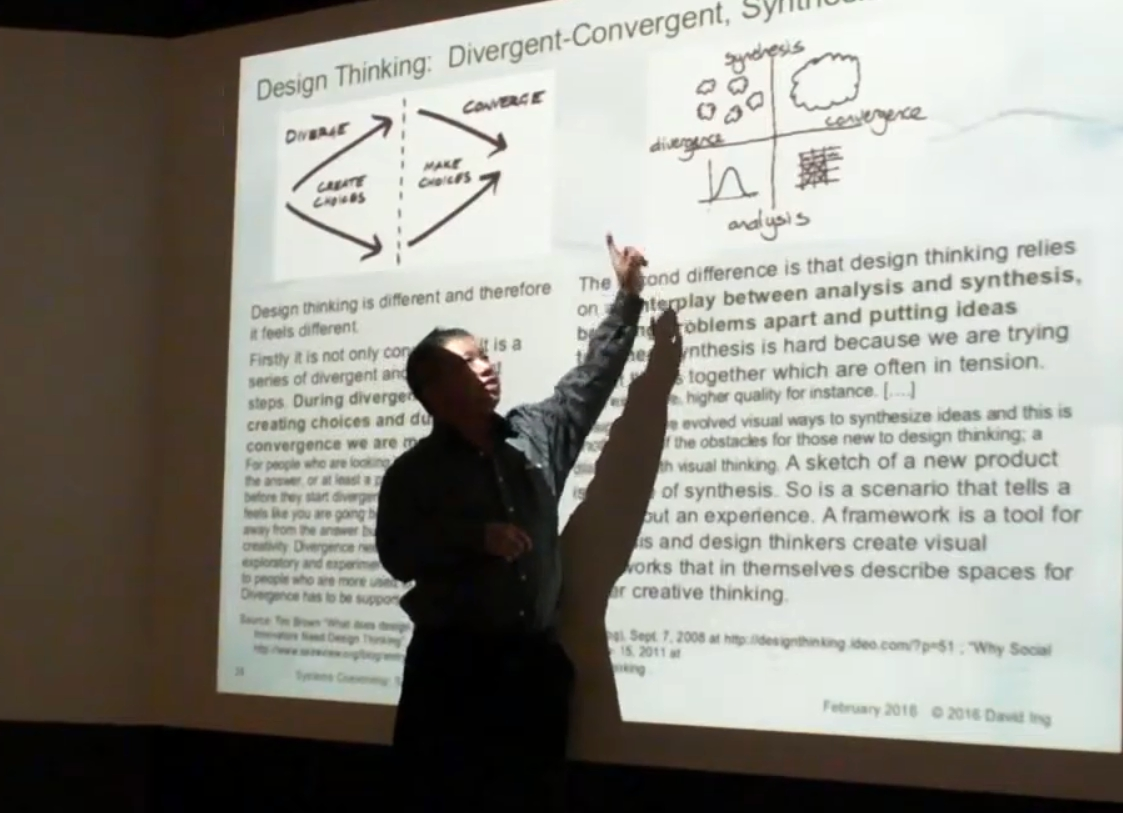
- Systems Coevolving : Sciences, Service, Smarter, Cognitive presentation, 2016
- Born: December 24, 1957 (age 68)
- Education: Kellogg School of Management at Northwestern University; Trinity College, Toronto at University of Toronto
- Known for: Open innovation; Open source
- Scientific career
- Fields: Industrial management; Systems science; Service science, management and engineering; Pattern language; Marketing science
- Workplaces: IBM
- Website: coevolving.com

David Ing (born 1957) is a Canadian systems scientist, business architect, management consultant, and marketing scientist. He served as president of the International Society for the Systems Sciences (2011-2012).

Ing was employed by IBM Canada from 1985 to 2012, with assignments as a management consultant, solution architect, industry sales specialist and headquarters planner.

David Ing, Antony Upward , and Peter H. Jones cofounded Systems Thinking Ontario at the end of 2012. This is a transdisciplinary group that has convened open monthly discussions across universities in the Toronto area for over five years.

In 2018, he published a book, Open Innovation Learning: Theory building on open sourcing while private sourcing based on doctoral research at the Aalto University School of Science. A foreword to the volume was contributed by Jim Spohrer.

== Biography ==
Ing received a B.Comm. from Trinity College at the University of Toronto in 1980, and in 1982 an MBA from the Kellogg School of Management at Northwestern University. He was a doctoral student in business strategy at the Faculty of Commerce and Business Administration at the University of British Columbia from 1982 to 1984, which he stopped in favour of continuing research in a corporate business setting. In 2003 he restarted a Ph.D. program in Industrial Engineering and Management at the Helsinki University of Technology, which has evolved to become the Aalto University School of Science.

Ing started work at IBM Canada headquarters in 1985 as a business analyst modelling econometrics. In 1987, he became a retail industry marketing specialist, working in decision support systems with retail and consumer packaged goods customers. From 1992, he became a senior management consultant in a series of promotions through IBM Consulting Group, IBM Advanced Business Institute in Palisades, New York, IBM Business Innovation Services, IBM Business Consulting Services, and IBM Global Business Services. From 2006 he was a business architect with IBM Software Group, in pre-sales consultative selling roles with the Industry Business Value Assessments North America team, and then Websphere Technical Sales through 2012. He opted for an early retirement from IBM after 28 years of service.

=== Personal ===
He received his primary and secondary school education in Gravenhurst, Ontario before studying at the University of Toronto. After his graduate studies in Evanston, Illinois and Vancouver, British Columbia, he has been a resident of Toronto, Ontario since 1985.

== Work ==
=== Marketing science ===
From 1988 to 1993, David Ing was assigned by IBM to roles in market development of decision support systems with retail industry customers. In this role, he developed prototype applications in merchandise planning and category management on the Metaphor Data Interpretation System, as it evolved to become an IBM product. This experience led to his joining IBM Consulting Group in 1994 as IT Strategy Consultant, and then leading a First-of-a-Kind project with IBM Research.

In 1990, Ing was a cofounder of the Canadian Centre for Marketing Information Technologies at the University of Toronto Faculty of Management, with Andrew A. Mitchell and Ray Serpkenci. This led to his teaching an experimental second-year MBA course for two years on "Marketing Information Technologies" as well as his co-authorship of two chapters published in The Marketing Information Revolution.

=== Sense-and-respond support system ===
According to Haeckel (1999), a business "has the two options to make offers to customers or to respond to their request. The essential difference separates the make-and-sell from sense-and-respond organizations. At the enterprise level, these two require fundamentally different organizing principles. The make-and-sell company is conceived as efficient machine for making and selling offers, while the sense-and-respond company needs to respond as an adaptive system anticipating unaccepted requests".

Sense-and-respond systems became increasingly necessary as their technologies and principles advanced. Working with Ian Simmonds in 1998, Ing developed a sense-and-respond support system specification which was not tied to any particular technology platform. It demonstrated the following key features:

- A complete representation of the firm's organizational context
- Support of collaborative decision processes
- Status tracking of commitments using protocols

The declaration of an organizational context and commitment protocols were influenced by the Language Action Perspective, as developed by Fernando Flores and Terry Winograd. The collaborative decision processes were influenced by the design of inquiring systems as described by C. West Churchman and Ian Mitroff, and through the collaboration of Vincent Barabba with Gerald Zaltman.

=== Business architecture, organization and technology ===
Between 1997 and 2001, David Ing was assigned as adjunct faculty to the IBM Advanced Business Institute, located in Palisades, New York, as Stephan H. Haeckel was writing the Adaptive Enterprise book. During this time, Ing collaborated with Ian D. Simmonds at IBM Research, on shearing layers approaches to the design of organizations and information technologies, based on the idea of the evolutionary view of How Buildings Learn by Stewart Brand.

In 2009 he was researching relational governance in business alliances, and methods for systemic change in organizations.

=== Systems sciences ===
David Ing became a member of the International Society for the Systems Sciences in 1998, contributing digests of the ISSS Atlanta meeting. He served as chair of the Special Integration Group on Systems Applications in Business and Industry from 2002 to 2009. Acting as webmaster between 2003 and 2007, he was elected as Vice-President of Communications and Systems Education (2005-2009), and then Vice-President of Research and Publications (2008-2010). In his role as president (2011-2012), he led the ISSS 2012 meeting in San Jose, California. As a member of the International Council on Systems Engineering (INCOSE), he brought together the systems sciences and systems engineering communities as a cofounder of the Systems Sciences Working Group.

In his research, Ing has been most influenced by the work of Russell L. Ackoff, C. West Churchman, David L. Hawk and Timothy F. H. Allen. In 1999, he contributed a paper to the Villanova conference honouring Ackoff on his 80th birthday.

Course development and delivery in the inaugural courses on systems thinking for the master's degree Programme in Creativity Sustainability at Aalto University were led by Ing. In October 2010, he lectured on "Systemic Thinking of Sustainable Communities" and in February 2011, he lectured on "Systemic Thinking for Planners and Designers".

Ing has been invited to a series of the biannual conversations of the International Federation for Systems Research, contributing to the proceedings of the IFSR Conversation 2010 Pernegg, Fusch Conversation 2008, Fuschl Conversation 2006 and Fuschl Conversation 2004.

He is a research fellow at the University of Hull Centre for Systems Studies, and was co-founder of the Systemic Business Community.

In 2008, he received the best student paper award at the UK Systems Society Conference at the Oxford University.

=== Service systems science ===
David Ing was early in the development of research into service science, management and engineering, due to his affiliation with Jim Spohrer since the ISSS 2005 Cancun meeting, and through communities internal to IBM.

On service systems, Ing has been most influenced by the Theory of the Offering developed by Richard Normann and Rafael Ramirez. He is known for bringing the perspectives of systems thinking and systems sciences to designing and managing services.

Through Kyoichi Kijima, David Ing has been a visiting scholar to the Tokyo Institute of Technology in the development of their Service Systems Science Research in 2012, 2011, 2010, 2009 and 2008.

In 2006 through 2008, Ing was a researcher on Rendez research project on business innovation implementation in Finland, funded by Tekes. In parallel, he was co-developer and instructor in the master's degree Program in Service Business Management at Helsinki Polytechnic Stadia.

In the period between 2001 and 2006, this research into services systems science was shaped by Ing's position in IBM Business Consulting Services as a senior management consultant.

=== Open Innovation Learning ===
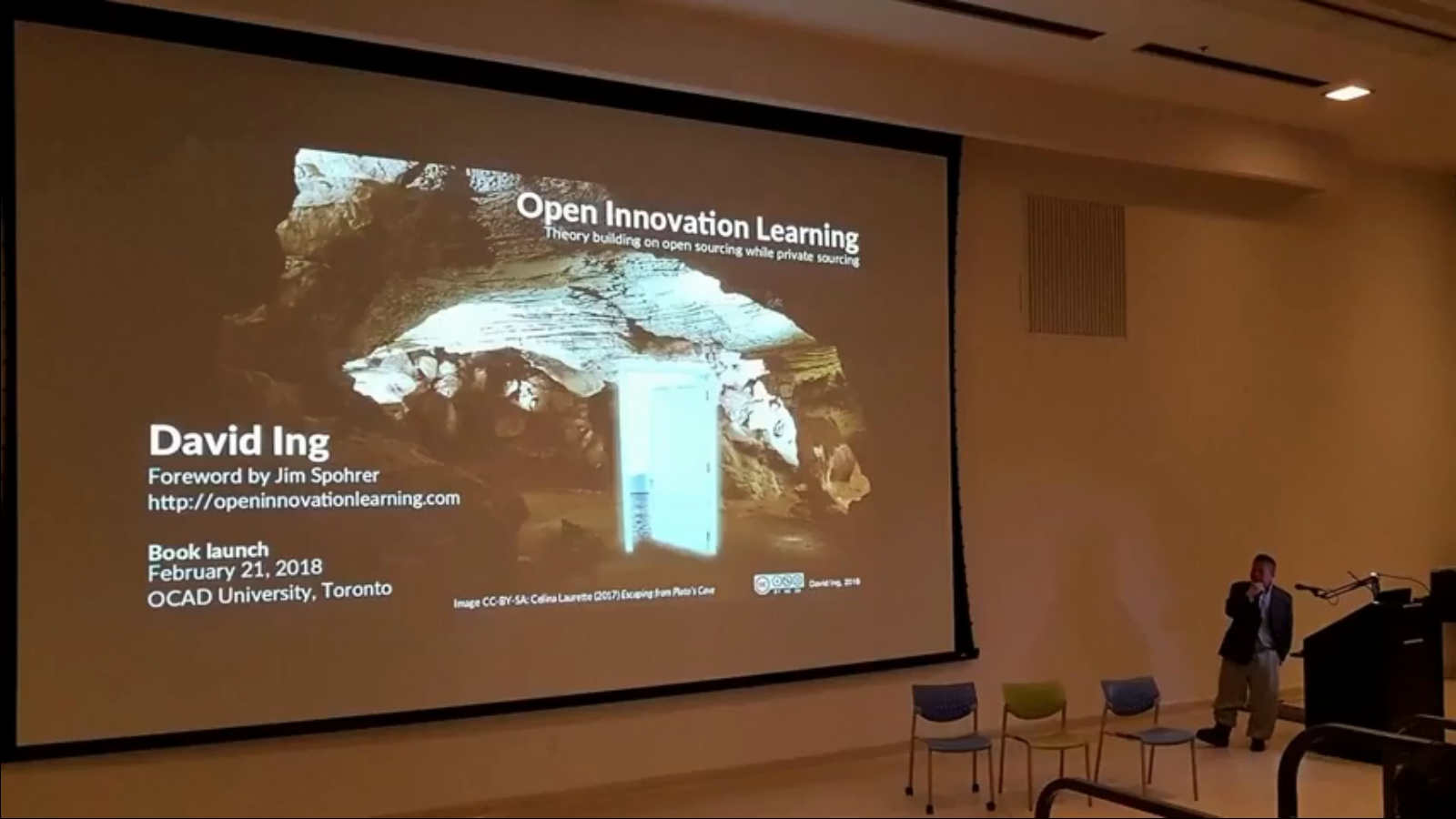
Open Innovation Learning book launch (2 of 3), presentation by David Ing, 2018

Seven cases involving IBM between 2001 and 2011 with open sourcing communities into open innovation were synthesized into new theories through a multiparadigm inquiry method.

Three descriptive theory streams are proposed alongside 3 paradigms:

- a theory of Quality-generating sequencing, in a paradigm of Architectural problem seeking;
- a theory of Affordances wayfaring, in a paradigm of Inhabiting disclosive spaces; and
- a theory of Anticipatory appreciating in a paradigm of Governing subworlds.

Three normative theory streams are proposed along a paradigm of co-responsive movement:

- a theory of Innovation learning for (based on enskilling attentionality and episteme);
- a theory of Innovation learning by (based on weaving flows in form-giving, and techne);
- a theory of Innovation learning alongside (based on agencing strands, and phronesis).

Teleonomy learns from teleology in a philosophy of alternative stable states.

== Selected publications ==
Ing has published several books and papers, books, a selection:

- Ing, David; Mitchell, Andrew A. (1994). "Chapter 2: Point-of-Sale Data in Consumer Goods Marketing: Transforming Marketing From an Art to a Science". In Blattberg, Robert C.; Glazer, Rashi; Little, John D.C. (eds.). The Marketing Information Revolution. Boston: Harvard Business School Press. pp. 30–57. ISBN 978-0875843292.
- 1998. Separating Context and Coordination: Lessons from Design Wisdom and Social Theory Leading to Adaptivity Through Shearing Layers. With Ian Simmonds. IBM Research Reports. IBM T.J. Watson Research Center, 1998.

2000s

- 2000. A Shearing Layers Approach to Information Systems Development. With Ian Simmonds. IBM Research Reports.
- 2000. Managing by wire, revisited With Ian Simmonds. IBM Advanced Business Institute White Paper, 2000.
- 2003. "Governance and the practice of management in long-term inter-organizational relations". With David Hawk, Ian Simmonds and Marianne Kosits. In: Proceedings of the 47th Annual Meeting of the International Society for the Systems Sciences at Hersonissos, Crete, July 6–11, 2003.
- Parhankangas, Annaleena; Hawk, David L.; Ing, David; Dane, Gosia; Kosits, Marianne (2005). "Negotiated Order and Network Form Organizations". Systems Research and Behavioral Science. 22 (5): 431–452. doi:10.1002/sres.717.
- Ing, David (2008). "Offerings as Commitments and Context: Service Systems from a Language Action Perspective". In Welch, Christine; Wilby, Jennifer (eds.). Systemist. UKSS International Conference 2008. Vol. 30. Oxford, UK: UK Systems Society. pp. 154–172. ISSN 0961-8309. Archived from the original on 2008-09-27.
- 2008. "Business Models and Evolving Economic Paradigms: A Systems Science Approach". In: Proceedings of the 52nd Annual Conference of the International Society for the Systems Sciences, ( Jennifer Wilby, editor), presented at the University of Wisconsin, Madison, July 16, 2008.
- July 2009. "Envisioning Innovation in Service Systems: Induction, Abduction and Deduction." In Proceedings of the 53rd Meeting of the International Society for the Systems Sciences, presented at Wilfrid Laurier University, Waterloo, Canada, July 2009.

2010s

- August 2010. "The Science of Service Systems." With Norimasa Kobayashi, Allenna Leonard, Gary Metcalf, Todd Bowers, Janet Singer and Jennifer Wilby. In Proceedings of the Fifteenth IFSR Conversation , (Gerhard Chroust and Gary S. Metcalf, editors), Institute for Systems Engineering and Automation, University of Linz, SEA-SR-28, August 2010.
- October 2010. "Panel on Service Systems and Systems Sciences in the Twenty-First Century." In INCOSE Insight, the quarterly magazine of the International Council on Systems Engineering.
- June 2011. "Systems Science and Systems Engineering Synergies." Gary S. Metcalf and David Ing, with Duane Hybertson, Harold "Bud" Lawson, Jennifer M. Wilby, Len Troncale and Hillary Sillitto. A report by a project team of the Systems Science Working Group at the INCOSE International Symposium 2012.
- July 2011. "Systems Thinking Courses in the Master's Programme on Creative Sustainability at Aalto University: Reflections on Design and Delivery of the 2010-2011 Sessions." In Proceedings of the 55th Annual Meeting of the International Society for the Systems Sciences, presented at the University of Hull, United Kingdom, July 2008.
- Ing, David (2011). "Service Systems in Changing Paradigms: An Inquiry Through the Systems Sciences". In Demirkan, Haluk; Spohrer, James C.; Krishna, Vikas (eds.). The Science of Service Systems. Service Science: Research and Innovations (SRII) in the Service Economy. Springer. pp. 267–296. doi:10.1007/978-1-4419-8270-4. ISBN 978-1-4419-8270-4.
- Ing, David (2013). "Rethinking Systems Thinking: Learning and Coevolving with the World". Systems Research and Behavioral Science. 30 (5): 527–547. doi:10.1002/sres.2229.
- Ing, David (2014). "Design Flaws and Service System Breakdowns: Learning from Systems Thinking". FormAkademisk. 4 (2). doi:10.7577/formakademisk.768.
- Ing, David (2018). Open Innovation Learning: Theory building on open sourcing while private sourcing. Toronto: Coevolving Innovations Inc. ISBN 978-1-7751672-2-8.
- Ing, David (2018). Sickinger, Richard; Baumgartner, Peter; Gruber-Mücke, Tina (eds.). Wicked problems, systems approach, pattern language, ecological epistemology, hierarchy theory, interactive value: Multiparadigm inquiry generating service systems thinking. Pursuit of Pattern Languages for Societal Change 2017. Krems, Austria: Edition Donau-Universität Krems. pp. 678–734. ISBN 978-3-903150-44-7.
