= ClickSoftware =

American technology company

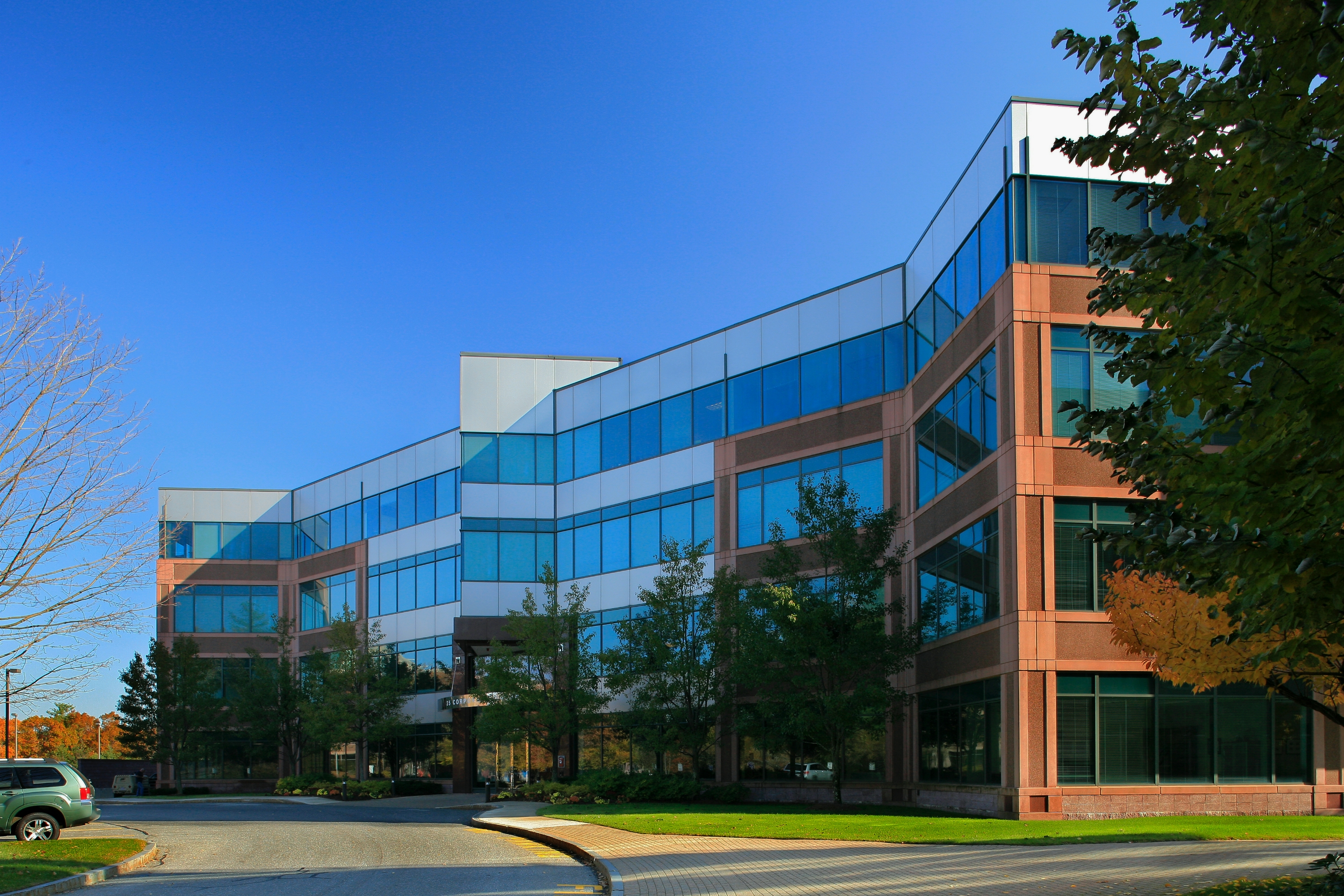
- Type: subsidiary
- Industry: Business software, Field Service Management, Workforce Management
- Predecessor: ClickSoftware Technologies, ClickService Software
- Founded: 1997; 29 years ago
- Founder: Moshe BenBassat
- Defunct: 2019
- Fate: Acquired by Salesforce
- Services: Workforce management, Field service management
- Website: www.clicksoftware.com

ClickSoftware was an American technology company providing field service management software. The company existed from 1997 until being acquired by Salesforce in 2019.

== History ==
=== As company ===
ClickSoftware (previously known as ClickService Software and IET-Intelligent Electronics) was founded in 1997 by former professor and consultant Moshe BenBassat in Givat Shmuel, Israel. The company went public on NASDAQ in 2000, during the peak of the dot-com boom.

At the 2008 Beijing Olympics, the company managed the coordination of hundreds of telecom technicians.

In 2014, ClickSoftware acquired Xora Inc., a cloud-based mobile workforce management company.

On April 30, 2015, ClickSoftware announced signing a definitive agreement to be acquired by private funds managed by Francisco Partners Management L.P., a technology-focused private equity firm, in an all-cash transaction valued at approximately $438 million.On October 1, 2015, Tom Heiser was appointed CEO, replacing Paul Ilse.

On August 7, 2019, Salesforce announced an agreement to acquire ClickSoftware.

=== As software ===
In 2013 ClickSoftware successfully integrated its software with the native Salesforce platform, making its products available on the Salesforce AppExchange.

Upon acquisition by Salesforce in 2020, ClickSoftware’s technology was integrated into Salesforce Service Cloud as a product known as “Field Service Management”.

ClickSoftware reached its end of life with version 8.3 on December 31st, 2023.

== See also ==
- Decision support system
- Service chain optimization
- Field service management
- Enterprise resource planning
- Enterprise mobility management
- Customer relationship management
