= Employee scheduling software =

Employee scheduling software automates the process of creating and maintaining a schedule. Automating the scheduling of employees increases productivity and allows organizations with hourly workforces to re-allocate resources to non-scheduling activities. Such software will usually track vacation time, sick time, compensation time, and alert when there are conflicts. As scheduling data is accumulated over time, it may be extracted for payroll or to analyze past activity. Although employee scheduling software may or may not make optimization decisions, it does manage and coordinate the tasks. Today's employee scheduling software often includes mobile applications. Mobile scheduling further increased scheduling productivity and eliminated inefficient scheduling steps. It may also include functionality including applicant tracking and on-boarding, time and attendance, and automatic limits on overtime. Such functionality can help organizations with issues like employee retention, compliance with labor laws, and other workforce management challenges.

== Purpose ==
A theoretical underpinning of an employee scheduling problem can be represented as the Nurse scheduling problem, which is NP-hard. The theoretical complexity of the problem is a significant factor in the development of various software solutions. This is because systems must take into account many different forms of schedules that could be worked, and allocate employees to the correct schedule. Ultimately, optimization of scheduling is to minimize costs, but also often requires a reciprocal approach from management instead of complete reliance on software.

== Transitioning to employee scheduling software ==
Prior to employee scheduling software companies would use physical mediums for tracking employee hours and work schedule. This then gave rise to data storage forms that later by the 80s were compatible with computer programs and software. These forms however never actually scheduled the employees, it just kept track of the employees work week, hours, and prior work schedules. This then gave way to the idea of employee scheduling software, which would be an all-inclusive system that would store and track employee work history, along with actually scheduling the employee's work week.

=== Punch cards ===
The earliest form of automated employee scheduling and managing of employee hours was the punch card. The idea first created by Basile Bouchon developed the control of a loom by punched holes in paper tape in 1725. Herman Hollerith improved the design. IBM manufactured and marketed a variety of unit record machines for creating, sorting, and tabulating punched cards, even after expanding into electronic computers in the late 1950s. IBM developed punched card technology into a powerful tool for business data-processing and produced an extensive line of general purpose unit record machines.

=== Magnetic tape ===
During the 1960s, the punched card was gradually replaced as the primary means for data storage by magnetic tape, as better, more capable computers became available. Mohawk Data Sciences introduced a magnetic tape encoder in 1965, a system marketed as a keypunch replacement which was somewhat successful, but punched cards were still commonly used for data entry and programming until the mid-1980s when the combination of lower cost magnetic disk storage, and affordable interactive terminals on less expensive minicomputers made punched cards obsolete for this role as well. However, their influence lives on through many standard conventions and file formats.

=== Auto-scheduling and intelligent rostering ===
In the 2010s, the adoption of mobile devices and 3G, 4G, and 5G networks made it possible to approach scheduling differently. Some software solutions made the lives of business owners and managers easier.

The earlier solutions helped small business owners to schedule, manage, and communicate with their employees. The newer solutions use machine learning and are being built on newer cloud technologies.

== Complexity ==
Algorithms are used within the employee scheduling software in order to determine not only who is working, but also the specific jobs and tasks required of the workers. The system still must be monitored, and any further issues with assigning of specifics is done manually. Within the context of roster problems and models, there are three main factors to work out the differences: the integration of days off scheduling with line of work construction and task assignment, roster construction, and demand type. These complexities thusly require that each and every workplace must optimize employee scheduling software based on their own unique set of rules, issues and needs. Additionally, it is difficult to determine optimal solution that minimize costs, meet employee preferences, distribute shifts equitably among employees and satisfy all the workplace constraints. In many organizations, the people involved in developing rosters need decision support tools to help provide the right employees at the right time and the right cost while achieving a high level of employee satisfaction. Due to constant change within work environments, new models and algorithms must be created in order to allow for flexibility as needs and demands arise. For example, when a large number of new employees are hired, as in the total workforce is increased, the scheduling software likely will need to be updated in order to allow for such a change.

== Features ==
Although employee scheduling software won't necessarily improve business practices by itself, it does automate typically tedious business administration. It can also have positive effects on aspects of the business indirectly, including employee engagement, employee retention, and lowered labor costs. By providing management with large amounts of data, this software can assist management in making decisions and automatically create a work schedule that fits as many constraints as possible. Also, the software may be a part of an ERP package or other human resource management system.

Features vary depending on software vendor, but some typical features include:

- Gantt chart or calendar view of the schedule
- Approve employee requests for time off
- Reduce unproductive workforce due to over scheduling
- Use weather forecasts to predict staffing needs
- Days off scheduling
- Allow employees to swap shifts.
- Templates to roll out shift plans over medium term
- Interface to payroll and/or management accounting software
- Ability to easily identify unassigned shifts.
- Ability to create reports for invoicing and payroll.
- Manage the task of automation and data collection.
- Workplace analysis
- Mobile application integration
- Interface agents
- Geo Scheduling

== Future trends ==
As the modern workplace becomes more complex, it is likely that rostering will need to be more flexible to cater to more individualistic preferences. Artificial intelligence also looks to play a bigger role in scheduling software, requiring less oversight by management to correct issues.

== See also ==
- Appointment scheduling software
- Automated planning and scheduling
- Field service management
- Gantt chart
- Meeting scheduling tool
- Schedule (workplace)
- Time tracking software
- Timesheet
- Workforce management
- Applicant Tracking System
- Rostering
