= Service system =

A service system (also customer service system (CSS)) is a configuration of technology and organizational networks designed to deliver services that satisfy the needs, wants, or aspirations of customers. "Service system" is a term used in the service management, service operations, services marketing, service engineering, and service design literature. While the term frequently appears, it is rarely defined.

One definition of a service system is a value coproduction configuration of people, technology, internal and external service systems connected via value propositions, and shared information (language, laws, measures, etc.). The smallest service system is a single person and the largest service system is the world economy. The external service system of the global economy is considered to be ecosystem services. Service systems can be characterized by the value that results from interaction between service systems, whether the interactions are between people, businesses, or nations. Most service system interactions aspire to be win-win, non-coercive, and non-intrusive. However, some service systems may perform coercive service activities. For example, agents of the state may use coercion in accordance with laws of the land.

Another definition for service system states that a service system consists of elements (e.g., people, facilities, tools, and computer programs) that have a structure (i.e., an organization), a behavior (possibly described as a business process), and a purpose (or goal). A service system worldview is a system of systems that interact via value propositions.

A much simpler and more limited definition is that a service system is a work system that produces services. A work system is a system in which human participants and/or machines perform work (processes and activities) using information, technology, and other resources to produce products/services for internal or external customers. Co-production occurs in work systems in which customers are also participants, e.g., many work systems that provide medical care, education, and consulting. (Alter, 2013)

== History ==
Usages of the term service system (bold added) are provided below:

The earliest known usage of the phrase service system in a book title is Stochastic Service Systems by John Riordan.

Usages from Quinn and Paquette (1990) Technology in Services: Creating Organizational Revolutions. MIT Sloan Management Review. 31(2).

"Properly designed service technology systems allow relatively inexperienced people to perform very sophisticated tasks quickly—vaulting them over normal learning curve delays."

Examples: "Domino's Pizza ... industrial engineering and food science research automated the making of a pizza to as near a science as possible, eliminating much of the drudgery in such tasks, yet ensuring higher quality and uniformity. Then, finding that its store managers were still spending fifteen to twenty hours per week on paperwork, Domino's introduced NCR "mini-tower" systems at its stores to handle all of the ordering, payroll, marketing, cash flow, inventory, and work control functions ... Federal Express ... Its DADS (computer aided delivery) and COSMOS II(automated tracking) systems give FedEx maximum responsiveness."

Inferred definition: Service systems, also known as service technology systems, are designed to allow inexperienced people to perform very sophisticated service provisioning tasks quickly.

Usages from Cook, Goh, and Chung (1999) Service Typologies: A State of the Art Survey. Production and Operations Management, 8(3).

"Customer contact is one of the primary criteria used to classify service operations and refers to the physical presence of the customers in the service system during the provision of the service... Service systems can be placed on a continuum that ranges from high customer contact to low customer contact during the creation of the service."

"Capital intensity of the service system also serves as the basis of classification... The capital intensity of the service system ranges from low to high."

"The level of customer involvement in the creation of a service is also a dimension used to classify services... Customer involvement means the level of interaction the customer has with the service system and the level to which the customer can actually affect the service delivery process."

"Customer satisfaction is the most basic concept underlying TQM. It is, therefore, of critical importance that the service system and the services it is designed to deliver satisfy the needs and wants of the organization's customers."

"Not only does one have to consider the implications on product design and how this affects marketing, but is also may have significant implications for the design of the service system. This illustrates the need to address interactions between the marketing and operations functions and to integrate these functions for the betterment of the firm."

"The environment in which a service organization operates will be instrumental in determining how the service system, as well as the services themselves, should be designed... Global service organizations must also appreciate and understand local customers, laws, and culture to successfully operate internationally."

Examples: "Pure services (e.g., health centers and personal services) represent the highest level of customer contact. Progressing down the continuum toward lower custom contact are mixed services (e.g., branch offices of post offices), quasimanufacturing (e.g., home office of banks), and manufacturing (e.g., automobile assembly plants)... ...When a client contracts with an architect to design a home, a relationship involving high customer involvement is created. On the other hand, a customer who has purchased an airline ticket has little opportunity for involvement in the service delivery or to impact how the service is going to be provided."

Inferred definition: Service systems are organizations designed to delivery services that satisfy the needs and wants of the organization's customers. Marketing, operations, and global environment considerations have significant implications for the design of a service system. Three criteria used to classify service systems include: customer contact, capital intensity, and level of customer involvement.

Usages from Lusch, Vargo, and Malter (2006) Marketing as Service-Exchange: Taking a Leadership Role in Global Marketing Management. Organizational Dynamics, 35(3).

"Stated alternatively, service-dominant logic offers opportunity for the organization to focus on selling a flow of service. This would encourage it to determine the optimal configuration of goods, if any, for a level of service, the optimal organization or network configuration to maintain the service, and the optimal payment mechanism in exchange for providing the service. That is, the organization is encouraged to think about the service system."

Examples: "For example, if a heating and air conditioning equipment manufacturer views itself in the temperature control business, then it could decide to sell climate control for a building rather than just mechanical devices. It could charge per cubic foot of climate maintained on a monthly or annual basis and/or through a payment plan involving gain sharing, in which costs are reduced as system performance rises, thus benefiting financially both the firm and the customer. A seller entering into such an arrangement has an incentive to look at everything about the building that will influence heating and cooling costs."

Inferred definition: Service systems are optimal configurations of goods, organizational networks, and payment mechanisms for providing a level of service.

== Topics ==
=== Design ===
Marketing, operations, and global environment considerations have significant implications for the design of a service system. Three criteria used to classify service systems include:

- customer contact,
- capital intensity, and
- level of customer involvement.

Service systems use technology or organizational networks to enable inexperienced personnel to perform tasks. These systems are intended to provide autonomy to employees and customers, often through self-service options.

=== Types of service design ===
Service systems range from an individual person equipped with tools of the trade (e.g., architect, entrepreneur) to a portion of a government agency or business (e.g., branch office of a post office or bank) to complete multinational corporations and their information systems (e.g., Domino's Pizza, Federal Express). Hospitals, universities, cities, and national governments are designed service systems.

The language, norms, attitudes, and beliefs of the people that make up a service system may evolve over time, as people adjust to new circumstances. In this sense, service systems are a type of complex system that is partially designed and partially evolving. Service systems are designed to deliver or provision services, but they often consume services as well.

Every service system is both a service provider and a customer of multiple types of services. Because service systems are designed both in how they provision and consume services, services systems are often linked into a complex service value chain or value network where each link is a value proposition. Service systems may be nested inside of service systems (e.g., staff and operating room unit inside a hospital that is part of a nationwide healthcare provider network).

Service system designers or architects often seek to exploit an economic complementarity or network effect to rapidly grow and scale up the service. For example, credit cards usage is part of a service system in which the more people and businesses that use and accept the credit cards, the more value the credit cards have to the provider and all stakeholders in the service system. Service system innovation often requires integrating technology innovation, business model (or value proposition) innovation, social-organizational innovation, and demand (new customer wants, needs, aspirations) innovation.

For example, a national service system may be designed with policies that enable more citizens (the customers of the nation) to become an entrepreneur, and thereby create more innovation and wealth for the nation. Service systems may include payment mechanisms for selecting a level of service to be provided (upfront or one time payment) or payment based on downstream value sharing or taxation derived from customers who received the benefit of the service (downstream or ongoing payment). Payments may also be in the form of credit (creative arts) or other types of intangible value (see anthropological theories of value and theory of value).

== See also ==
- Customer service
- Customer Service System
- Service network
- Enterprise architecture
- Managed services
- Product service system
- Service
- Service economy
- Services marketing
- Service design
- Service provider
- Service science, management and engineering
- Support automation
- Strategic service management
- Work systems
- Web service
