= Service management =

Business process

Service management in the manufacturing context is integrated into supply chain management as the intersection between actual sales and the customer point of view. The aim of high-performance service management is to optimize service-intensive supply chains, which are usually more complex than typical finished-goods supply chains. Most service-intensive supply chains require larger inventories and tighter integration with field service and third parties. They must also accommodate inconsistent and uncertain demand by establishing more advanced information and product flows. Moreover, all processes must be coordinated across numerous service locations with large numbers of parts and multiple levels in the supply chain.

Among typical manufacturers, post-sale services (maintenance, repair, and parts) account for less than 20% of revenue. However, among the most innovative service-oriented companies, those same activities often generate more than 50% of the profits.

ISO/IEC 20000 is the internationally acknowledged for service management.

== Benefits ==
The main drivers for a company to establish or optimize its service management practices are varied:

- High service costs can be reduced, i.e. by integrating the service and products supply chain.
- Inventory levels of service parts can be reduced and therefore reduce total inventory costs.
- Customer service or parts/service quality can be optimized.
- Increasing service revenue.
- Reduce obsolescence costs of service parts through improved forecasting.
- Improve customer satisfaction levels.
- Reduce expediting costs - with optimized service parts inventory, there is no need to rush orders to customers.
- Minimize technician visits - if they have the right part in hand, they can fix the problem on the first visit.

== Components ==
Generally, service management comprises six different capabilities that companies should consider for optimization:

- Service strategy and service offerings
  - Service strategy definition
  - Service offerings definition and positioning
  - Go-to-market strategy
  - Service portfolio management
- Spare parts management
  - Parts supply management
  - Inventory management
  - Parts demand management
  - Fulfillment operations and logistics
  - Service parts management
- Returns, repairs, and warranties
  - Warranty and claims management
  - Reverse logistics
  - Returns processing
  - Remanufacturing
- Field service management or field force effectiveness
  - Technician enablement
  - Mobility
  - E-learning
  - Activity scheduling
  - Service billing
- Customer management
  - Order management and availability
  - Channel and partner management
  - Customer insight
  - Technical documentation
- Assets, maintenance, task scheduling, event management
  - Remote monitoring
  - Diagnostics and testing
  - Asset management/optimization
  - Configuration management

== See also ==
- Customer service
- Enterprise architecture
- Managed services
- Service (economics)
- Service economy
- Services marketing
- Service design
- Service provider
- Service science, management and engineering
- Service system
- Strategic service management
- IT service management
