= Millennium Systems International =

- Trade name: Meevo
- Type: Privately held company
- Industry: Software
- Founded: 1987; 39 years ago
- Founder: John Harms
- Headquarters: Parsippany, New Jersey, United States
- Key people: Connie Certusi (CEO)
- Products: Meevo salon, spa and wellness business management software
- Number of employees: 200 (2025)
- Website: www.millenniumsi.com

Millennium Systems International is an American business software company whose main product is a software as a service platform for managing salons, spa and wellness businesses called Meevo.

The company is headquartered in Parsippany, New Jersey, with an additional office in Plymouth, Devon in the United Kingdom. John Harms is the company's founder and Chairman.

== History ==
Harms Software was founded by John Harms in 1987. Harms created Millennium software to help salons manage scheduling, record-keeping, and marketing.

As of 2013, the company operated offices in the United States and the United Kingdom. Harms Software changed its name to Millennium Systems International in 2013.

== Product ==
Meevo is the flagship product of Millennium Systems International. The software is used by salons, spas, medical spas, studios and gyms to access business records, manage scheduling and point of sale transactions, track business goals, and generate and meet marketing goals. The software's features include:

- SMS and email appointment confirmations
- Marketing reports on client data and trends
- Management tools
- Loyalty program manager
- Online appointment scheduler
- Inventory management
