= WFO =

WFO may refer to:

- Well-founded ordering, in mathematics, see well-founded relation
- W.F.O. (album), a 1994 album by the thrash metal band Overkill
- Workforce optimization, strategy for managing contact center staffing, processes, and workflows.
- Weather Forecast Office, a local forecasting and warning office of the United States National Weather Service: See List of National Weather Service Weather forecast offices
- Washington Field Office, of the United States Secret Service
- Washington Field Office, of the Federal Bureau of Investigation
- World Federation of Orthodontists
- World Flora Online
