= Spohrer =

Sporher is a surname. Notable people with the surname include:

- Jim Spohrer (born c.1956), American computer scientist
- Lauren Spohrer (fl. 2003), American radio producer
- Al Spohrer (1902–1972), American baseball player
