= Clinicbook =

- Company type: Subsidiary
- Industry: Online booking
- Founded: September 2010
- Founders: Winnie Lai, Robin McFee, and Joel Matsumoto
- Defunct: February 15, 2015
- Fate: Acquired
- Successor: CareCru
- Headquarters: Vancouver, British Columbia, Canada
- Area served: Canada
- Owner: CareCru
- Website: www.clinicbook.com

Clinicbook was a Canadian online healthcare directory and medical appointment booking service. Users could search and review doctors, dentists, massage therapists, and other healthcare providers. The company was acquired by CareCRu in February 2015.

Healthcare clinics could create and edit their own pages on Clinicbook.ca and post information such as operating hours, practitioners' pictures and service areas for patients.

== History ==
Clinicbook was founded in 2009 by the University of British Columbia alumni Robin McFee, Winnie Lai and Joel Matsumoto. The company was based in Vancouver, BC and provided clinic information across Canada.

As of December 23, 2010, there were 60,000 medical clinics listed on Clinicbook.com.

On February 15, 2015, the company was acquired by CareCru and the directory and booking service was integrated with CareCru's offerings.

== Business model ==
Clinicbook aimed to help connect patients looking for healthcare practitioners with practitioners looking for new patients. The service was free for patients while clinics paid a monthly service fee for the booking functionality.

== Recognition ==
In 2010, Clinical Media Ltd., producer of Clinicbook was among the winners of Generator Challenge in Vancouver, a competition presented by the City of Vancouver and Discovery Parks with the goal of supporting some of the city's most promising early-stage tech companies.
