= Service chain optimization =

Service chain optimization is the application of processes and tools that embrace all functions for improving the efficiency, productivity and, eventually, the profitability of service organizations. In this regard, profitability of a service organization is measured by the revenue generated from service demand (in the form of service work orders being carried out), and by the costs due to activity of the enterprise's human resources (who provide the service). Service chains consider the full life-cycle of service demand from early stages of forecasting, through planning, scheduling, dispatch, execution and post-analysis.

Service chain optimization is closely related to the fields of workforce management and field service management; the activity performed by field service resources is managed through the latter while being planned and optimized through the former. This relationship is analogous to the relation between supply chain optimization and supply chain management in the domain of manufacturing. In this regard, the service chain benefits from demand forecasting, resource planning and scheduling, and long term analysis activities similarly to the manner these contribute in the supply chain (being typically managed by ERP systems and optimized by supply chain optimization systems).

== Origin ==
The term "service chain optimization" was coined by ClickSoftware in 1996. ClickSoftware received a patent, US 6.985.872 B2, for continuous planning and scheduling (service chain optimization). The term refers to field service management optimization, workforce productivity, improving customer service, and reducing operating costs.

== Modules ==
Most commonly, a service chain optimization system is made up of the following units:

1. a forecasting module used for:
  1. uploading the historic demand for service tasks;
  2. calculating the estimated future demand for service tasks based on the given historic demand levels (per different business units, geographies and for different time domains);
2. a planning module used for:
  1. uploading the forecasted future demand for service tasks from the former forecasting step;
  2. allocating human resources for covering the estimated future demand for service tasks;
  3. periodically carrying out optimization procedure of said plan allocations;
3. a scheduling module used for:
  1. receiving entries of actual service tasks;
  2. receiving updates to the required manning levels of human resources based on the former planning step;
  3. assigning one or more human resources to fulfil each actual service task in an optimized manner based on the capability of each available service person;
  4. periodically carrying out optimization of previous assignments that have not yet been performed;
4. an analysis module used for:
  1. collecting and periodically analyzing past demand for service tasks;
  2. analyzing the performance of said service tasks and the actual performance levels of human resources;

The cycle is completed by feeding the result of analysis back into the forecasting module.

== See also ==
- Service (economics)
- Service economy
- Strategic service management
