= Service parts pricing =

Manufacturing vs After-Sales

Service parts pricing refers to the aspect of service lifecycle management that deals with setting prices for service parts in the after-sales market. Like other streams of pricing, service parts pricing is a scientific pursuit aimed at aligning service part prices internally to be logical and consistent, and at the same time aligning them externally with the market. This is done with the overarching aim of extracting the maximum possible price from service parts and thus maximize the profit margins. Pricing analysts have to be cognizant of possible repercussions of pricing their parts too high or too low in the after-sales market; they constantly have to strive to get the prices just right towards achieving maximum margins and maximum possible volumes.

The after-sales market consists of service part and after-sales service. These areas often account for a low share in total sales, but for a relatively high share in total profits. The after-sales supply chain is very different from the manufacturing supply chain, and hence rules that apply to pricing manufacturing parts do not hold good for pricing service parts. Service parts pricing requires a different outlook and approach.

Service networks deal with a considerably higher number of SKUs and a heterogeneous product portfolio, are more complex, have a sporadic nature of demand AND have minimal response times and strict SLAs. Companies have traditionally been content with outsourcing the after-sales side of their business and have encouraged third-party parts and service providers in the market. The result has been a bevy of these operators in the market with strict price competition and low margins.

Increasingly, however, companies are realizing the importance of the after-sales market and its impact on customer retention and loyalty. Increasingly, also, companies have realized that they can extract higher profit margins from the after-sales services market due to the intangible nature of services. Companies are investing in their after-sales service networks to deliver high levels of customer service and in return command higher prices for their parts and services. Customers are being sold the concept of total cost of ownership (TCO) and are being made to realize that buying from OEMs comes packaged with better distribution channels, shorter response times, better knowledge on products, and ultimately higher product uptime.

The challenge for companies is to provide reliable service levels in an environment of uncertainty. Unlike factories, businesses can't produce services in advance of demand. They can manufacture them only when an unpredictable event, such as a product failure, triggers a need. The challenge for Service Parts Pricing is to put a value to this customer need. Parts that are critical, for example, can command higher prices. So can parts that only the OEM provides in the market. Parts that are readily available in the market cannot, and must not, be priced to high. Another problem with after-sales market is that demand cannot be stimulated with price discounts, customers do not stock up service parts just because they are on discount. On the up-side, the fact that most service parts are inelastic means pricing analysts can raise prices without the adverse effects that manufacturing or retail networks witness.

These and other characteristics of the after-sales market give Service Parts Pricing a life of its own. Companies are realizing that they can use the lever of service part pricing to increase profitability and don't have to take prices as market determined. Understanding customer needs and expectations, along with the company's internal strengths and weaknesses, goes a long way in designing an effective service part pricing strategy.

== Pricing strategies ==
=== Cost based pricing ===
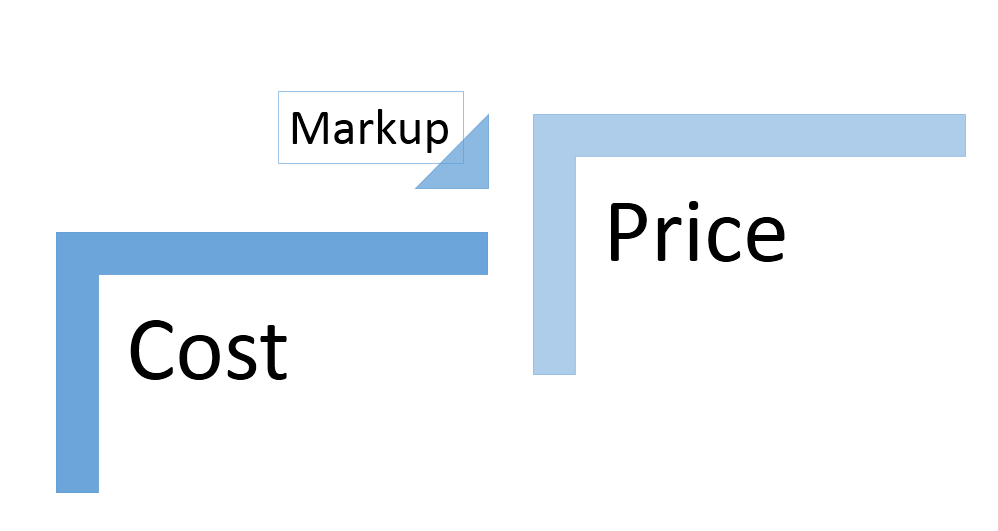

Cost based or cost-plus pricing is the approach of pricing service parts using cost as a base and then adding a standard markup on top to get the price for the service part. Cost based pricing is a popular technique and arguably still the most prevalent in the service parts pricing field. The single most important reason for such widespread popularity is the ease of implementation of this method. Even in case of lack of other information, companies usually have their spare part cost data and find it natural to apply cost based pricing. The second and complementary reason for taking this approach has been a lack of focus on service parts pricing domain for most companies in the past.

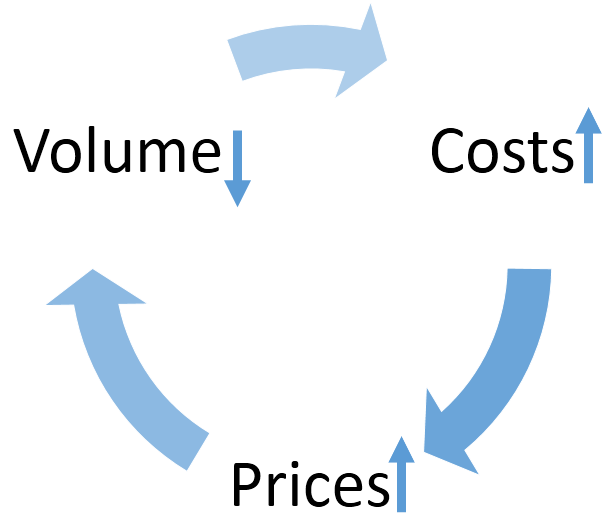
Cost-Volume Death Spiral

Cost based pricing, however, suffers from some fundamental flaws. Firstly, costs are not fixed but fluctuate with raw material prices, purchased volumes, supplier contracts etc. Pure cost based pricing thus causes fluctuating prices which can result in customer confusion, dissatisfaction and demand fluctuations. Although, service parts are less price elastic than their manufacturing counterparts, continued reliance on cost based pricing can ultimately make customers sensitive to price fluctuations – if not to the actual prices then to the frequency of price changes. This can cause demand to start being affected by the frequent price changes, and can even push the company into a death spiral. Secondly, cost based pricing does not take competition into account and may result in severe under or over pricing of service parts relative to the market. This may also result in under pricing of strong products and over pricing of weak ones.

Recent research also shows that cost based pricing can lead to lower than average profitability. When service part prices are set directly from costs, companies basically have no control over their prices and it is in fact the suppliers who control prices. These suppliers might not know the true market conditions and thus might be leading to sub-optimal prices. Relying on costs also means that cost reductions achieved by the purchasing department in a company are passed on directly to the customers and not utilized by the company at all.

Most companies that use cost based pricing realize the pitfalls and try to soften the impact by never lowering prices with cost reductions, but only increasing them when costs run too high. If they encounter price resistance in the market, they deal with it by providing discounts based on customer relationship or order volume or order criticality etc. However, when customers are rewarded with discounts for their price resistance, the resistance becomes more frequent even when the product is valuable for them. Even when used in conjunction with part segmentation on business groups, part lifecycle and part criticality to decide more granular markups on cost, the approach still tends to generate prices that are not simple to comprehend for customers. Customers are used to comparing prices among similar parts from the same company and also across part manufacturers in the market. Exposing them to inconsistent service part pricing runs the risk of losing customer confidence, and eventually the customers.

Cost based pricing is still a useful method for specific categories of service parts. Low volume parts sold once in a product-lifetime have little effect on profitability but do need a price in the market. Such parts can be priced using the cost based approach with slight markups on the cost of the parts. Other examples are standard parts such as bolts and screws that must be priced. These can also be priced simply using cost based approach. A useful case for cost based pricing is that of high-warranty parts. Since these parts do not generate revenue for the company, it makes sense to keep them as close to the actual cost as possible.

=== Internal alignment ===
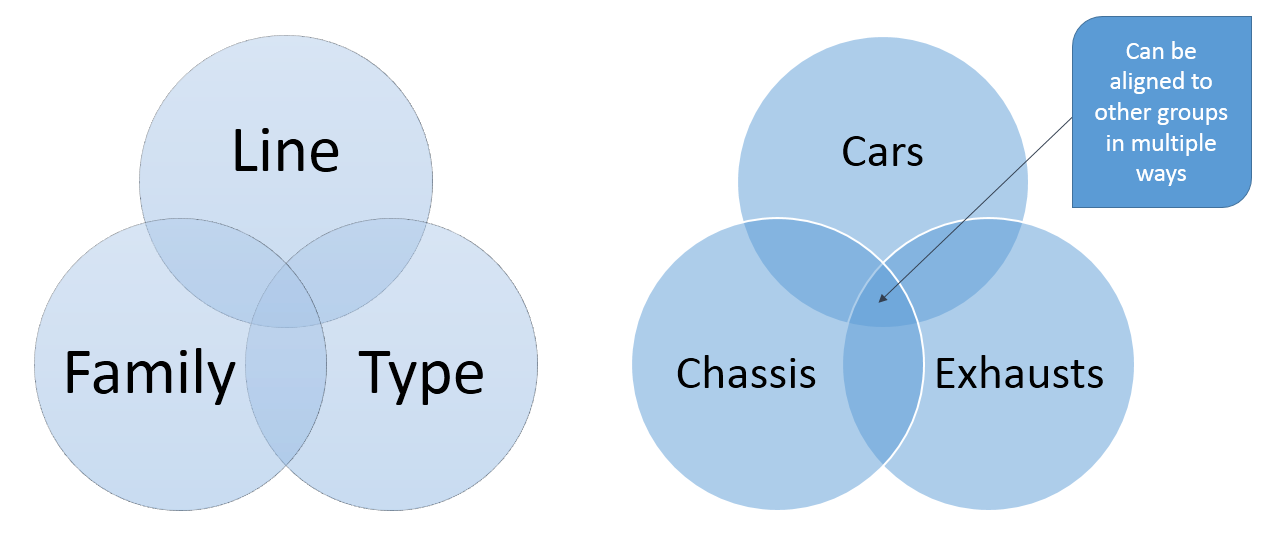

The end goal of internal price alignment is to achieve consistency in pricing and to establish prices that make sense to the end customers. Price alignment to part groups may also show areas to increase prices without causing too much discomfort to the customers. Since the customers expect prices of similar parts to be similar, it may be possible to increase prices for parts that were previously too low.

Exhaust pipes on two different models of car should be similarly priced, for example. If one costs considerably less than the other, due to sourcing location, raw material, bulk contracts etc., it provides an opportunity to increase price and make the price consistent with other exhausts. Similarly companies may decide to have leader-follower relationships between their service parts, and may require followers to derive prices from leaders. Driver door might be the leader and other doors the followers, priced with a slight mark down. Standard floor mats can be leaders and carpeted mats the followers, priced with an additional mark up.

A popular practice is to align the prices of part kits with the service parts that constitute the kit. Kits are usually sold at a discount to increase volumes and to sell together components that companies think complement each other. It is also a mechanism to lock customers to OEM parts and not give them many opportunities to explore third party after market vendors. Customers also need to see the logic in buying a whole kit and generally compare prices of individual components with the price of the kit. For some companies kits compete directly with similar kits in the market and thus need to be handled effectively.

Since the after-sales market needs to service products for the complete life of the product, service contracts for durable goods usually run into many years after the product is sold. Through this time service parts become obsolete and get replaced by new parts. This may happen due to technological advancements, supplier preferences or plain cost constraints on the raw materials being used. The situation is such that as high as 23% of all inventory may become obsolete every year. Companies need to be able to price new service parts as they come in and they need to do this being consistent with the parts being replaced and other internal groups that the part may belong to. In come cases companies may also want to price the replaced part in accordance with the one replacing it. Another usual scenario is to look at the part in the supersession chain that has the maximum holding inventory and align the whole chain to this part. This is done to help burn down the excess inventory of the replaced part, by slightly marking up the other parts for example.

Companies may also apply overarching rounding rules on their service part prices to give a semblance of consistency. Pricing parts ending with 99 cent values, for example, is a common practice. The rounding rules may vary by geography, product lines, or distribution channel depending on company policies. Companies seldom round-down their prices and prefer to only round-up which can provide additional, albeit small, margin improvements on the parts.

=== Market based pricing ===
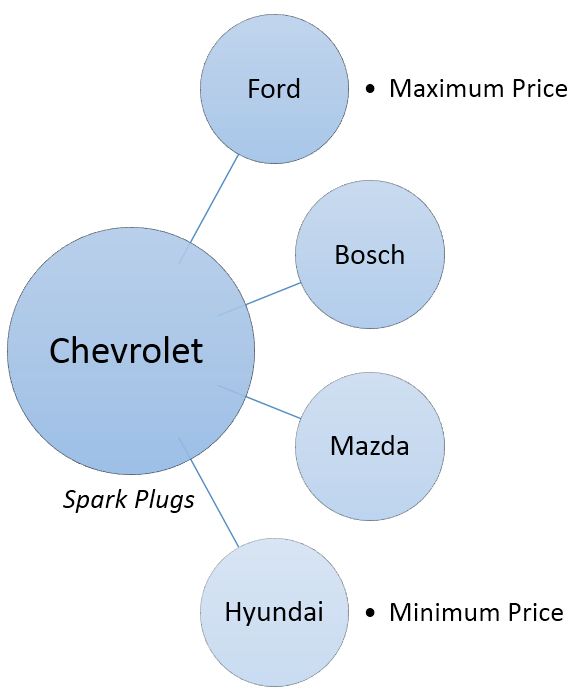

The outward looking pricing methodology for service parts is called market based pricing. Service part prices are based on the competition part prices, where companies try to keep their own prices competitive in the market. Prices might be based on the average price in the market, or the minimum price, or the maximum price among the competition for a service part. Additionally, prices might be marked up or down in comparison to a key competitor in the market. Honda might want to price its headlights solely based on how Toyota prices theirs, and not be concerned about other competitors in the market. This could be because the other competitors are insignificant in the particular market or that Honda is taking a strategic decision to chase Toyota service part prices.

Market based pricing gives companies a means to align themselves to the market at large and gives companies price thresholds to be working in. In highly competitive markets, market based pricing becomes almost essential. Additionally, OEMs segregate their competitive parts from their captive ones and apply market based pricing only on the competitive parts. There may also be instances where companies take a strategic decision to lose money on the competitive parts and cover up on their captive and critical parts. This is usually done to retain market share and customer share of mind.

It is tempting to lower prices to gain market share for companies, but that would not be able to go unnoticed by the competition. Such tactics may lead to short term market advantage but may consequently lead to a downward, value destroying spiral for these companies. The decision to cut prices for market share is especially dangerous in the service parts industry since most parts are not price elastic to start with. Price cuts may do little more than set new expectations on service part prices and never even manage to gain market share. A decision to lower service part prices to undercut the market, in general, may signal poor financial decision making from a company

On the other hand, effective use of market data to find avenues for price increases is a particularly beneficial strategy. Companies might be leaving money on the table by unnecessarily pricing their parts low in some cases and may be able to increase prices without fear of a market backlash. Companies may also be able to benchmark their customer reach and brand value against their competitors, and use this information in conjunction with the market data to decide how much higher or lower they may price their service parts.

Market data that does not look at competitor prices may be in form of customer surveys and attempts to find the customer willingness to pay (WTP). Companies may use this information to decide how much their parts are valued in the market and how much they may be able to charge for them. This approach blurs into the value-based pricing approach in service parts pricing and is most powerful when blended with competition information. However, the problem with this approach is that customers are seldom honest about how much they want to pay.

=== Value based pricing ===
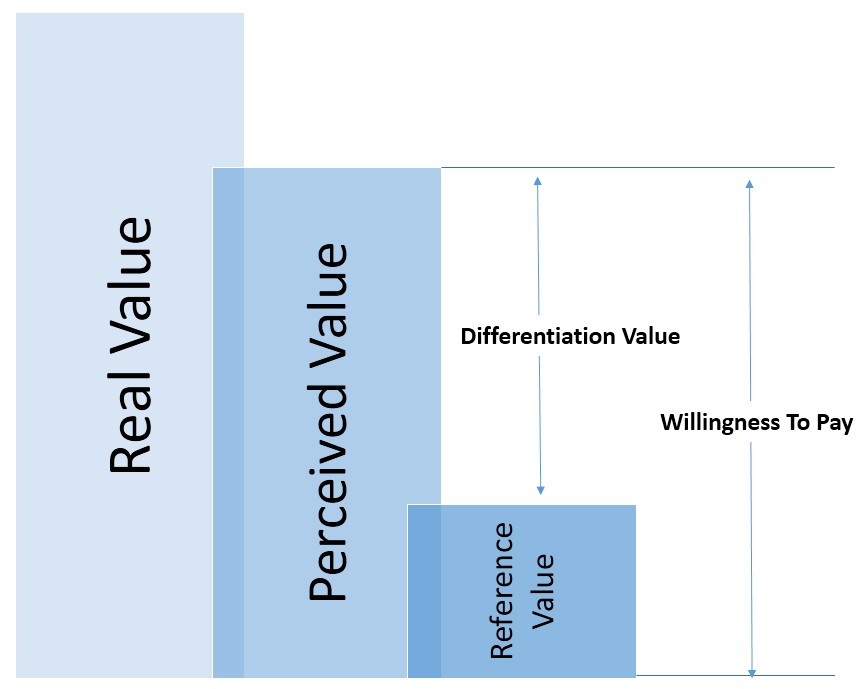

Value or economic value is the benefit that a consumer derives after using a product or a service. In most cases the benefit is measured in terms of currency (money) and hence the name economic value. Economic value is not the same as market price; if a consumer is paying for a product or a service his measure of perceived value from the same could be higher than what he pays for it in the market. The maximum amount (of something, usually currency) that the consumer would agree to pay for a product or service is called willingness to pay (WTP). It follows, therefore, that a consumer would buy a product or a service at the market price when it is lower or equal to his WTP. WTP varies per consumer as the perceived value of the product or service is subjective and may differ substantially from one consumer to another. However, market price for the product or service is the same for all consumers (in absence of price discrimination), and hence consumers whose WTP is equal to or higher than the market price buy it, and the rest decide not to.

Another peculiarity due to the subjective nature of the perceived value of any product or service is that this may vary greatly from the real value that is provided on consumption. For example, the first cellular phones introduced in the market had few early adopters since the perceived value of a phone that could be carried on person was low. Over time, however, cellular phones have proved to be an integral part of human race as a whole and most people consider them a necessity. A contrary case can be made for kitchen appliances that have high perceived value while being bought but deliver lesser and lesser real value over time as they spend most of their time locked in kitchen closets. Cases where the perceived value is lower than the real value of the product or the service are of special interest to marketers and pricing analysts since they provide room for price increases via improvements in product perception in the market (usually through increased advertisement)

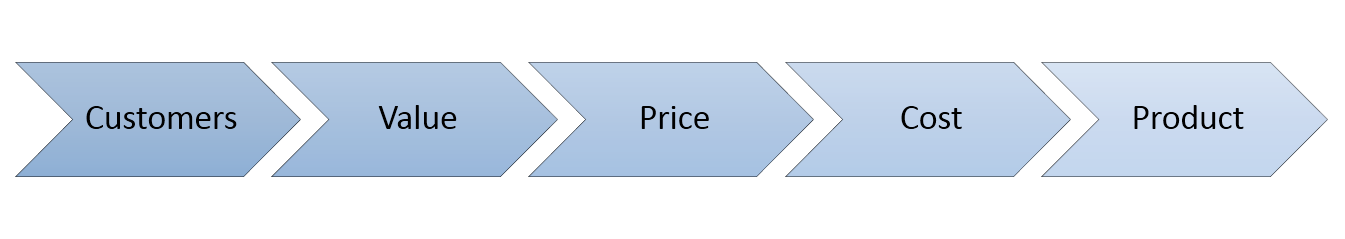
Value based pricing

Value based pricing is an approach that suggests pricing after the consumers' perception of value. This approach completely reverses the process of pricing in contrast to the cost based pricing approach, and is in fact gaining acceptance as a superior method of pricing. Estimating a product's economic value to the customer could be a difficult, but an essential, task for a pricing analyst or a marketer. Economic Value Estimation or EVE is a method that is used to do the same, and requires setting a reference value equal to the cost of the next best alternative to the customer and then adding a differentiation value to get the final price. The differentiation value can be calculated by taking into account what economical benefits the product or service provides over the next best alternative – for example lowering customer's labor cost, providing higher quality product, providing higher product support etc.

For service parts in particular, the differentiation value can be estimated by determining the value drivers and estimating how important these are to the customers. For example, material finish for car alloy wheels can be a value driver that can be estimated, or diameter of the wheel can be used as a value driver. Putting price values to these drivers can be done in multiple ways – focus groups, conjoint analysis, advanced analytics on sales data, or precious old pricing analyst's experience.

Value based pricing decouples part prices from the part costs and thus provides stability to the prices. Combining value based pricing with market based pricing can result in better market segmentation and better targeted prices. Value based pricing may also uncover competitive niches for a company and allow them to command higher margins than their peers in the market.
