= Appointment scheduling software =

Software that allows the management of appointments and booking

Appointment scheduling software or meeting scheduling tools allows businesses and professionals to manage appointments and bookings. This type of software is also known as appointment booking software and online booking software.

== History ==
Appointment scheduling software is a type of computer software designed to facilitate the management and organization of appointments and schedules. It has become an essential tool for businesses and individuals seeking to streamline their appointment booking processes and enhance efficiency. This section provides an overview of the evolution of appointment scheduling software, from early manual methods to modern cloud-based systems.

=== Early beginnings ===
The origins of appointment scheduling software can be traced back to the early days of computer technology. In the 1960s and 1970s, as computer systems became more accessible and sophisticated, organizations began to explore ways to automate various administrative tasks (see also: Digital Revolution (this version)). Initially, appointment scheduling was handled through manual methods, such as appointment books or calendars, which were prone to errors and time-consuming to manage.

=== The rise of electronic scheduling ===
The emergence of electronic scheduling marked a significant milestone in the evolution of appointment management. In the 1980s, computer-based systems started to gain popularity, allowing businesses to store appointment information electronically. These early solutions were typically simple databases or spreadsheet programs that provided basic functionality for storing and retrieving appointment data.

==== Advancements in the 1990s ====
With the advent of personal computers and the widespread adoption of the internet in the 1990s, appointment scheduling software experienced notable advancements. Software developers recognized the need to provide more comprehensive features and user-friendly interfaces. This led to the development of dedicated scheduling applications that offered improved functionality, such as automated reminders, conflict detection, and integration with other software systems through iCalendar.

=== Online scheduling and web-based solutions ===
The 2000s witnessed a significant shift towards online scheduling solutions. The proliferation of the internet and advancements in web technologies allowed for the development of web-based appointment scheduling software. These solutions offered users the convenience of accessing their schedules from any internet-connected device, eliminating the need for local installations and data synchronization. Some website-building platforms, including Wix, Duda, and Hostinger, support appointment scheduling through native features or third-party integrations.

==== Integration and automation ====
As appointment scheduling software matured, developers focused on integrating it with other business tools and automating various processes. Integration with customer relationship management (CRM) systems, email marketing platforms, and payment gateways became common, enabling businesses to manage appointments seamlessly and streamline related activities. Automation features, such as online booking and reminder notifications, further enhanced efficiency and customer experience.

=== Mobile and cloud-based solutions ===
The rise of smartphones and mobile applications in the late 2000s and early 2010s spurred the development of mobile scheduling apps. These apps provided users with on-the-go access to their appointment schedules, as well as the ability to book, reschedule, or cancel appointments from their mobile devices. Additionally, cloud-based solutions emerged, enabling users to store their appointment data securely in the cloud and access it from multiple devices.

==== Modern innovations ====
In recent years, appointment scheduling software has continued to evolve with the incorporation of advanced technologies. Artificial intelligence (AI) and machine learning algorithms have been leveraged to optimize scheduling, minimize conflicts, and improve appointment routing. Virtual assistants and chatbots have also been integrated into scheduling software, enabling automated customer interactions and self-service booking.

Furthermore, the COVID-19 pandemic in 2020 and subsequent social distancing measures prompted the development of new features to support remote appointments and virtual consultations. Video conferencing integrations and telehealth capabilities have become essential components of many modern scheduling solutions.

== Types of software ==
Customer appointment management scheduling software falls under two categories: desktop applications and web-based systems (also known as software as a service or cloud-based systems). Note that many cloud-based software providers offer desktop and web-based appointment scheduling services.

=== Desktop ===
Desktop applications are programs that are usually licensed and installed on end-user maintained computer hardware. Such programs are generally very robust in terms of features and reporting, and can often be customized, but one downside is that desktop applications often do not have an online portal for staff or customer access. As well, installed applications may require ongoing maintenance, support, and upgrading by the end-user.

Desktop-based scheduling applications are often used in environments where data privacy and security are critical. They are commonly found in industries with sensitive data, such as healthcare or finance. Also, businesses that don't rely heavily on remote access or real-time updates may opt for desktop-based solutions.

=== Web-based ===
Web applications are usually provided by a third-party service provider that offers appointment scheduling tools and features as a hosted software solution, usually provided via a web browser. One common benefit is that customers are provided the option of booking their own appointments. This facilitates appointment scheduling over the web as customers can access their usual professionals' schedules at their convenience 24/7 and make appointments online through the Internet. This type of software does not require any update since the updates are directly implemented to the cloud.

Web-based scheduling applications are suitable for businesses and industries that require remote access, collaboration, and flexibility. They are commonly used by companies with distributed teams or when clients need to book appointments from different locations. For example, Upwork has built-in appointment scheduling in both its online interface and its desktop application.

=== Mobile ===
Appointment scheduling mobile apps are available for smartphones. User can browse through the app to look for the most suitable service provider (keeping both quality and budget in consideration) and can request an appointment for the same. Some mobile applications use the same app for both customers and providers while some have different apps for both. Various industries have been using such apps with success.

Mobile scheduling applications are ideal for businesses and professionals who need to manage appointments and schedules while being frequently on the move. Industries like field services, health and wellness, and delivery services often benefit from mobile scheduling apps.

== Features ==
Regardless of whether the application is desktop-based or web-based, most appointment scheduling software has these primary functions:

1. Online availability 24/7
2. Integrated customer relationship management system
3. Ability to monitor the booking statistics
4. Schedule access control
5. Ability to accept online payments
6. Automated reminders and notifications via email/SMS
7. Ability to book meeting room or equipment

Various applications with differing pricing models are available. While the traditional software licensing model of a one-time licensing fee predominates for desktop applications; subscription-based, advertising-based, per-use, fee-per booking and free web-based systems are also available.

== Customer appointment management software ==
Customer appointment management (CAM) software is a type of scheduling system designed for companies with large mobile workforces, streamlining the routing and scheduling of in-home service appointments. Delivered through a software-as-a-service (SaaS) model, it uses algorithms to analyze employees’ work patterns and predict service technician arrival times, often narrowing customer wait windows to around 60 minutes. CAM software is typically browser-based, allowing for remote access and scalability while reducing the need for dedicated IT support and minimizing upfront infrastructure costs.

== Dock scheduling software ==
In the logistics and supply chain industry, appointment scheduling software may also be called dock scheduling software. Dock scheduling software allows organizations to manage and control the flow of shipments to and from dock doors at a plant, production facility, warehouse, distribution center, or shipping facility. Dock scheduling provides a way to manage inbound and outbound loads. Designated appointments are integral to dock scheduling, providing logistics carriers, suppliers, and vendors time slots for where and when shipments should be brought to dock doors.

== See also ==
- Automated planning and scheduling
- Digital calendar
- Employee scheduling software
- Project management software
- Time and attendance
- Time tracking software
- Workforce optimization
