= Business Finland =

Finnish public organization

Coordinates: 60°12′0″N 24°55′35″E

- Innovaatiorahoituskeskus Business Finland; Business Finland Oy
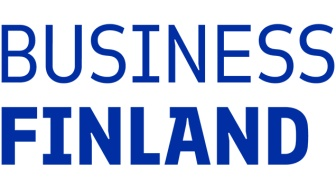

Agency overview
- Formed: 1983
- Preceding agencies: Tekes; Finpro Oy
- Employees: 450
- Agency executive: Lassi Noponen, Director General
- Parent agency: Ministry of Economic Affairs and Employment
- Website: www.businessfinland.fi/en/

Business Finland is a public organization under the Ministry of Employment and the Economy. It was established on 1 January 2018, with the goal of promoting export, foreign investments, attracting tourism, and providing funding for innovations. The organization is made up of two entities: Innovation Funding Agency Business Finland (a government agency) and Business Finland Oy (a government-owned corporation controlled by the agency).

At the start of 2026, Business Finland's international operations on export promotion, including a significant number of employees, were transferred to the Ministry for Foreign Affairs, following a political decision.

Business Finland is part of a public network called Team Finland, which has a broader goal of bringing "together all public internationalization services".

== History ==
The predecessor of the agency was Tekes, the Finnish Funding Agency for Technology and Innovation (Finnish: Innovaatiorahoituskeskus Tekes), while the predecessor of Business Finland Oy was Finpro Oy. Tekes was founded in 1983 through the President of Finland, Mauno Koivisto, who ratified the Act on the founding of Tekes. "Tekes" is derived from Tekniikan edistämiskeskus (Center for Advancement of Technology, also known as National Technology Agency). The centre was founded primarily in response to an economic recession during the 1970s. At its formation in 1983, it employed twenty people. It began researching energy technology in 1995.

In 2009, Tekes invested €579 million in 2,177 projects, of which €343 million was directed to the enterprise projects and €236 million to universities, polytechnics and public research institutes.

In 2018, based on a political decision made by the Sipilä government, Tekes and Finpro Oy, a government-owned corporation for export promotion, were merged together. The target was to streamline business services and make sure that the service chain remains intact for companies going from the R&D phase to exporting. The initiative also sought to gain more investments from abroad in addition to those at home.

== Organization ==
There are 450 experts working for Business Finland in 15 offices in Finland and in 12 locations abroad.

Business Finland's Board consists of individuals familiar with business and different industries as well as a representative of the Ministry of Economic Affairs and Employment. The Board steers, monitors, and supervises the operations of the Business Finland entity and decides on general operational guidelines, taking into account the objectives set by the Ministry of Economic Affairs and Employment as well as the principles and guidelines of state ownership steering. The Board decides on the granting of funding for companies' or organizations' projects that fall within the remit of the funding agency, within the funding authority awarded in the state budget. The Finnish government appoints the Board.

=== The Leadership Team ===
- Lassi Noponen, Director General
- Timo Metsä-Tokila, Executive Director, Funding Services
- Risto Vuohelainen, Executive Director, Growth Services
- Jenni Santalo, Executive Director, Marketing, Communications and Digital Solutions
- Hannu Kemppainen, Executive Director, Insight and Finance
- Teija Lahti-Nuuttila, Executive Director, Director General's Office
- Heidi Elvilä, Executive Director, Talent, Legal and Administration

=== The Board ===
- Chair, Teppo Rantanen, Executive Director, City of Tampere
- Vice-chair, Tiina Korhonen, Head of Department, Ministry of Economic Affairs and Employment
- Paula Eerola, Director General, Research Council of Finland
- Juuso Heinilä, CEO, Finnvera Oyj
- Jarno Syrjälä, Under-Secretary of State, Ministry for Foreign Affairs
- Outi Vaarala, Executive Vice President, Orion
- Maria Wasastjerna, CEO, Kvanted

== Operations ==
Business Finland functions as a funding agency for research and technology development. Receivers of the funding are universities, polytechnics, research institutes such as VTT Technical Research Centre of Finland, the European Space Agency, small and medium-sized enterprises (SMEs), large corporations, and public bodies. In enterprise projects, funding is given to transform research-stage ideas into viable businesses and may combine direct unconditional funding with guaranteed loans conditional on the success of the resulting business.

=== At the Time of Merging ===
Finpro and Tekes merged into Business Finland on January 1, 2018. The staff more or less retained their roles within the newly formed organization, with restructuring only occurring towards the end of the summer. Pekka Soini, the then-Director General of Tekes, became Director of the newly formed organization. Business Finland also launched the website at www.businessfinland.fi on 8 January 2018 where its plans for the future were outlined.

Business Finland remained at the same Tekes and Finpro addresses both internationally and in Finland. At Helsinki it was located at Team Finland House at Porkkalankatu 1.

=== Current Locations ===
Business Finland's headquarters is located at the Team Finland House on Porkkalankatu 1,Helsinki. In addition, Business Finland has 15 regional offices around Finland and 12 international locations.

== See also ==
- Academy of Finland
- Sitra
- VTT Technical Research Centre of Finland
