= Service network =

A service network is a structure that brings together several entities to deliver a particular service. For instance, one organisation (the buyer) may sub-contract another organisation (the supplier) to deliver after-sales services to a third party (the customer). The buyer may use more than one supplier. Likewise, the supplier may participate in other networks. The rationale for a service network is that each organisation is focusing on what they do best.

A service network can also be defined as a collection of people and information brought together on the internet to provide a specific service or achieve a common business objective. It is an evolving extension of service systems and applies Enterprise 2.0 technologies, also known as enterprise social software, to enable corporations to leverage the advances of the consumer internet for the benefit of business. In this case, the service network is designed to benefit from the wisdom of crowds and a human's natural tendency and desire to share information, collaborate, and self organize into communities of common interests and objectives. In business, the value of collaboration is clearly recognized, but the ability is often hampered by rigid organizational boundaries and fragmented information systems. A service network enables businesses to realize the benefits of mass collaboration despite the constraints of modern organizational structures and systems.

== History ==
The world's economy is shifting rapidly from agriculture and manufacturing to services. When the United States declared independence, 90% of the world's economy was on the farm. Today, the services sector accounts for approximately 80% of the U.S. economy. But unlike traditional disciplines like computer science and engineering, innovation and investment directed towards service innovation had historically not kept pace with its growth.

However, in 2007, momentum and investment in service innovation grew dramatically and the creation and evolution of service networks began in earnest along with many other service initiatives.

== Investments in service innovation ==
The term service network is increasingly being used within the context of service innovation initiatives that span academia, business, and government. Some examples include:

- The University of Cambridge and IBM Corporation use the term service network in their discussion paper, "Succeeding through Service Innovation" and describe it within the context of service systems networks.
- Ingres Corporation uses the term service network as a new paradigm in software service to enable Enterprise 2.0 IT service management.
- Openwater Corporation uses the term service network to help describe and brand their product offerings and solutions.

Investments in service innovation include, but are not limited to, service networks.

- Business Week magazine, in an article dated, March 29, 2007, cited Service Innovation as the Next Big Thing.
- IBM is investing heavily in service science, management and engineering (SSME) as a means to bring academia, industry, and governments to become more focused and systematic about innovation in the services sector.
- Universities are beginning to create degree programs around Service Science. Missouri State University and IBM announced on September 19, 2007, the first Bachelor of Science (BS) degree in IT Service Management in the U.S.
- High Tech software companies are beginning to roll out next generation service platforms using service networks.
- Several service consortiums and communities to help drive service innovation across the high technology industry continue to grow. These include the Consortium for Service Innovation as well as the Service, Research & Innovation Community.

== Delivery and usage ==
Service networks are typically delivered as an online or hosted solution, also referred to as software as a service (SaaS) solutions.

== Adversarial service networks ==
It is possible for participants to have adversarial relationships with other members of the service network . For instance, manufacturers may attempt to disintermediate service firms when it is more profitable for the manufacturer to replace a whole product rather than repair it. One example in aviation is how manufacturers of airframes and components attempt to sign service contracts with airlines, capturing in the process the aftersales service market previously operated by maintenance and repair service firms. The result is a network with internal adversarial dynamics.

== See also ==
- Enterprise 2.0
- Service system

== Other sources ==
- Andrew McAfee.Enterprise 2.0: The Dawn of Emergent Collaboration (http://www.wikiservice.at/upload/ChristopheDucamp/McAfeeEntrepriseDeux.pdf) MIT Sloan Management Review Spring 2006, Vol.47 No.3
- Don Tapscott. Wikinomics (How Mass Collaboration Changes Everything) Penguin Books Ltd, First Published in 2006 by Portfolio, a member of Penguin Group (USA) Inc.
- Consortium for Service Innovation. The Adaptive Organization Operational Model (http://www.serviceinnovation.org/included/docs/library/programs/ao_opmodel_v1.4.pdf)
