= Project workforce management =

Project workforce management is the practice of combining the coordination of all logistic elements of a project through a single software application (or workflow engine). This includes planning and tracking of schedules and mileposts, cost and revenue, resource allocation, as well as overall management of these project elements. Efficiency is improved by eliminating manual processes, like spreadsheet tracking to monitor project progress. It also allows for at-a-glance status updates and ideally integrates with existing legacy applications in order to unify ongoing projects, enterprise resource planning (ERP) and broader organizational goals. There are a lot of logistic elements in a project. Different team members are responsible for managing each element and often, the organisation may have a mechanism to manage some logistic areas as well.

By coordinating these various components of project management, workforce management and financials through a single solution, the process of configuring and changing project and workforce details is simplified.

== Introduction ==
A project workforce management system defines project tasks, project positions, and assigns personnel to the project positions. The project tasks and positions are correlated to assign a responsible project position or even multiple positions to complete each project task. Because each project position may be assigned to a specific person, the qualifications and availabilities of that person can be taken into account when determining the assignment. By associating project tasks and project positions, a manager can better control the assignment of the workforce and complete the project more efficiently.

When it comes to project workforce management, it is all about managing all the logistic aspects of a project or an organisation through a software application. Usually, this software has a workflow engine defined. Therefore, all the logistic processes take place in the workflow engine.

== About ==
=== Technical field ===
This invention relates to project management systems and methods, more particularly to a software-based system and method for project and workforce management.

=== Software usage ===
Due to the software usage, all the project workflow management tasks can be fully automated without leaving many tasks for the project managers. This returns high efficiency to the project management when it comes to project tracking proposes. In addition to different tracking mechanisms, project workforce management software also offer a dashboard for the project team. Through the dashboard, the project team has a glance view of the overall progress of the project elements.

Most of the times, project workforce management software can work with the existing legacy software systems such as ERP (enterprise resource planning) systems. This easy integration allows the organisation to use a combination of software systems for management purposes.

=== Background ===
Good project management is an important factor for the success of a project. A project may be thought of as a collection of activities and tasks designed to achieve a specific goal of the organisation, with specific performance or quality requirements while meeting any subject time and cost constraints. Project management refers to managing the activities that lead to the successful completion of a project. Furthermore, it focuses on finite deadlines and objectives. A number of tools may be used to assist with this as well as with assessment.

Project management may be used when planning personnel resources and capabilities. The project may be linked to the objects in a professional services life cycle and may accompany the objects from the opportunity over quotation, contract, time and expense recording, billing, period-end-activities to the final reporting. Naturally the project gets even more detailed when moving through this cycle.

For any given project, several project tasks should be defined. Project tasks describe the activities and phases that have to be performed in the project such as writing of layouts, customising, testing. What is needed is a system that allows project positions to be correlated with project tasks. Project positions describe project roles like project manager, consultant, tester, etc. Project-positions are typically arranged linearly within the project. By correlating project tasks with project positions, the qualifications and availability of personnel assigned to the project positions may be considered.

== Benefits of project management ==
Good project management should:

- Reduce the chance of a project failing
- Ensure a minimum level of quality and that results meet requirements and expectations
- Free up other staff members to get on with their area of work and increase efficiency both on the project and within the business
- Make things simpler and easier for staff with a single point of contact running the overall project
- Encourage consistent communications amongst staff and suppliers
- Keep costs, timeframes and resources to budget

== Workflow engine ==
When it comes to project workforce management, it is all about managing all the logistic aspects of a project or an organisation through a software application. Usually, this software has a workflow engine defined in them. So, all the logistic processes take place in the workflow engine.

The regular and most common types of tasks handled by project workforce management software or a similar workflow engine are:

=== Planning and monitoring project schedules and milestones ===
Regularly monitoring your project's schedule performance can provide early indications of possible activity-coordination problems, resource conflicts, and possible cost overruns. To monitor schedule performance. Collecting information and evaluating it ensure a project accuracy.

The project schedule outlines the intended result of the project and what's required to bring it to completion. In the schedule, we need to include all the resources involved and cost and time constraints through a work breakdown structure (WBS). The WBS outlines all the tasks and breaks them down into specific deliverables.

=== Tracking the cost and revenue aspects of projects ===
The importance of tracking actual costs and resource usage in projects depends upon the project situation.

Tracking actual costs and resource usage is an essential aspect of the project control function.

=== Resource utilisation and monitoring ===
Organisational profitability is directly connected to project management efficiency and optimal resource utilisation. To sum up, organisations that struggle with either or both of these core competencies typically experience cost overruns, schedule delays and unhappy customers.

The focus for project management is the analysis of project performance to determine whether a change is needed in the plan for the remaining project activities to achieve the project goals.

== Other management aspects of project management ==
=== Project risk management ===
Risk identification consists of determining which risks are likely to affect the project and documenting the characteristics of each.

=== Project communication management ===
Project communication management is about how communication is carried out during the course of the project

=== Project quality management ===
It is of no use completing a project within the set time and budget if the final product is of poor quality. The project manager has to ensure that the final product meets the quality expectations of the stakeholders. This is done by good:

- Quality planning: Identifying what quality standards are relevant to the project and determining how to meet them.
- Quality assurance: Evaluating overall project performance on a regular basis to provide confidence that the project will satisfy the relevant quality standards.
- Quality control: Monitoring specific project results to determine if they comply with relevant quality standards and identifying ways to remove causes of poor performance.

== Project workforce management vs. traditional management ==
There are three main differences between Project Workforce Management and traditional project management and workforce management disciplines and solutions:

=== Workflow-driven ===
All project and workforce processes are designed, controlled and audited using a built-in graphical workflow engine. Users can design, control and audit the different processes involved in the project. The graphical workflow is quite attractive for the users of the system and allows the users to have a clear idea of the workflow engine.

=== Organisation and work breakdown structures ===
Project Workforce Management provides organization and work breakdown structures to create, manage and report on functional and approval hierarchies, and to track information at any level of detail. Users can create, manage, edit and report work breakdown structures. Work breakdown structures have different abstraction levels, so the information can be tracked at any level. Usually, project workforce management has approval hierarchies. Each workflow created will go through several records before it becomes an organisational or project standard. This helps the organisation to reduce the inefficiencies of the process, as it is audited by many stakeholders.

=== Connected project, workforce and financial processes ===
Unlike traditional disconnected project, workforce and billing management systems that are solely focused on tracking IT projects, internal workforce costs or billable projects, Project Workforce Management is designed to unify the coordination of all project and workforce processes, whether internal, shared (IT) or billable.

== Summary ==
A project workforce management system defines project tasks, project positions and assigns personnel to the project positions. The project tasks and project positions are correlated to assign a responsible project position or positions to complete each project task. Because each project position may be assigned to a specific person, the qualification and availabilities of the person can be taken into account when determining the assignment. By correlating the project tasks and project positions, a manager can better control the assignment of the workforce and complete projects more efficiently.

Project workflow management is one of the best methods for managing different aspects of project. If the project is complex, then the outcomes for the project workforce management could be more effective.

For simple projects or small organisations, project workflow management may not add much value, but for more complex projects and big organisations, managing project workflow will make a big difference. This is because that small organisations or projects do not have a significant overhead when it comes to managing processes. There are many project workforce management, but many organisations prefer to adopt unique solutions.

Therefore, organisation gets software development companies to develop custom project workflow managing systems for them.

== Literature ==
- Melik, Rudolf (2007). The Rise of the Project Workforce. New York, NY: Willey. ISBN 978-0-470-12430-7.
