= Field force automation =

Field force automation (FFA) is the capture of field sales or service information in real time using communications technology, typically handheld PDAs, wireless devices, tablet PCs or mobile phones. The captured data is transferred immediately to back-end systems (ERP, CRM or accounting systems) through wireless connectivity (Wi-Fi, 3G, satellite or GPRS). This instant capture of information reduces time delays, avoids manual double entry data errors and enhances field force productivity.

From an operations perspective, availability of field information in near real time allows a business to plan delivery schedules, reduce inventory and monitor and control the field workers. Field force automation is seen as beneficial to businesses in regard of customer relations, maintaining skills among the field workforce, and limiting the size of this workforce.

The biggest challenge in field force automation is in developing a simple, but usable, user interface for the hand held device or mobile, and connectivity at the location of information capture. Connectivity can be overcome by having a system which can retain the information captured in the device cache and later synchronize with back-end systems ("thick client").

== See also ==
- Field service management
- Mobile enterprise application framework
- Customer relationship management
