= Schedule (workplace) =

List of employees who are working on any given day

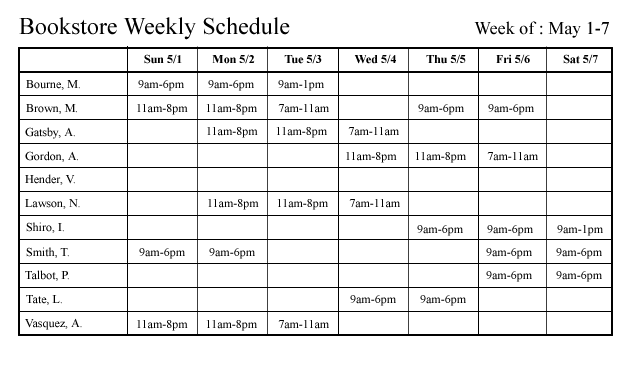
An example of a weekly workplace schedule

A schedule, often called a rota or a roster, is a list of employees, and associated information e.g. location, department, working times, responsibilities for a given time period e.g. week, month or sports season.

A schedule is necessary for the day-to-day operation of many businesses e.g. retail store, manufacturing facility and some offices. The process of creating a schedule is called scheduling. An effective workplace schedule balances the needs of stakeholders such as management, employees and customers.

A daily schedule is usually ordered chronologically, which means the first employees working that day are listed at the top, followed by the employee who comes in next, etc. A weekly or monthly schedule is usually ordered alphabetically, employees being listed on the left hand side of a grid, with the days of the week on the top of the grid. In shift work, a schedule usually employs a recurring shift plan.

A schedule is most often created by a manager. In larger operations, a human resources manager or scheduling specialist may be solely dedicated to creating and maintaining the schedule. A schedule by this definition is sometimes referred to as workflow.

Software is often used to enable organizations to better manage staff scheduling. Organizations commonly use spreadsheet software or employee scheduling software to create and manage shifts, assignments, and employee preferences. For large organisations employee scheduling can be complex, and optimising this is framed as the nurse scheduling problem in operations Research. Advanced employee scheduling software also provides ways to connect with the staff, ask for their preferences and communicate the schedule to them.

== On-call scheduling ==
An oncall shift, or on-call scheduling, is a practice that requires employees to be available to be called onto last-minute shifts without pre-scheduling. In the United States, the practice has been opposed by labor rights groups as "unfair and detrimental to employees."

== Self-scheduling ==
Flexible self-scheduling is a practice used when a manager defines scheduling needs based on demand, but allows employees to select, trade, and fill shifts themselves. Allowing schedules to be created faster, with less effort, and gives hourly employees more control over their work life.

== Fixed schedule ==
A fixed schedule is a workplace scheduling arrangement in which employees work the same set days and hours each week, with little or no variation over time. Both the start and end times, as well as the specific days worked, remain consistent throughout the scheduling period. Fixed schedules can be applied to both full-time and part-time roles across a variety of industries.

This consistency provides several advantages, including increased predictability for employees, which enables easier planning of personal commitments and supports improved work-life balance. It can also contribute to administrative efficiency for employers, as schedules do not need to be changed frequently. Regular work groups or teams can develop stronger collaboration and communication when working together at fixed times. In certain sectors, such as retail, manufacturing, or office-based environments, fixed schedules help streamline operations and foster routine. However, fixed schedules may offer limited flexibility for employees who require variable hours and may not optimally address fluctuating staffing needs in workplaces with unpredictable or seasonal demands. Some employees may also find the lack of variation monotonous over extended periods.

== See also ==
- Field service management
- Gantt chart
- Split shift
