= Spare parts management =

Service parts management is the main component of a complete strategic service management process that companies use to ensure that right spare part and resources are at the right place (where the broken part is) at the right time.

Spare parts, are extra parts that are available and in proximity to a functional item, such as an automobile, boat, engine, for which they might be used for repair.

== Economic considerations ==
Spare parts are sometimes considered uneconomical since:

- the parts might never be used
- the parts might not be stored properly, leading to defects
- maintaining inventory of spare parts has associated costs
- parts may not be available when needed from a supplier

But without the spare part on hand, a company's customer satisfaction levels could drop if a customer has to wait too long for their item to be fixed. Therefore, companies need to plan and align their service parts inventory and workforce resources to achieve optimal customer satisfaction levels with minimal costs.

== User considerations ==
The user of the item, which might require the parts, may overlook the economic considerations because:

- the expense is not the user's but the supplier's
- of a known high rate of failure of certain equipment
- of delays in getting the part from a vendor or a supply room, resulting in machine outage
- to have the parts on hand requires less "paperwork" when the parts are suddenly needed
- of the mental comfort it provides to the user in knowing the parts are on-hand when needed
- The parts are un-economic to be repaired i.e. it's cheaper to discard than to get it repaired

== Cost-effect compromise ==
In many cases where the item is not stationary, a compromise is reached between cost and statistical probability. Some examples:

- an automobile carries a less-functional "donut" tire as replacement instead of a functionally equivalent tire.
- a member of a household buys extra light bulbs since it is probable that one of the lights in the house will eventually burn out and require replacement.
- a computer user will purchase a ream of computer paper instead of a sheet at a time.
- a race car team will bring another engine to the race track "just in case".
- a ship carries "spare parts" for its engine in case of breakdown at sea.

== Measures of effectiveness ==
The effectiveness of spares inventory can be measured by metrics such as fill rate and availability of the end item.

== See also ==
- Cost-effectiveness analysis
- Just in time (business)
- Inventory
- Service management
- Service parts pricing

== Notes ==
1. SD-19 in conjunction with MIL-HDBK-512, Parts Management guidance
2. MIL-HDBK-512 handbook is a guide for Military Acquisition Activities (AA) in the preparation of Requests for Proposals (RFPs) with respect to a parts management program, and will help determine to what extent parts management should be for a given program. It will also identify those elements in a proposal to manage the selection and use of parts.
