= David L. Hawk =

American management theories (born 1948)

- Education: University of Pennsylvania; Iowa State University
- Known for: Climate change; br /> Environmental protection; Construction management; Project management; Engineering economics; Academic tenure
- Scientific career
- Fields: Virtual management; Systems sciences; Governance; Architectural theory
- Workplaces: New Jersey Institute of Technology; Helsinki University of Technology; Stockholm School of Economics; Iowa State University; <[Tsinghua University]

David L. Hawk (born c. 1948) is an American management theorist, architect, and systems scientist, specializing in climate change as environmental deterioration. From 1981 to 2010 he was professor of management in the School of Management at the New Jersey Institute of Technology (NJIT) and professor of architecture at the College of Architecture and Design at NJIT.

== Biography ==
Hawk received a B.Arch. in engineering from Iowa State University in 1971, a M.Arch. and a M.C.Planning in fine arts from the University of Pennsylvania in 1974, and a Ph.D. in systems sciences in corporate planning from the Wharton School, University of Pennsylvania, Philadelphia, in 1979. His dissertation Regulation of Environmental Deterioration was Chaired by Russell L. Ackoff and supervised by Eric Trist. Its research basis was on the 1975 US Legal Order system of regulation leading to climate change and other unmitigated consequences. The research proposed "Negotiated Order" as a more viable way to avoid ethical cynicism found in US trained lawyers and lead to serious reduction in the human impact on the larger environment of the world. Twenty major companies and ten nations helped with the research done via the Stockholm School of Economics. Sweden's Prime Minister presented the results to OECD.

Before starting his academic career in 1974 Hawk worked in industry after serving in the U.S. Army in the Republic of Vietnam from 1966 to 1968. From 1968 to 1974 he had a series of jobs such as design engineer for ACCO Loudon; architectural designer in Darmstadt, Germany; farm manager in Brighton, Iowa; Civic designer and planning officer at Westminster City Council, London, England in 1971-72; and designer and corporate researcher for multiple public and private organizations in the Philadelphia region from 1972 to 1974.

Hawk started working as research associate at the Wharton School in 1974. He was a visiting researcher and faculty member at the Stockholm School of Economics from 1975 to 1977, then a visiting faculty member until 1996. From 1978 to 1981 he was an assistant professor at Colleges of Engineering and Design of the Iowa State University, where he coordinated the graduate studies in Architecture. In 1981 he started at the New Jersey Institute of Technology, was an associate dean in 1983-85 while designing several graduate programs. He became NJIT's only dual professor in 1991 in management at the School of Management, and in architecture at the College of Architecture and Design at NJIT. From 2006 to 2008 he also served as Dean at the School of Management. From 1989 to 1991 he was on leave from NJIT and back at the Institute of International Business of the Stockholm School of Economics, and from 1998 to 1999 was on another leave and with the Helsinki University of Technology

From 1994 to 1996 Hawk was at Bell Labs AT&T as an Industrial Ecology Fellow developing new models for reduced pollution via industrial redesign. In 2001, he was honored as a Master Teacher at NJIT. He serves as Senior Adviser to one of China's largest firms, China State Construction. In 2003 hawk began serving two years on the Congressional Commission set up to study the role of business in government leadership: Committee on Business Strategies for Public Capital Investment, for the National Academy of Sciences.

In 2013 Hawk was fired from NJIT due to alleged ethics violations.

== Publications ==
Books

- Hawk, David Lee (1979). "Regulation of Environmental Deterioration". University of Pennsylvania ScholarlyCommons. Archived from the original on August 6, 2018.
- 1986. Building Economics Research Agenda: Report of a Building Economics Workshop Held at NJIT, May 23–26, 1985. National Science Foundation (U.S.)
- 2004. Investments in Federal Facilities: Asset Management Strategies for the 21st Century, National Research Council of the National Academies, Washington, D.C., report by the Committee on Public Capital Investment.

Articles, a selection

- 1999. "Innovation versus Environmental Protection Presumptions," in: Systemic Practice and Action Research Journal, Vol. 12., No. 4. pp. 355 – 366, Plenum Publishing.
- 1999. "Factors Impeding Project Management Learning," in: International Project Management Journal, Vol. 5, No. 1., with Karlos Artto.
- 2000. "A Question of Context," in: Proceedings of the Helsinki Symposium on Industrial Ecology and Material Flows, Helsinki, Finland, with H. Siikavirta.
- 2000. "Fluid Management in an Open Society: On Organizational Forms and Their Ability to Retain Fluids," in: Proceedings of the World Congress 2000, Understanding Complexity: The Systems Sciences in the New Millennium, Ed., Peter Corning, Institute for the Study of Complex Systems, Palo Alto, CA., with M. Takala.
- 2002. “Approaching Cultural Diversity through the Lenses of Systems Thinking and Complexity Theory", in: Conference Proceedings 46th Annual Meeting, International Society for Systems Sciences, Shanghai, China. Edited by Michael Jackson.
- 2003. “From the Exploration of New Possibilities to the Exploitation of Recently Developed Competencies: Evidence from five ventures developing new-to-the-world Technologies,” with Annaleena Parhankangas, in: Proceedings of Symposium on “The Network Structure of Entrepreneurship and Innovation, Lally School of Management & Technology, RPI, Troy, New York, October 2–3.
- 2003. “Governance and the Practice of Management in Long-Term Inter-Organizational Relations,” Proceedings of the 47th Annual Conference of the International Society for Systems Sciences, Create, 7, 7, 03. pp. 78 – 100. with David Ing and Ian Simmonds.
- 2003. “Mutual Development of Technologies and Governance: Reliance on Systemic Coincidence, Natural Luck or Strategic Planning?” in: Proceedings of the 47th Annual Conference of the International Society of Systems Sciences, Crete. 7,8, 03, pp. 124 –140. with Annaleena Parhankangas.
- 2005. “Negotiated Order and Network Form Organizations,” in: Systems Research and Behavioral Science, Systems Res. 22, 1-22 (2005), Annaleena Parhankangas, David Ing, David L. Hawk, Gosia Dane and Marianne Kosits.
- 2006. “Conditions of Success: a platform for international construction development", in: Construction Management and Economics Journal, July, 2006, 24, 735 – 742.
- 2010. "Economy, Environment, Energy: Worlds Apart, or Three Perspectives on the Same World", in: Reflexive Practice, Kent Myers, Palgrave-MacMillan, September, 2010, 107 - 124.
