= Jim Spohrer =

American computer scientist (born 1956)

James C. Spohrer
- Born: c. 1956
- Education: Ph.D.,1988; B.S., 1978; Yale University; MIT
- Known for: Leading development of service science, management, and engineering (SSMED)

James C. Spohrer (born c. 1956) is a computer scientist best known for having led the development of a new science of service systems, often known as service science, management and engineering.

In spring 2017, Spohrer was named as Director, Cognitive OpenTech for IBM. From 2009 through 2016, he had been the Director of IBM Global University Programs Worldwide. Between 2003 and 2009, he was the Director of Almaden Services Research with IBM at the IBM Almaden Research Center. He was an advocate of the service science, management and engineering initiative across companies, governments and academics. His research group received IBM awards for modeling customers and mapping global service systems including performance measures, costing and pricing of complex, inter-organizational service projects, analytics and information service innovations, process improvement methods, and innovation foresight methods, amongst others. He works with service research pioneers from diverse academic disciplines and he advocates for Service Science, Management, Engineering, and Design (SSMED) as an integrative framework for global competency development, economic development, and advancement of science.

Spohrer was the Chief Technology Officer for IBM Venture Capital Relations between 2000 and 2002. He was a Distinguished Scientist in Learning Research at Apple Computer between 1989 and 1998, where he was a co-inventor receiving 9 patents.

Spohrer received a Ph.D. in Computer Science/Artificial Intelligence from Yale University in 1988. He graduated with a B.S. in physics from MIT in 1978. Spohrer attended Hampden Academy from 1970 to 1974 while growing up in Newburgh, Maine, where his teachers included Stephen King.

== Smarter Planet ==
In 2009, Spohrer was one of the leaders of the IBM Smarter Planet University Jam.

== Service Science, Management, Engineering and Design ==
Spohrer has been a co-editor on a book series on Service Science: Research and Innovations in the Service Economy, including:

- The Science of Service Systems (2011), available electronically
- Service Systems Implementation (2011), available electronically
- Handbook of Service Science (2010) available electronically

Spohrer was lead author in a call for a new "science of service systems" published in Computer in 2007.

An early tie between the service science and systems science communities was established by Spohrer in an address titled "Why the world needs more systems thinkers focused on service systems" at the ISSS 2005 meeting in Cancun.

== Publications ==
- James C. Spohrer, "Today's Jobs Demand an Updated College Education", Huffington Post, October 27, 2010 http://www.huffingtonpost.com/jim-spohrer/todays-jobs-demand-an-upd_b_774244.html
- Jim Spohrer, Paul P. Maglio, John Bailey, and Daniel Gruhl. 2007. "Steps Toward a Science of Service Systems." Computer 40 (1) (January): 71–77. doi:10.1109/MC.2007.33.
- Partial lists of research publications by James C. Spohrer can be found on academia.edu and on DBLP.
