= Strategic service management =

Strategic service management (SSM) is a business strategy that aims to optimize the post-sales service that a company provides, by synchronizing service parts and resources forecasting, service partners, workforce technicians, and service pricing. Benefits of strategic service management can include:

- Increased revenue through the servicing of manufactured products that may be experiencing decreased sales
- Increased customer loyalty through improved post-sale service performance
- Heightened asset accountability and tracking
- Increased worker productivity
- More knowledgeable workers to prevent common mistakes

Using strategic service management, Avaya reduced service parts inventory from $250 million to $160 million, Sun Microsystems saved $40 million in the first year, and Dell grew service revenues over 20% in one year.

== See also ==
- Command center
- Field service management
- Service parts pricing
- Spare parts management
- Workforce management
