= Workforce management =

Approach to optimizing staff in a workplace

Workforce management (WFM) is a process for corporate leaders and managers to optimize and encourage productivity, competency, and employee engagement. Generally, it relies on software to help those leaders plan out a business's needs and execute work more effectively than through a spreadsheet. WFM typically includes all of the activities needed to maintain a modern, productive workforce: human resource management, performance and training management, budgeting, forecasting, and scheduling.

While WFM has traditionally focused on so-called "operational efficiency" and cost reduction, the process has expanded in recent years to provide flexible work arrangements and reduce attrition, particularly for frontline or hourly workers.

== Core components ==
Workforce management as a concept developed from traditional staff scheduling or rostering practices, which are designed to improve time management. From those early roots, it has become more integrated and demand-oriented based on the needs of staff and unionized workers. WFM practices can further help organizations comply with labour standards and union agreements, since non-compliance can expose employers to fines and litigation. Some researchers and futurists contend that AI integrated into WFM software will help employees and managers work more efficiently by reducing cognitive load.

Core processes of WFM software often incorporate:

- Forecasting and budgeting: To determine the required workload and number of staff based on historical data (such as sales figures or customer contacts).
- Scheduling: This includes automating and basing schedules or rosters on staffing requirements, peak loads, skills, labor laws, and contractual terms.
- Performance management: Measuring worker performance, providing feedback and coaching, managing incentives and providing online training within the software.
- Time and attendance: Capturing time-worked data for payroll and managing working time accounts.
- Process analysis: Monitoring and analyzing the entire WFM process to find efficiencies.

== Employee experience ==
Companies often end up adopting WFM software and practices to accommodate shift-based staff or hourly workers who generally don't have corporate email addresses. This includes providing those employees with apps or tools that enable:

- Flexible scheduling: To swap shifts, self-schedule, punch in and punch out digitally.
- Employee communications: So that staff can chat with each other, receive updates from management, and share information related to work.
- Sentiment capture: Using pulse surveys to measure employee sentiment at key moments (e.g., after onboarding or a promotion) to improve the work environment.

=== Schedule stability and predictability ===
Studies have shown that the stability which comes from scheduling shifts through WFM apps leads to benefits for workers and their employers. In the Stable Scheduling Study, a randomized controlled field experiment carried out at 28 Gap stores and published in 2018 by researchers associated with the Center for WorkLife Law and the University of Chicago, stores that gave hourly retail workers more consistent and predictable schedules recorded a 7% increase in median sales and a 5% rise in labor productivity compared with control stores. Subsequent analysis of the same experiment reported that more predictable schedules were also associated with improved sleep quality among the workers studied.

== Market growth ==
In the 1980s and 1990s, enterprise software investment focused on topics like: supply chain management, production planning, and enterprise resource planning. As labour costs and workforce complexity grew, organizations gave increasing attention to personnel, and workforce management became an established category of business software in industries such as healthcare, retail, and manufacturing

In manufacturing, labour shortages and skills gaps have intensified interest in workforce planning; a study by Deloitte and the Manufacturing Institute projected that as many as 2.1 million manufacturing jobs in the United States could go unfilled by 2030. Market-research firms estimate the global market for workforce management software in the single-digit billions of US dollars; one 2026 estimate placed it at approximately US$9.8 billion, with continued growth forecast through the end of the decade.

== Delivery models ==
WFM systems can be delivered in three ways: as an on-premises system (where software is installed on a business's own servers), a hosted system (managed by an outside provider), or as a cloud-based computing service (Software as a Service, or SaaS). While many large enterprises historically used on-premises systems, cloud-based solutions have become the standard for modern WFM.

As society continues to adopt new technologies such as smartphones and enterprise mobility tools, more companies are allowing employees to become mobile. Mobile workforce management refers to software and services used to manage employees who work outside company premises, such as field teams, and can include device management, tracking, dispatch, and communications.

The need for social distancing imposed by the COVID-19 pandemic has brought about major changes in both employer's and employee's vision of remote work, which will likely have a long-lasting impact on workforce organization and management in the coming years.

== See also ==
- Medical outsourcing
- Meeting scheduling tool
- Project workforce management
- Project management
- Strategic service management
- Time and attendance
- Time tracking software
- Workforce optimization
- Employee Scheduling Software
- Timesheet

== Sources ==
- AMR Research, 2006: The Human Capital Management Applications Report, 2005–2010: "AMR Research Releases Report Showing Human Capital Management and Customer Management as Fastest-Growing Enterprise Application Segments at 10%".
- DMG Consulting: 2009 Contact Centre Workforce Management Market Report: "DMG Consulting: Workforce Management Market Grew 7.4 Percent in 2008".
- Workforce Asset Management Book of Knowledge (John Wiley & Sons Publishing, 2013): Disselkamp, Lisa, ed. (2013). Workforce Asset Management Book of Knowledge. doi:10.1002/9781118636442. ISBN 9781118636442.
- Portage Communications, LLC: "Erlang Calculations Compared to Simulation Methods for Workforce Management". 20 July 2016.
