= Field service management =

Type of management

Field service management (FSM) refers to the management of a company's resources employed at or en route to the property of clients, rather than on company property. Examples include locating vehicles, managing worker activity, scheduling and dispatching work, ensuring driver safety, and integrating the management of such activities with inventory, billing, accounting, and other back-office systems. FSM most commonly refers to companies that need to manage installation, service, or repairs of systems or equipment. It can also refer to software and cloud-based platforms that aid in field service management.

== Industry examples ==
Field service management is used to manage resources in several industries.

- In telecommunications and cable industry, technicians install cable or run phone lines into residences or business establishments.
- In healthcare, mobile nurses who provide in-home care for the elderly or disabled.
- In gas utilities, engineers are dispatched to investigate and repair suspected leaks.
- In heavy engineering, mining, industrial and manufacturing, technicians dispatched for preventative maintenance and repair.
- In property maintenance, including landscaping, irrigation, and home and office cleaning.
- In the HVAC industry, technicians have the expertise and equipment to investigate units in residential, commercial, and industrial environments.
- In the postal and packaging industry, technicians find out the exact locations of the customers and deliver/receive the packages.
- In manufacturing industries, field agents can schedule maintenance tasks, track equipment performance, and manage service requests for machinery and production systems.
- Companies in transportation and logistics can optimize the scheduling and routing of delivery vehicles, manage vehicle maintenance, and monitor the movement of goods in the field.

== Software ==
FSM software has significantly evolved in the past 10 years, however, the market for FSM software remains fragmented. The software can be deployed both on-premises or as a hosted or cloud-based system. Typically, FSM software is integrated with backend systems such as service management, billing, accounting, parts inventory, and other HR systems.

The large majority of FSM companies are fee-for-service and offer different features and functionality that vary from one company to the next. Whereas one company will provide most, if not all, of the desirable features in field service management, another will be missing one or up to several functions. Pricing is dependent on several factors: a company's size, business needs, number of users, carrier selection, and planned data usage. Some popular fee structures are pay-per-franchise, pay-per-use/administrators, and pay-per-field technician/employee. Costs can range from $20.00 per month for an unbundled solution that does not include carrier data charges to upwards of $200.00. It is not uncommon, although not always the case, for there to be other fees incurred with the use of the FSM platform; namely, fees for software, extra technical support, and additional training.

For the enterprise market, Gartner estimates that market penetration for field service applications has reached 25% of the addressable market. Software sales in the FSM market can only be approximated. Gartner's research puts the revenue for packaged field service dispatch and workforce management software applications, not including service revenue, at approximately $1.2 billion in 2012, with a compound annual growth rate of 12.7%.

=== Mobility ===
Companies are using mobile computing to improve communication with the field, increase productivity, streamline work processes, and enhance customer service and loyalty. Field service software can be used for scheduling and routing optimization, automated vehicle location, remote vehicle diagnostics, driver logs and hours-of-service tracking, inventory management, field worker management, and driver safety. Mobile software may use databases containing details about customer-premises equipment, access requirements, and parts inventory. Some field service management software integrates with other software such as accounting programs.

Mobility can:

- Provide real-time analysis of mobile work status
- Increase the first-time-fix rate
- Reduce overhead or administration costs of paper-based field service management and data entry
- Preserve e-audit trail for full regulatory compliance
- Increase productivity
- Shorten billing cycles

== See also ==
- Enterprise asset management
- CMMS
- Computer-assisted dispatch
- Field force automation
- Mobile enterprise application framework
- Service chain optimization
- Service management
- Strategic service management
- Workforce management
