= Workforce optimization =

Business strategy

Workforce optimization (WFO) is a business strategy that integrates business performance considerations with workforce management. The strategy involves automating processes, data visibility, compliance on legislation and solving business problems related to staffing. It is used by call centers to improve workforce management and agent performance.

== Description ==
Workforce optimization uses all aspects of the complete workforce management life-cycle and provides key insights into how its workforce is performing, with a focus on customer experience. Workforce optimization includes automating entire processes, making key data more visible to support better decision-making, ensuring compliance on relevant legislation and solving business problems related to staff. It is used by contact centers to make convenient communication with customers, such as text messaging support.

The strategy ties together the human resources, operations and IT departments of a business. Workforce optimization manages the performance of staff to understand the impact on both operational efficiency and the customer experience. Companies use VoC insights to improve customer experience, which increases the effectiveness of its agents and builds customer loyalty.

== Development ==
DMG Consulting's 2014 "Contact Center Workforce Optimization Market Share Report" documented an increase in workforce optimization revenue over the 2013 fiscal year. It noted an increase in investments to improve core solutions as well as improvements in back-office and branch workforce optimization solutions. In 2015, DMG Consulting found a resurgence in workforce management due to innovation in usability and functionality through speech and text analytics, desktop analytics and customer journey analytics applications. It also considered a shift in the workforce optimization market to emphasize enterprise analytics that personalize customer interaction.

To make strategic decisions in the modern and complex business landscape, organizations are also using Big Data and Analytics for workforce planning. 80% of executives acknowledge their big data investments are successful, and almost half say their organizations can measure the benefits from their projects. According to Harvard Business Review, organizations that excel in data-driven decision-making are more productive and more profitable than their competitors. Maximizing workforce utilization for Access control systems in presence of security constraints continues to be explored.

== See also ==
- Workforce casualisation
