= Time and attendance =

Employee monitoring system

Time and attendance systems (also known as T&A systems) are used to track and monitor when employees start and stop work. A time and attendance system enables an employer to monitor their employees' working hours and late arrivals, early departures, time taken on breaks and absenteeism. It also helps to control labor costs by reducing over-payments, which are often caused by paying employees for time that are not working, and eliminates transcription error, interpretation error and intentional error. T&A systems can also be used to ensure compliance with labor regulations regarding proof of attendance.

== Manual systems ==
Traditionally manual systems were used that rely on paper cards which have times stamped onto them using a time stamping machine. Such machines were used for over a century but have since been phased out and replaced with cheaper automated systems which eliminate the need for payroll staff to manually input employee hours.

== Automated systems ==
Modern automated time and attendance systems require employees to touch or swipe to identify themselves and record their working hours as they enter or leave the work area. Originally this consisted of using a RFID electronic tag, a barcode or a QR Code badge but these have been replaced by biometrics (vein reader, hand geometry, fingerprint, or facial recognition), and touch screens devices.

== Application and systems-based clocking ==
The latest technology enables employees to clock in from all devices such as PCs, tablets and mobiles using an App or a QR code Clocking using a mobile phone enables geofencing which allows an employee to clock in & out only when they are within an internet geolocation. Facial recognition systems are also available with these app-based software technologies, eliminating the need of fingerprint scanners.

== See also ==
- Comparison of time-tracking software
- Time tracking software
- Workforce management
