= Service science, management and engineering =

Term introduced by IBM

Service science, management, and engineering (SSME) is a term introduced by IBM to describe an interdisciplinary approach to the study and innovation of service systems. More precisely, SSME has been defined as the application of science, management, and engineering disciplines to tasks that one organization beneficially performs for and with another. SSME is also a proposed academic discipline and research area that would complement – rather than replace – the many disciplines that contribute to knowledge about service. The interdisciplinary nature of the field calls for a curriculum and competencies to advance the development and contribution of the field of SSME.

== Service systems ==
Service systems are designed and constructed, are often very large, and, as complex systems, they have emergent properties. This makes them an engineering kind of system (in MIT's terms). For instance, large-scale service systems include major metropolitan hospitals, highway or high-rise construction projects, and large IT outsourcing operations in which one company takes over the daily operations of IT infrastructure for another. In all these cases, systems are designed and constructed to provide and sustain service, yet because of their complexity and size, operations do not always go as planned or expected, and not all interactions or results can be anticipated or accurately predicted.

As the world becomes more complex and uncertain socially and economically, a computational thinking approach has been proposed to model the dynamics and adaptiveness of a service system, aimed at fully leveraging today's ubiquitous digitized information, computing capability and computational power so that the service system can be studied qualitatively and quantitatively.

SSME has been used to describe higher education as a service delivered by colleges and universities that are viewed as complex systems.

== Service Science ==
SSME is often referred to as service science for short. The flagship journal Service Science is published by the professional association INFORMS. The journal publishes innovative and original papers on all topics related to service, including work that crosses traditional disciplinary boundaries.

== See also ==
- Customer service
- Enterprise architecture
- Managed services
- Secure Operations Language
- Service (economics)
- Service design
- Service dominant logic (marketing)
- Service economy
- Service management
- Services marketing
- Service provider
- Viable systems approach
- Web service
