= Nuisance call =

Unwanted, unsolicited, telephone call

A nuisance call is an unwanted and unsolicited telephone call. Common types of nuisance calls include prank calls, telemarketing calls, and silent calls. Obscene phone calls and other threatening calls are criminal acts in most jurisdictions, particularly when hate crime is involved.

Unsolicited calls may also be used to initiate telephone frauds. Fax machines may also receive junk faxes via unsolicited calls.

Caller ID provides some protection against unwanted calls, but can still be turned off by the calling party. Even where end-user caller ID is not available, calls are still logged, both in billing records at the originating telco and via automatic number identification, so the perpetrator's phone number can still be discovered in many cases. However, these do not provide complete protection: harassers can use payphones and, in some cases, caller ID (but not necessarily automatic number identification itself) can be spoofed or blocked. Mobile telephone abusers can (at some cost) use "throwaway" mobile phones or SIMs. Voice over IP users may send bogus caller ID or route calls through servers in multiple countries. Even in these cases, with sufficient law enforcement and telco effort, persistent abusers can often be tracked down by technical means. Call screening is another countermeasure against unsolicited calls.

Most telephone companies have a department devoted to handling complaints regarding unsolicited phone calls. In criminal cases such as obscene or threatening phone calls, many police departments have dedicated resources devoted to dealing with such cases. In the United Kingdom, the communication regulator Ofcom offers a service to report on silent calls while the Telephone Preference Service (TPS) allows consumer to register on a do-not-call-list for marketing calls.

On December 19, 2018, the Canadian Radio-television and Telecommunications Commission (CRTC) announced that beginning December 19, 2019, phone providers will be required to impose universal, network-level filtering of all calls that "[purport] to originate from telephone numbers that do not conform to established numbering plans".

== See also ==
- Do not call list
- False alarm
- Misdialed call
- Pocket dialing
- Robocall
- Telephone fraud
- Verbal abuse
