= Cold calling =

Form of business solicitation

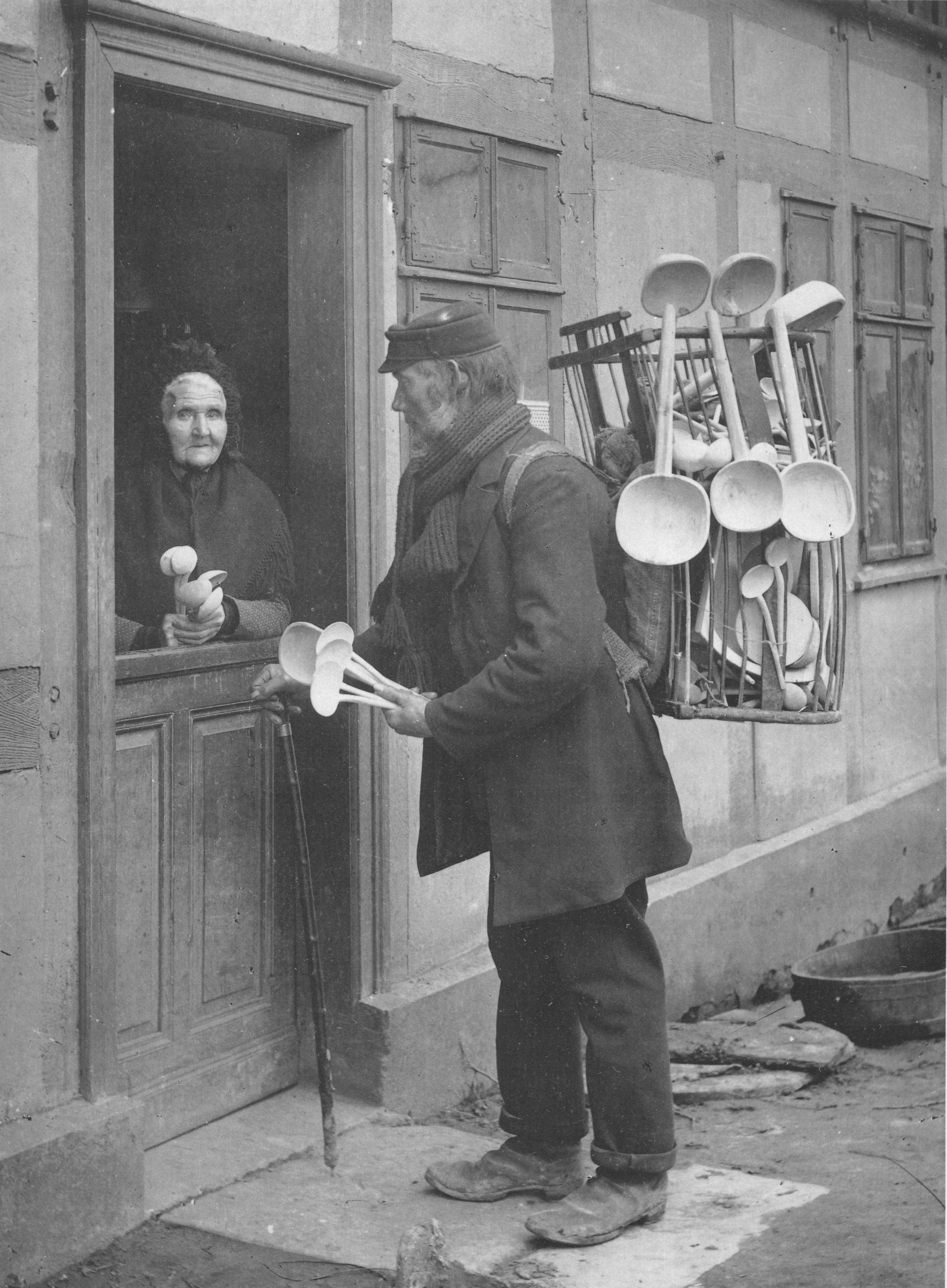
Cold calling in 1905

Cold calling is the solicitation of business from potential customers who have had no prior contact with the salesperson conducting the call. It is an attempt to convince potential customers to purchase the salesperson's product or service. Generally, it is an over-the-phone process, making it a form of telemarketing, but can also be done in-person by door-to-door salespeople. Though cold calling is common as a legitimate business technique, scammers can use cold calling as well.

Cold calling allows businesses to reach new customers at low cost, and has a particular advantage of tending to involve key decisionmakers early in the process. It opens access to new markets and relationships. On the other hand, prospects tend to consider the technique intrusive, and it is relatively inefficient and fatiguing for the soliciting salesperson.

== Evolution ==
Cold calling has developed from a form of giving sales pitch using a script into a targeted communication tool. Salespeople call from a list of potential customers that fit certain parameters built to help increase the likelihood of a sale. This modern cold calling, sometimes called "warm calling", tries to "dig deeply to understand" the potential customer.

== Criticisms ==
With the development of newer technology and the Internet, cold calling has gained some criticism. Jeffrey Gitomer wrote in a 2010 article for The Augusta Chronicle that "the return on investment on cold calling is under zero." Gitomer believes that cold calling will only annoy customers and will not attract business. Gitomer also believes that referral marketing is a better form of selling and marketing. According to Gitomer, there are "2.5 basic understandings of a cold call":

- Cold calling is the lowest percentage sale call.
- Cold calling has a very high rejection rate.
- Multiple rejections can change the salesperson's mentality and make it more difficult to act friendly and complete calls.
- Since the rise of the Internet, social media and instant text messaging, a significant portion of people tends to prefer texting over calling and ignores incoming phone calls from unfamiliar numbers.

Cold calling has also been used by scammers. One such example was when groups of impostors posed as members of the Microsoft support team. The impostors called several homes from a database of Microsoft owners. The Microsoft customers were then told that there was a virus on their computers, and in order to fix it, they had to download a specific program. The program gave access to the computer files for the impostors. Cold calling has been a hallmark in the proliferation of boiler room scams selling fraudulent investment and sports betting schemes from Australia's Gold Coast.

== Rules and regulations ==
Many countries have rules and regulations that limit and control how, when and whom companies can cold call. These rules and regulations are often implemented by government bodies that deal with telecommunication laws in their specific country.

=== United States ===
The United States telecommunication laws are developed and enacted by the Federal Trade Commission (FTC). The FTC aims to "puts consumers in charge of the number of telemarketing calls they get at home". The United States, along with many individual states, have enacted various "Do Not Call" lists. These lists are based on the national US Do Not Call List which was enacted in 2003. Every month, since January 2005, companies are required by law to check the "Do Not Call List" database. They are required to remove the registered numbers from their leads lists. However the "Do Not Call List" has certain limitations. Even if a person is registered for the "Do Not Call List", certain organizations can still call. These organizations include:

- Telephone surveyors, charities, and political organizations
- Organizations that one has had a business relationship with over the previous 18 months
- Any company one has given written permission

The FTC has also set certain regulations on when one can be called. Cold calling can only be done in between 8 a.m. and 9 p.m. The caller is also required by law to tell the customer who they are and what organization they represent. This includes clarifying if the organization is a for-profit organization or charity. The salesperson also must reveal all information about the product they are selling. This means that they are legally required not to lie.

Many other government organizations monitor cold calling within their jurisdiction including the U.S. Securities and Exchange Commission (SEC). The SEC specializes in monitoring cold calling that deals with stocks, specifically stockbrokers. When investing over the phone, the SEC states that written banking information must be given. This means that an investment cannot be made over the phone.

==== Restrictions from US on use of artificial intelligence when cold calling ====
As of February 2024, the FCC has banned the use of AI-generated voices and potentially AI-generated text messages in telemarketing and cold calling, with violations posing significant legal liabilities for businesses who violate the new regulations set forth.

=== Canada ===
The National Do Not Call List (DNCL) is administered by the Canadian Radio-television and Telecommunications Commission (CRTC). As with the U.S. version, the rules exclude surveyors, charities, political organizations/candidates, organizations that one has had a business relationship with over the previous 18 months or has otherwise granted permission, as well as newspapers seeking subscribers.

=== United Kingdom ===
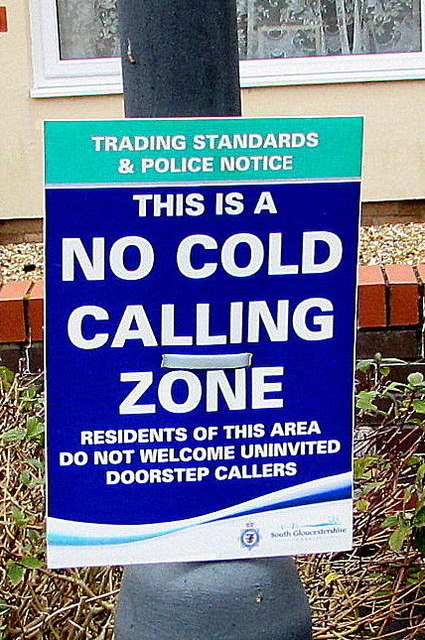
No Cold Calling Zone in Pucklechurch, England

The United Kingdom has its own version of the "Do Not Call List" known as the Telephone Preference Service (TPS). Any citizen of the United Kingdom can register for the list that aims to eliminate its participants from receiving unsolicited calls from organizations including charities and political parties unlike the United States and Canada. TPS was first enacted in 1999 and eventually saw changes in 2003 that ultimately created the Privacy and Electronic Communications (EC Directive) Regulations 2003. While the TPS prevents unsolicited sales and marketing calls, it does not prevent "recorded/automated messages, silent calls, market research, overseas companies, debt collection, scam calls" according to the TPS website.

In 2012, Richard Herman from Middlesex sent an invoice to a company for the time they had kept cold-calling him. He eventually took the company to the small claims court, leading to the company settling out of court. He had been phoned several times by the company despite being listed with the Telephone Preference Service.

=== Australia ===
Australia has its own version of the "Do Not Call List" known as the Do Not Call Register. The "Do Not Call Register" is under the jurisdiction of the Australian Communications and Media Authority (ACMA) which acts as the supreme telecommunications authority in Australia. Registering for the "Do Not Call Register" prevents telemarketers and fax marketers from contacting registered members. Registration for the program is free and will last for eight years. Similar to other countries, there are exceptions to the "Do Not Call Register". These exceptions include: political parties, charities and educational institutions. The "Do Not Call Register" takes effect 30 days after registration.

=== Republic of Ireland ===
In the Republic of Ireland, the "National Directory Database" is an index of numbers that cannot be called for the purposes of 'cold calls' and/or sales and advertising. An unsolicited marketing call to a number on the National Directory Database is a criminal offence.

=== Japan ===
Some financial products are totally not permitted to cold-call, but the practice is generally permitted within a guideline which requires stating the name of the business, full name of the caller, name of the product and intention of solicitation. There is no do-not-call list. The Japanese government's Financial Services Agency maintains a list of known fraudulent entities involved in financial cold-calling scams.

=== European Union ===
On May 25, 2018, the European Union passed the General Data Protection Regulation which imposes obligations onto organizations anywhere, so long as they target or collect data related to people in the EU.
