= Opt-out =

Option avoid receiving unsolicited product or service information

The term opt-out refers to several methods by which individuals can avoid receiving unsolicited product or service information. This option is usually associated with direct marketing campaigns such as e-mail marketing or direct mail. A list of those who have opted out is called a Robinson list.

== Telemarketing ==
The U.S. Federal Government created the United States National Do Not Call Registry to reduce the telemarketing calls consumers receive at home. Initially numbers listed on the registry were due to be kept for five years but will now remain on it permanently due to the Do-Not-Call Improvement Act of 2007, which became law in February 2008.

The UK's Direct Marketing Association operates a voluntary opt-out scheme through the Telephone Preference Service, which was established in 1995. While the service will reduce unsolicited calls it does not stop solicited calls, market research calls, silent calls or overseas calls.

Canada's National Do Not Call List operates an opt-out list which allows consumers to register their wishes not to have telemarketing calls. Charities, newspapers, and pollsters are exempt although each of these is required to keep their own do not call list that consumers can be added to at their request.

Australia has a national Do Not Call Register. The Australian Communications and Media Authority (ACMA) is responsible for the register under the Do Not Call Register Act 2006. In order to be included on the register, a telephone number must be used or maintained primarily for private or domestic purposes, or exclusively for transmitting and/or receiving faxes. Government body numbers and emergency services numbers are also able and numbers can be removed at any time.

== E-mail marketing ==
In e-mail marketing, a clickable link or "opt-out button" may be included to notify the sender that the recipient wishes to receive no further e-mails. While 95% of all commercial e-mails from reputable bulk emailers with an unsubscribe feature indeed work in this manner, unscrupulous senders and spammers can also include a link that purports to unsubscribe a recipient; clicking the link or button confirms to the originator that the e-mail address used was a valid one, opening the door for further unsolicited e-mail.

== Online advertising ==
Targeted advertising and behavioral targeting are a series of technologies and techniques used mainly in online advertising to increase the effectiveness of advertisements. By capturing data generated by website and landing page visitors, advertisements are placed so as to reach consumers based on various traits such as demographics, psychographics, behavioral variables (such as product purchase history), and firmographic variables or other second-order activities which serve as a proxy for these traits.

=== Opt-out cookies ===
Many of the biggest third-party ad-serving companies offer opt-out cookies to users. Opt-out cookies are cookies created by ad-serving companies to enable the user to block and prevent the advertising network from installing future tracking cookies. Opt-out cookies are server specific, meaning that they only block cookies of a specific ad-serving company and won't block cookies from other companies. To do generalized blocking, the users must manage their cookies via their own browser's cookie settings.

=== Do Not Track HTTP header ===
Do Not Track (DNT) is an HTTP header field that requests that a web application or website to disable its direct or cross-site user tracking of an individual user.

The header field name is DNT and it currently accepts three values:

- 1, when the user does not want to be tracked (opt-out)
- 0, when the user consents to being tracked (opt-in)
- Null (no header), when the user does not set a preference

DNT is not widely adopted by the industry, and honoring DNT requests is not obligatory.

== Wi-Fi positioning system ==
Wi-Fi-based positioning systems take advantage of the rapid growth of wireless access points in urban areas and are used by companies like Google, Apple, and Microsoft, to obtain data about their customers' locations, in order to provide a better service. The localization technique is based on measuring the intensity of the received signal and access-point "fingerprinting". However, some users have expressed concern about their privacy being affected by this type of unsolicited positioning system, and have asked for opt-out alternatives.

Google suggested the creation of a unified approach for opting-out from taking part in Wi-Fi-based positioning systems. Suggesting the usage of the word "_nomap" (Underscore and nomap) append to a wireless access point's SSID to exclude it from Google's WPS database.

== Postal service ==
=== Credit card offers ===
Each year American consumers receive several billion written offers of credit or insurance they did not request. In many cases, the senders have prescreened the recipients for creditworthiness and suitability using consumer credit records in the files of consumer reporting agencies.

The Fair Credit Reporting Act (FCRA) permits creditors and insurers to use CRA information as a basis for sending unsolicited firm offers of credit or insurance, also known as prescreened solicitations, to consumers who meet certain criteria, but only within limits specified in the act. The FCRA also provides a mechanism by which consumers can elect not to receive such solicitations by directing CRAs to exclude their names and addresses from lists provided by these agencies for sending prescreened solicitations. Consumers who choose to have their names removed from lists used for prescreened solicitations may well still receive offers of credit or insurance by mail or telephone, but such offers will not be based on the credit records maintained by the CRAs.

People are able to opt out of receiving any offers from U.S. national credit bureaus.

=== Unsolicited direct marketing mail (a.k.a. "junk mail") ===
In the United States, the Data & Marketing Association's (DMA) Mail Preference Service provides an opt-out service. The consumer's name is added to a "delete" file which is made available to direct-mail marketers. This process does not cover opting out of Bulk Mail also known as Standard mail or Current Resident Mail, which will require opting out on a company by company basis.

There is a $2 charge to register online and there is a $3 charge to register by regular mail. There is another service to stop mail to deceased people. Registration will not stop mailings from organizations that are not registered with the DMA. DirectMail.com offers a similar service.

== Arbitration ==
Some contracts with arbitration clauses have terms that state that a party may reject the arbitration clause within a specified time frame of accepting the contract.

== See also ==
- List of marketing opt-out registries
- Privacy and Electronic Communications (EC Directive) Regulations 2003
- Unclick, computer interface design pattern
- Unified Patent Court's opt-out provisions, provisions allowing proprietors of European patents to opt out their European patents from the exclusive competence of the Unified Patent Court
- Blacklisting
