= Ghost call =

Type of telephone call

A ghost call or phantom call is a telephone call for which, the recipient of the call answers, however there is no one on the other end of the call. The term is also used in managing IP PBX systems. Ghost calls on the lines that cannot be explained or are some residual output of one Real-time Transport Protocol or RTP stream interacting with the PBX. Ghost calls differ from silent calls which tend to be from telemarking organisations with no agents available to speak at the time an automated call has been placed.

== Causes ==
Ghost calls are generally caused by a neglected autodialer or indirectly as a consequence of restrictions applied to autodialers used for telemarketing by agencies such as the FCC that restrict how long they can tie up a phone line; the call is disconnected automatically at the calling end. Another cause is port scanning. Ghost calls can also be caused by accidental pocket dialing.

== Consequences ==
A ghost call sometimes can be repetitive or completely tie up a phone line, making it impossible to call 911 in case of emergency. In some cases an auto-dialer may be overlooked or even abandoned. This tends to happen very rarely.

=== Stopping the calls ===
Several websites collect reports of ghost calls. Repeated reports of the same number provide insight into where the machine is located and hopefully aid in having it shut down.
