= Junk Fax Prevention Act of 2005 =

2005 American congressional act

- Long title: An Act to amend section 227 of the Communications Act of 1934 (47 U.S.C. 227) relating to the prohibition on junk fax transmissions.
- Enacted by: the 109th United States Congress

Citations
- Public law: Pub. L. 109–21 (text) (PDF)
- Statutes at Large: 119 Stat. 359

Codification
- Acts amended: Communications Act of 1934

Legislative history
- Introduced in the Senate as S. 714 by Gordon H. Smith on April 6, 2005; Committee consideration by Commerce, Science, and Transportation; Passed the Senate on June 24, 2005 (Unanimous consent); Passed the House on June 28, 2005 (Voice vote); Signed into law by President George W. Bush on July 9, 2005

The Junk Fax Prevention Act (JFPA) of 2005, Pub. L. 109–21 (text) (PDF), 119 Stat. 359 (2005), was passed by the United States Congress and signed into law by President George W. Bush on July 9, 2005. The law amends the Communications Act of 1934, significantly altering some aspects of prior amendments made by the Telephone Consumer Protection Act of 1991 and the CAN-SPAM Act of 2003 as they relate to the issue of junk fax.

== History of junk fax legislation ==
Congress first addressed the issue of junk faxes in the Telephone Consumer Protection Act of 1991 (TCPA). Although this legislation dealt broadly with larger issues of nuisance telemarketing tactics, it included provisions making it illegal for any person to send an unsolicited advertisement to a fax machine. The law further authorized the recipient of a fax sent in violation of the statute (or a regulation promulgated under the statute) to sue the sender in state court to enjoin further violation, recover for actual monetary losses from such a violation, $500 in statutory damages for each violation (whichever is greater), or both. The law also allows the court, in its discretion, to treble these damages if it finds the defendant violated the statute "willfully" or "knowingly."

After the bill was enacted, many companies that continued to send junk faxes were sued, often for substantial sums. The most well-known sender of junk faxes, fax.com, was repeatedly sued by government agencies and private individuals. Most notably, the company found itself faced with a $2.2 trillion suit filed by anti-junk fax crusader Steve Kirsch. The company was eventually forced out of business, though the fax.com website has since been purchased by an unrelated company. As a result, many companies moved across the border into Canada or Mexico, or set up operations overseas to continue broadcasting into the United States.

To counter this, Congress made a small but significant amendment to the statute in the CAN-SPAM Act of 2003 (Public Law No. 108-187). This amendment made it illegal for sending junk faxes from within the United States, but also if they were sent into the United States from outside the country.

The U.S. Federal Communications Commission (FCC) also promulgated regulations under the TCPA. Most of these regulations were designed to reduce the liability of senders of junk faxes. For instance, the FCC created an exemption for fax broadcasters similar to the "common carrier" exceptions created for telephone companies and an exemption for advertisements sent to recipients with whom the sender had an existing business relationship ("EBR") if the sender included a proper opt out clause. While many defendants in junk fax suits attempted to rely on these regulations, they were almost uniformly unsuccessful because courts repeatedly ruled that the FCC had been without statutory authority to create such exceptions.

The Junk Fax Prevention Act of 2005 made small but significant changes to the TCPA. Most notably, it amended the statute to legislate the EBR exemption previously promulgated by the FCC. However, the bill was not amended to authorize the FCC's so-called "common carrier" exemption.

== Effect ==
Under the Junk Fax Prevention Act of 2005, the sender of an unsolicited advertisement sent to a person's fax machine is still liable for a minimum of $500 per page, and damages may also be trebled at the court's discretion upon a finding that the violation was willful or knowing. A "willful" violation is simply one that is "volitional", while a "knowing" violation is one that occurs when the senders actually knew "or should have known" that he was potentially breaking a law, even without specific knowledge of the law.

The statute is one of strict liability; even if one sends an unsolicited advertisement by fax by accident, minimum liability of $500 per page attaches. The only real defense for the sender is that the transmission was protected by the EBR exception created by the Junk Fax Prevention Act of 2005. To qualify the sender:

1. must already have an EBR with the recipient;
2. must have received the recipient's fax number voluntarily from the recipient in the context of the EBR; and
3. A notice on the first page of the unsolicited advertisement that instructs the recipient how to request that they not receive future unsolicited facsimile advertisement. and
4. A domestic contact telephone number to opt out. and
5. A facsimile machine number to opt out. and
6. At least one cost-free mechanism for transmitting an opt-out request. and
7. It must be available 24 hours a day, 7 days a week. and
8. The notice must be clear and conspicuous and on the first page of the advertisement and
9. The notice must be distinguishable from the advertising material through, for example, use of bolding, italics, different font, or the like. and
10. It cannot be in the form of a "negative option. A facsimile advertisement containing a telephone number and an instruction to call if the recipient no longer wishes to receive such faxes, would constitute a "negative option" as the sender presumes consent unless advised otherwise. and
11. the sender must honor all opt-out requests within a reasonable period of time (not to exceed thirty days).

Failure to comply with all of these requirements leaves the sender liable for a violation of the statute, and unable to claim protection under this exception.

== Criticism ==
Advertisers and fax broadcasters welcomed the JFPA as providing a means of advertising to existing customers. They point out that before the JFPA, companies could not legally send regular customers advertisements and notices of special discounts via fax. Under the amended statute, the EBR exception allows them to do this.

On the other hand, advocates for consumers and small businesses have also been harshly critical of the JFPA. Critics point out that the bill "for the first time in history... legalized the taking of your property from you without your consent by another person or private entity." They note that, even when companies send notices that could potentially save the recipients money, the senders are still doing so with the expectation that they will make sales and they are advertising for these sales by stealing the paper, supplies, and time of the recipients. Some have gone so far as to rename the JFPA the "Junk Fax Protection Act of 2005".

Defendants in civil suits brought pursuant to this statute often argue they have the affirmative defense of the "established business relationship". Yet, as is often proven in Court, the defense fails if the Defendant did not comply with 21 FCC Rcd 3787, i.e. that a valid "Opt-out" clause was part of the offending fax. If there is no valid opt-out clause, the defendant cannot take advantage of the affirmative defense of an "established business relationship".

== See also ==
- Fax art
- Do-Not-Call Implementation Act of 2003 (Public Law No. 108-10)
- Hank Magnuski
