= Dunhill International List Company =

- Industry: Marketing
- Founded: 1937
- Founder: Herbert Odza
- Headquarters: Boca Raton, Florida
- Website: www.dunhills.com

Dunhill International List Company is a Boca Raton, Florida-based company, specializing in direct marketing lists, data file maintenance, opt-in email, telemarketing and creative services. It was developed by Herbert Odza after he purchased Dunhill Public Relations in 1937. In the late 1970s, Odza's son Robert Dunhill formally established the company under the Dunhill International List name.

Dunhill International List Company is a member of the Direct Marketing Association (United States) and was one of the pioneers in establishing the Florida Direct Marketing Association.

Family owned and operated, the company is now in its third generation of family members. Cindy Dunhill Corrie, Vice President Sales; Candy Dunhill Hachenburg, Vice President Customer Service; Andy Dunhill, Vice President; and Robert Dunhill, President, head the firm.
