= Avid Telecom =

U.S. telecommunications company

- Industry: Telecommunications
- Founded: 2000; 26 years ago
- Founder: Michael D. Lansky
- Headquarters: Tucson, Arizona, U.S.
- Products: VoIP; Phone Numbers; Data and Lists; Dialing Software and Expertise
- Owner: Michael D. Lansky
- Number of employees: 10 employees
- Parent: Michael D. Lansky, LLC
- Website: avidtelecom.net

Avid Telecom is an American telecommunications company providing VoIP services, including facilitating robocalling by telemarketers. The company was established in 2000 and is based in Arizona.

== Legal challenges ==
In 2023, it was reported that 48 U.S. states and the District of Columbia were suing Avid Telecom in relation to robocalling, with Alaska and South Dakota being the only states not participating. Named in the lawsuits are owner and CEO Michael Lansky as well as VP of Sales and Operations, Stacey Reeves.

It is alleged that Avid Telecom is selling data, phone numbers, dialing software, and advice to its customers, helping them route illegal mass robocalls across the United States. From 2018 to 2023, it is alleged that Avid Telecom sent or attempted to send 24.5 billion calls. Based on data from the National Do Not Call Registry, the complainants allege that the company transmitted more than 7.5 billion calls that were spoofed or had invalid caller ID numbers. The company has stated that it will defend itself "vigorously" against the states' allegations.

Additionally, Attorneys General are suing Avid owner Michael Lansky and his company Michael D. Lansky, LLC. Lansky was warned 329 times about spam calls by telecom industry led Traceback Group, who advises providers about illegal robocalls sent via their networks, yet Lansky continued allowing robocalls in alleged violation of TCPA

In May 2024, Avid's motion to dismiss was denied.
