= RS-366 =

Electronic communication standard

A DB-25 connector, used in the RS-366 standard.

In telecommunications, RS-366, later known as EIA-366, defines a standard for serial communications between computers and an auto dialer, which is used to dial telephones. It was intended to be used to automate the operation of modems. The standard uses the same DB25 connectors and electrical signalling standards of the well-known RS-232 standard, which RS-366 was designed to support. The CCITT had a matching standard, V.25.

The earliest modems were used in the SAGE system that automated the collection of radar data, digitized it, and sent it over modems on leased lines to the SAGE computers. Modems were soon being used in business roles, notably in the SABRE that was patterned on the SAGE system. In these roles, the connections were always to the same remote machine, so there was no need to dial the phone, only connect and disconnect.

There were some business cases for automated dialling, but these tended to be mission specific. One common example was for a bank's central computer to call out to branches to retrieve transactions, thus centralizing the phone costs at the computer site rather than each branch. As these were highly customized applications, this lent itself to the development of a variety of incompatible systems. RS-366 was an effort to standardize the communications with these dialler systems.

RS-366, unlike RS-232, was a partially parallel communication system. Although most of the standard used RS-232 serial-like signalling, the digits of the phone number were sent as a 4-bit binary number in parallel on pins 14 through 17, with 14 being the least significant digit. So to send the digit 9, pins 14 (1) and 17 (8) would be put to the "mark" state, whereas the digit 6 would mark pins 15 and 16.

With each digit, the host system data terminal equipment (DTE, typically a computer) would raise pin 2 to indicate the digit was ready for the dialler to read. When the dialler completed the read, it would raise pin 5 to indicate it was ready for another. The "digit" 10 represented a wait-for-dialtone, while 11 indicated the end of the number. Once the entire dialling string had been read to the dialler, the DTE would start dialling by raising pin 4.

While the RS-366 standard process was progressing, the Hayes Smartmodem was introduced. This combined the modem and autodialler in a single box and communicated with both using a single RS-232 cable. This eliminated the cost and complexity of needing two ports and devices. The need for RS-366 disappeared, but the standards process continued for a time and at least some products were introduced based on it. The standard was obsolete by the time the Telecommunications Industry Association took over the EIA efforts, and it was never referred to as TIA-366.

== Pinouts ==
Circuit			Direction		DB-25 pin
Name	Typical purpose	Abbreviation	DTE	DCE	DB-25 pin
Protective Ground (Shield)	Connected to chassis ground.	PG	common		1
Digit Present	Indicates a digit of the phone number is ready to be read.	DPR	out	in	2
Abandon Call & Retry	Hangs up and redials the number.	ACR	out	in	3
Call Request	Indicates the call should be placed.	CRQ	out	in	4
Present Next Digit	The dialer has read the current digit and is ready for another.	PND	in	out	5
Power Indication	The dialer is powered up.	PWI	in	out	6
Signal Ground	Ground reference for all signal pins.		common		7
Distant Station Connection	Indicates that the remote system has answered the phone.	DSC	in	out	13
Digit Signal Circuit 1	Bit one of the 4-bit digit.	NB1	out	in	14
Digit Signal Circuit 2	Bit two.	NB2	out	in	15
Digit Signal Circuit 4	Bit three.	NB4	out	in	16
Digit Signal Circuit 8	Bit four.	NB8	out	in	17
Receive Common		RC	out	in	18
Send Common		SC	out	in	19
Data Link Occupied	Indicates the data line (modem) is already connected.	DLO	out	in	22
