= Trigger list =

Trigger list in its most general meaning refers to a list whose items are used to initiate ("trigger") certain actions.

== United States: Private financial information ==
In the United States, when a person applies for a mortgage loan, the lender makes a credit inquiry about the potential borrower from the national credit bureaus, Equifax, Experian and TransUnion. Unless the borrower is opted out, the credit bureaus put the applicants onto a "trigger list" of "leads" about persons who are interested in new loans. These lists are sold to numerous lenders all over the United States, and soon after the application the applicant starts receiving offers from all parts of the country. The trigger lists contain a significant amount of personal financial information. Among the buyers of trigger lists are "lead generators" which resell filtered information to borrowers, e.g., of people who live in a certain area and have a certain credit score.

While the Federal Trade Commission considers the market of "trigger lists" to be a legal business, many people and organizations (such as the National Association of Mortgage Brokers) consider this a serious breach of privacy and lobby for putting this practice under regulatory controls.

As of now, American consumers may opt-out from "trigger lists" by calling 1-888-5-OPTOUT (1-888-567-8688).

== Nuclear non-proliferation ==
The Zangger Committee and the Nuclear Suppliers Group maintain lists of items that may contribute to nuclear proliferation; The nuclear non-proliferation treaty forbids its members to export such items to non-treaty members. these items are said to trigger the countries' responsibilities under the NPT, hence the name.

== See also ==
- Optoutprescreen.com
- Sucker list
