= PCCI Group =

PCCI GROUP
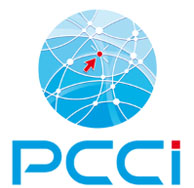
- Company type: Company held as a part of Teyliom Global Capital
- Industry: Call centers; Customer Assistance
- Founded: 2002
- Headquarters: Dubai, United Arab Emirates
- Number of locations: 12
- Key people: Abdoulaye Sarre; Abdoulaye Mboup; Yérim Habib Sow; Nidal Kamouni
- Products: Customer Management; Technical support; Telemarketing; Call-centre
- Number of employees: 5,000
- Website: pcci-group.com

PCCI Group is a multinational business process outsourcing (BPO) company providing a call-center service for businesses operating within these areas:

- Travel and Hospitality
- Telecommunications
- Media and Entertainment
- Banks, Fintech and Insurance
- E-commerce
- Healthcare
- BPO and Government agencies
- Technology
- Utilities
- Retail.

In 2022 the company owned and operated 12 "contact centers" distributed through 8 African countries.

While operations are based in Africa, the company has contracts being outsourced from Europe and the Middle East.

== History and company growth ==
Founded in 2002, the company started off with a single call center out of Senegal only functioning with a maximum capacity of 300 employees/'callers'. PCCI Group is furthermore in partnership with its parent company: the Teyliom Group. With Teyliom Group offering services generally considered to be part of Telecommunications services, the partnership was struck up quite naturally due to the two companies complementing each other's functions. PCCI started its operations with Orange in France by offering services in the field of customer acquisition and commercial telemarketing and continued growing to offer national and international, multichannel services. The company is continuing to establish itself in the call-center and telecommunications market, often being recognized for its consistent and branded customer service. Since opening its doors in 2002, the group has constantly continued to expand its activities with the opening of various subsidiaries in a variety of African countries through the years; an example of this is the opening of its subsidiary in Côte d'Ivoire in 2010 after having partnered up with MTN Côte d'Ivoire in 2007.

== Clients ==
PCCI Group delivers its services primarily in English and France and holds multiple Fortune 500 companies as clients; this includes European, Middle East and African leaders in telecommunications, media, BFSI, energy, retail and tourism.

== Locations ==
PCCI headquarters are located in Dubai (UAE) with operations in Paris (France), London (United Kingdom) and in emerging markets. Beyond its HQ the company holds active 12 active call-centers distributed through 8 African countries.
