= Natural predictive dialing =

Natural predictive dialing is a technology, developed to eliminate problems typically associated with predictive dialing. These issues include abandoned calls, initial call delays, government regular, and consumer dissatisfaction, among others.

At its core, natural predictive dialing technologies are based on the concept that call automation should work with agents, instead of call automation working before agents are connected.

In natural predictive dialing, the call automation (sometimes called Call Progress Analysis (CPA)) can work before, during, or after a caller has interfered with a call. This interweaving of automation and human agents provides productivity increase and works to eliminate the unnatural effect that many call automation technologies have on the human interaction aspects of the call.

== Benefits ==
In natural predictive dialing, the agents hear the called party say "hello" and can respond accordingly. The technology is deployed on small and large scales (one user up to thousands). Contact centers aiming for a natural calling experience and increased productivity might use this technology.

== Drawbacks ==
The only commercially available natural predictive dialer is provided by a single vendor. Additionally, patents protecting the technology make it more expensive than many other systems, such as those available for free based on the Asterisk platform.

== See also ==
- Predictive dialer
- Dialer
- Auto dialer
