= Direct Marketing Association (South Africa) =

The Direct Marketing Association of South Africa (DMASA) is a Section 21 Company and self-regulatory organization empowered by law to ensure that direct marketers adhere to a strict code of practice, and to protect the rights of consumers when buying from direct marketing organisations.

The DMA's website carries a national opt-out database where, once registered, users will not be contacted by any member companies of the DMA. However, accessing this database requires you to submit your ID, phone number, and email address. This information would typically be kept confidential from direct marketers. And exposing it like this to the internet makes consumers solely dependent on the security measures they, the DMA, have implemented for its protection.

All that is required in other countries registries is to register from the device, with the required phone number, to be added to the register. This system would preclude the privacy concerns, and remove such, as a barrier for use of the DMA register.

== See also ==
- Direct marketing associations
