= Teleblock =

Software program

TeleBlock is a software program that automatically screens and blocks outbound calls against available federal, state, wireless, third party, and in-house Do-Not-Call (DNC) lists. Designed for use in telemarketing and outbound call centers, TeleBlock is applied to a subscriber's telephone carrier, provided voice lines, or delivered through their predictive dialing and Customer Relationship Management (CRM) software. The system triggers all predetermined outbound calls to query a proprietary customer specific DNC database in real-time.

== History ==
On November 9, 1999, Alison (Garfinkel) Andrews, president and inventor of Call Compliance, and Dean Garfinkel, CEO of Call Compliance, Inc., filed a patent for a "call blocking system". The patent describes a call blocking system as:

The integration of various federally required and state mandated do-not-call lists for telemarketers into a system that automatically blocks outgoing calls from a number of companies ("Customer Companies") taking into account factors such as preexisting customers which may legally be contacted is disclosed. The system reviews outgoing calls by a telemarketer, compares it to the general do-not-call lists and the specific customer company do-not-call list and override permitted call list to make a determination if the call should be completed. This integration is due to the incorporation of a general purpose computer in a central location that is connected to all the major telephone carriers switch cluster locations and operated by a service provider. The "do-not-call" database of originating/destination pairs, as well as the logic for blocking or permitting telephone calls, is stored in this computer. This computer makes all blocking decisions in real-time based on the originating and destination number combinations of the call.

The patent was issued on December 11, 2001.

In 2010, Teleblock was acquired by Gryphon Networks.

== Government testimony ==
In a statement to the United States Federal Communications Commission (FCC) regarding Do Not Call regulations in the US, Steve Carter, Attorney General of Indiana, commented on the effectiveness of TeleBlock. In his comments, Carter stated that TeleBlock has "supplied a cost-effective, straightforward tool for telemarketers to comply with the Commission's Rules, the Federal Trade Commission's Rules, and the various state rules governing telephone solicitations." Carter went on to say, "TeleBlock has yet to see one of its customers fined."

== State DNC rules ==
Some companies, such as Call Compliance, Inc., offer a list of all state DNC regulations in one area.

== International ==
In September 2008, Canada opened registration to the Canadian DNC list to the general public. Three Canadian service providers – VanillaSoft, Thunder CRM, and MarkeTel – offered TeleBlock in Canada at that time.
