= List of Old Boys of St Patrick's College, Strathfield =

This is a list of notable Old Boys of St Patrick's College, Strathfield, they being notable former students of the independent Roman Catholic school, St Patrick's College, located in Strathfield, an Inner West suburb of Sydney, New South Wales, Australia.

== Academia, science and medicine ==
- John Michael Dwyer AO, Australian doctor, professor of medicine, and public health advocate. Former Head of the Department of Clinical Immunology at Yale University
- John Stanley Mattick AO, FAA, geneticist and microbiologist, former director of the Garvan Institute of Medical Research, inaugural chief executive officer at Genomics England
- Peter McDonald, Australian demographer
- Michael K. Morgan AM, professor of Neurosurgery and Dean of Medicine, School of Advanced Medicine, Macquarie University
- Chris Tinney, professor and Associate Dean for the Faculty of Science at UNSW, where he heads the Exoplanetary Science at UNSW group within the School of Physics. Former head of the Australian Astronomical Observatory

== Bureaucracy, politics and the law ==
- John Brogden AM – former NSW Liberal Leader of the Opposition and former Member for Pittwater. Current Chairman of Lifeline and Patron of Kookaburra Kids.
- John J. Brown AO – Minister for Sport, Recreation and Tourism in the First Hawke Ministry 1983–1988. Minister for Administrative Services until 1984 and Minister assisting the Minister for Defence
- Tony Burke MP – Federal Labor Member for Watson, Leader of the House, Minister for Employment and Workplace Relations, Minister for the Arts and Manager of Business and former member of the NSW Legislative Council
- Ralph James "Mick" Clough – Labor Member of the New South Wales Legislative Assembly from 1976 to 1981, representing the electorate of Blue Mountains and representing the electorate of Bathurst from 1981 to 1988 and again from 1991 to 1999
- Bryan Doyle MP – former NSW Liberal member for Campbelltown
- Craig Emerson – former Federal Labor Member for Rankin and minister
- Laurie Ferguson MP – former Federal Labor Member for Werriwa, former NSW Member for Granville and brother of Martin
- Martin Ferguson AM – former Federal Member for Batman and minister and brother of Laurie
- Justin Gleeson SC – former Solicitor-General of Australia (2013–2016), the Commonwealth's second-ranking law officer.
- Dick Healey – former NSW Liberal Member for Davidson and Minister
- Gary Humphries – former Liberal chief minister of the ACT and former senator for the ACT
- Craig Laundy MP – Former Federal Liberal Member for Reid and former Minister for Small and Family Business, the Workplace and Deregulation, former Assistant Minister for Industry, Innovation and Science, former Assistant Minister for Multicultural Affairs
- Paul Lynch MP – NSW Labor Member for Liverpool and Shadow Attorney General
- Dennis Mahoney AO KC KSG - Former President of the NSW Court of Appeal, former President of the International Commission of Jurists (ICJ), and namesake of the internationally coveted Dennis Leslie Mahoney Prize in Legal Theory
- Paul McLeay – former NSW Labor Member for Heathcote and Minister
- Eddie Obeid - former Member of the New South Wales Legislative Council and Minister
- John Pierce – former Secretary of the Department and Chief Economist to The Treasury (New South Wales), former secretary of the department to the Australian Government Department of Resources Energy & Tourism and current chairman of the Australian Energy Market Commission
- Tony Pooley - Australian public servant and the last mayor of South Sydney
- Kieran Prendergast KCVO, CMG – former British diplomat (High Commissioner to Zimbabwe, Kenya, Ambassador to Turkey) and UN Under-Secretary-General 1997–2005
- Douglas W. Sutherland AM – 78th Lord Mayor of Sydney

== Business ==
- Greg Coffey, London hedge fund manager
- Peter Mattick AM, co-founder and former interim chief executive officer of Salmat
- Phil Salter, co-founder of Salmat
- John Symond AM, financial executive and founder of Aussie Home Loans

== Clergy ==
- Most Reverend Bede Vincent Heather – Bishop Emeritus of Parramatta; former co-chairman of the Catholic/Baptist International Dialogue and first Bishop of Parramatta 1986–1997.
- Most Reverend Patrick Murphy – former vice-president and rector of the Post Graduate House at St Patrick's Seminary, former president of St Patrick's Seminary, former episcopal vicar for education, former chairman of the Sydney Archdiocesan Catholic Schools Board and former chairman of the Catholic Education Commission of NSW; and the inaugural bishop of Broken Bay 1986–1996

== Entertainment, media and the arts ==
- Mig Ayesa, actor, notable work includes "Joe" the landlord on ABC children's serial The Ferals
- Thomas Keneally AO, author and Australian National Living Treasure
- Rob Shehadie, film and television actor whose notable works include the television show Pizza, Here Come the Habibs, Street Smart and Housos
- Peter Skrzynecki, poet, writer and lecturer at the University of Western Sydney

== Sport ==
- John Ballesty – former Australian Rugby Union International
- Julian Carroll - former Olympic Swimmer
- Tim Pickup – former Australian Rugby League International. Named in North Sydney Bears Team of the Century in 2006, nominated for Canterbury-Bankstown Bulldogs, 70 years Team of Champions in 2004. Nominated for Manly Rugby Union Team of the Century in 2006.
- Adam Doueihi – Australian rugby league footballer for the South Sydney Rabbitohs and Wests Tigers, and representative for Lebanon in the 2017 Rugby League World Cup
- Michael Foley – Australian rugby union player, Australian rugby union forwards coach 2003–2008, New South Wales Warartahs rugby union coach 2008. Until 2016 coach of the Western Force
- Ben Manenti - professional cricketer who has played for Tasmania, South Australia, the Sydney Sixers, and the Adelaide Strikers. He has also represented the Italy national cricket team
- Harry Manenti - professional cricketer who plays for Adelaide Strikers and the Italy national cricket team
- John Manenti - former Australian rugby union coach responsible for two World Rugby Sevens Series wins. Current coach of the San Diego Legion MLR team
- Brian McCowage – Australian Foil Champion. Olympic Representative at the 1956, 1960 and 1964 Olympic Games
- Don McDeed - former Australian Rugby Union International
- Mark Nawaqanitawase – NRL professional football player for the Sydney Roosters and NSW Blues. Australian rugby union international. Olympic Representative for Australia in Rugby Sevens at Paris 2024.
- Rob Shehadie – a film and television actor who also represented Lebanon as a professional, international, rugby league player
- Chris Siale - professional rugby union player
- Matt Williams – professional rugby coach and sports commentator

== See also ==
- List of Catholic schools in New South Wales
- Catholic education in Australia
