= Robocall =

Phone call delivering pre-recorded message

A robocall is a phone call that uses a computerized autodialer to deliver a pre-recorded message, as if from a robot. Robocalls are often associated with political and telemarketing phone campaigns, but can also be used for public service, emergency announcements, or scammers. Multiple businesses and telemarketing companies use auto-dialing software to deliver prerecorded messages (appointment reminders, booking details, etc.) to millions of users. Some robocalls use personalized audio messages to simulate an actual personal phone call. The service is also viewed as prone to association with scams.

As of June 2019, phone companies may, by default, block incoming robocalls. Many signed calls still reach end users, just flagged, not blocked; gateway carrier enforcement exists, but scammers rotate upstream providers faster than FCC actions land; VoIP providers historically had easy access to numbering, enabling large-scale abuse before recent tightening; carriers have been reluctant to block aggressively due to litigation risk, political backlash, and liability concerns; large robocall campaigns can scale nationally before meaningful enforcement kicks in; and the US sustains a large domestic robocall and lead-generation industry that keeps call volume structurally high.

== History ==
=== First description ===
Automated phone solicitation, i.e. robocalling, was one of the earliest applications proposed for the first microcomputers. The first documented mention of it was in the "Memo from the Publisher" by David Bunnell in Personal Computing magazine, May/June 1977. Under the heading "Personal Computing Abused", Bunnell described a presentation at the World Altair Computer Convention in March 1976 of "an intriguing business application for personal computing". The computer would sequentially dial phone numbers, play a taped voice message, and then use speech recognition to respond with additional messages as appropriate. In his "Memo from the Publisher", David Bunnell reported that "the proposal was not very well received" at the conference. It was criticized as "insensitive to the rights of personal privacy" and "could cause a public uproar".

== North America ==
=== Canada ===
Robocalls can be and are legitimately used by mainstream political parties in Canada to reach voters. Controversy surrounded the use of robocalls during the 2011 Canadian federal election, leading Elections Canada and the Royal Canadian Mounted Police to investigate claims that robocalls were used in an attempt to dissuade voters from casting their ballot by falsely telling them their poll stations had changed locations. Elections Canada traced the origin of the automated calls to a disposable cellphone registered to a fictional name "Pierre Poutine" at a phony address from 450 area code of Joliette, Quebec, and issued a subpoena to the cellphone provider that produced a list of outgoing calls from the same number. One of the calls was to the toll-free number used by customers of 2call.ca, a subsidiary of Edmonton-based Internet service provider RackNine, to phone in and record their outgoing messages. The burner cell phone belonging to "Pierre Poutine" was used to contact the owner of Racknine at his personal unlisted number and gave the name "Pierre Jones". This burner phone initiated a series of automated robocalls mostly in Guelph but with a few dozen in other ridings, that targeted mostly non-Conservative voters with false voting location changes. Some voters attended what they had been led to believe were their voting locations, and sometimes destroyed their voter registration cards in anger.

In November 2011, the investigator served RackNine with a production order for records and had the account holder associated with the bogus calls quickly identified. Investigators have also examined the Conservative Party's CIMS voter database and showed that "Pierre Poutine" used the Conservative voter database to select whom to call. Investigators have blank entries for one specific login, leading to speculation that evidence has been deleted. PayPal has also surrendered their records to investigators since "Pierre Poutine" has used a PayPal account to pay for the bill for the automated calls. The cost for these May 2, 2011, calls was $162.10, Elections Canada said in court filings. This expenditure was never reported to Elections Canada, as required for legitimate political spending.

Prime Minister Stephen Harper and the Conservative Party of Canada have denied any knowledge or involvement. A Conservative party staffer resigned soon after the scandal was reported but has since come forward stating that he was not involved. Elections Canada has made a statement and reported to Parliament, that the fraud was extensive, affecting 200 ridings in all ten provinces plus Yukon Territory. The Council of Canadians, a left of centre activist group, has asserted that the robocalls may have been enough to swing the result by 4%, enough to win a number of ridings in very close races. A court challenge has been initiated by this group to overturn the results of the election in seven ridings, and initiate by-elections for the respective seven House of Commons seats.

After reviewing the investigation of the "Pierre Poutine" scandal in 2013, Federal Court Judge Richard Mosley found that election fraud had taken place in six ridings across the country but found no evidence that the Conservative party or candidates were involved. He also did not find sufficient evidence to support charges in ridings other than Guelph. As well, he indicated that the "robocalls" had not affected the outcome of the 2011 election in any riding.

After a lengthy investigation of the circumstances of the scandal, Michael Sona, the former director of communications for the Conservative candidate in the Guelph (Ontario) riding was charged on June 2, 2014 with "wilfully preventing or endeavouring to prevent an elector from voting". Sona was found guilty on November 14, 2014 and was sentenced to nine months in jail plus twelve months of probation. Sona was released from jail on bail after serving twelve days, pending his appeal of the sentence. However, Sona did not appeal the conviction. During the trial, Justice Hearn agreed with the Crown allegation that Sona had likely not acted alone.

=== United States ===
The federal Telephone Consumer Protection Act of 1991 (TCPA) regulates automated calls. Pre-recorded robocalls must identify who is initiating the call and include a telephone number or address whereby the initiator can be reached. In 2019, the United States Congress passed legislation expanding the regulation of robocalls. That same year there was an interim ruling that seemed to weaken restrictions on autodialers.

==== Debt collection ====
In 2015, government debt collection was exempted from the 1991 robocall restrictions; however, the Supreme Court invalidated this exception on July 6, 2020, in Barr v. American Assn. of Political Consultants, Inc. (19-631). The court decided that it was a First Amendment violation to favor "debt-collection speech over political and other speech."

==== Political calls ====
Robocalls are made by many political parties in the United States, including but not limited to both the Republican and Democratic parties as well as unaffiliated campaigns, 527 organizations, unions, and individual citizens. Political robocalls are exempt from the United States National Do Not Call Registry. The Telephone Consumer Protection Act of 1991 (TCPA) and Federal Communications Commission (FCC) regulations prohibit anyone (including charities, politicians and political parties) from making robocalls to cell phone numbers without the recipients' prior consent. The FCC permits non-commercial robocalls to most residential (non-cellular) telephone lines.

Some states (23 according to DMNews) have laws that regulate or prohibit political robocalls. Indiana and North Dakota prohibit automated political calls. In New Hampshire, political robocalls are allowed, except when the recipient is in the National Do Not Call Registry. Many states require the disclosure of who paid for the call, often requiring such notice be recorded in the candidate's own voice. The patch-work of state laws regulating political robocalls has created problems for national campaigns.

Before the 2024 New Hampshire primary, robocalls featuring an AI-generated voice of President Joe Biden urged Democrats in the state to "save" their votes for November. On February 8, 2024, the FCC voted unanimously for a declaratory ruling that makes the use of AI-generated voices in robocalls illegal under the Telephone Consumer Protection Act. The ruling gave state attorneys general more authority to act against those using voice cloning in robocall scams. Political consultant Steve Kramer, who admitted orchestrating the calls, was acquitted by a New Hampshire jury of all state charges of voter suppression and impersonating a candidate. He still faces a $6 million fine from the Federal Communications Commission.

==== California ====
The first political robo calls were launched in January 1983 when business owner Tony Inocentes used his telemarketing machine from his collection agency business to announce his candidacy for the 57th Assembly District in California. He launched over 300,000 automated calls before losing the November 1983 General election to the incumbent Dave Elder. Inocentes founded the GOTV election company ePolitical USA in 1984.

In 2001 Inocentes invented political robo polling launching the first political robo poll on October 31, 2001, in the Lynwood, CA city council elections.

California prohibits any robocall unless there is an existing relationship. The California Public Utilities Code §§ 2871 et seq. holds political campaigns to the same rules as other organizations making calls with an automatic dialing–announcing device. The guidelines are:

- A person must come on the line before the recording to identify the nature of the call and the organization behind it.
- The recipient of the call must consent to the recording being played.
- The call must be disconnected from the telephone line as soon as the message is over or the recipient hangs up, whichever comes first.

==== Indiana ====
Indiana requires introduction of any prerecorded message by a live operator; the message may only be played if the called party grants permission.

==== Missouri ====
In September 2008, then-Missouri Attorney General Jay Nixon alerted political campaigns in Missouri that his office would aggressively enforce federal rules (Telephone Consumer Protection Act of 1991) requiring calls to include identifying and contact information.

==== North Carolina ====
Robocalls were made during the 2008 North Carolina Democratic primary, targeting African-American voters in the days leading up to the primary in late April 2008, which essentially told registered voters that they were not registered. According to NPR and Facing South, these calls were made by the organization "Women's Voices Women Vote". Voters and watchdog groups complained that it was a turnout-suppression effort, and the state Attorney General Roy Cooper ordered them to stop making the calls. The group stopped the calls and no further legal action was taken.

==== South Carolina ====
South Carolina had a law prohibiting most types of unsolicited consumer and political robocalls, but in 2010, campaign consultant Robert Cahaly was arrested by the South Carolina State Law Enforcement Division, being charged for making illegal robocalls to six state house districts. The automated opinion polling system asked whether U.S. Speaker Nancy Pelosi should be invited to campaign with six Democratic candidates for the South Carolina Legislature. Cahaly was arrested despite having a written opinion from the state attorney general stating that he had acted within the law. The charges were subsequently dismissed in October 2012. After the charges were dropped, Cahaly filed a suit against state officials, claiming his constitutional right to free speech had been violated. U.S. district court judge, Michelle Childs ruled that South Carolina's anti-robocall statute was a content-based restriction on speech and therefore unconstitutional.

==== Proposed additional regulations ====
California Senator Dianne Feinstein (D-CA) introduced the Federal Robocall Privacy Act in February 2008 at a Senate Committee on Rules and Administration hearing. The Act proposed to: 1) limit robocalls to no more than two a day by any one candidate, 2) mandate that candidates have accurate caller ID numbers displayed, 3) mandate that the disclosure of who is paying for the call occur at the start of the call, rather than at the end of the call, and 4) mandate that the time of the call occur not before 8 a.m. or after 9 p.m. The bill was read twice, and since it received no further action during the session, it did not become law. Similar bills have been submitted in subsequent years without success.

Shaun Dakin, CEO of Citizens for Civil Discourse, testified at the hearing and described how robocalls affect the lives of voters across the nation. He also wrote an op-ed for the Washington Post calling for a Voter Privacy Bill of Rights in which all voters would have the right to opt out of political robocalls if they did not wish to receive them.

Dakin, a former John Kerry campaign worker, set up a website called Stoppoliticalcalls.org and claimed to allow citizens to opt out of receiving robocalls. However, there is no guarantee that the registry will stop the calls and since there is no law that supports the database it is essentially an Internet petition. As mentioned above, the Robocall Privacy Act failed to become law and neither bill had provisions for a do-not-call registry for stopping robocalls.

Despite heavy media publicity of the database, only seven politicians in the United States voluntarily pledged to respect the list during the 2008 general election cycle. Of those seven, only three made it to the general election and only Virginia Foxx (R) was reelected in November 2008.

On September 1, 2009, a new regulation of the Federal Trade Commission went into effect, banning most robocalls without written opt-in from the receiver. Political campaigns, surveys, charities, debt collectors, and health care providers are exempt, as are calls to businesses. Calls from banks, insurers, and phone companies are out of the jurisdiction of the FTC. In situations under federal jurisdiction, the federal law will supersede a slightly less restrictive law in the state of California.

== Reverse robocalling ==
In June 2019 the telephony-based scambaiting community launched BobRTC.TEL, a telephone directory that tracks verified inbound telephone numbers that reach contact centers operated by known robocallers and telephone scams. The service also allows logged-in users to place calls directly to scammers using the service's own telephone numbers as the Caller ID which avoids the user placing a call with their own handset, which allows callers to scam bait robocallers.

== Auto warranty robocalls ==
Auto warranty robocalls are a series of scam robocalls in North America originating from the Sumco Panama company. The call typically begins "We're trying to reach you about your extended warranty"; it is a phishing scam intended to trick the caller into calling the provided number and then submit their credit card details to extend a non-existent warranty.

Over 58 billion of these fraudulent robocalls have been made since 2021. Beginning in July 2022, the Federal Communications Commission ordered telecom providers to cease carrying calls from the Sumco Panama Company.

== Suppressing unwanted and illegal robocalls ==
Many robocalls are not wanted, and several methods have been developed to prevent unwanted robocalls. Many countries operate do not call lists, but the lists have been ineffective and legally problematic in some cases. Consequently, a market has developed for products that allow consumers to block robocalls. Most products use methods similar to those used to mitigate SPIT (spam over Internet telephony) and can be broadly categorised by the primary method used. However, due to the complexity of the problem, no single method is sufficiently reliable. A combination of methods can be used together to provide more effective results, provided care is taken to ensure that the combination of techniques would not degrade the user experience.

Solutions are available as both hardware and software products. Mobile apps are especially prevalent as they use techniques which do not require the modification of infrastructure. Many products are limited to use only on a single medium, such as traditional copper landlines, or mobile phone contracts from a specific mobile phone operator.

=== Blacklisting and whitelisting ===
In its simplest form, this method offers the ability to prevent further calls from phone numbers, once they are known to be a source of robocalls. Many mobile apps can prevent robocalls with a user generated blacklist.

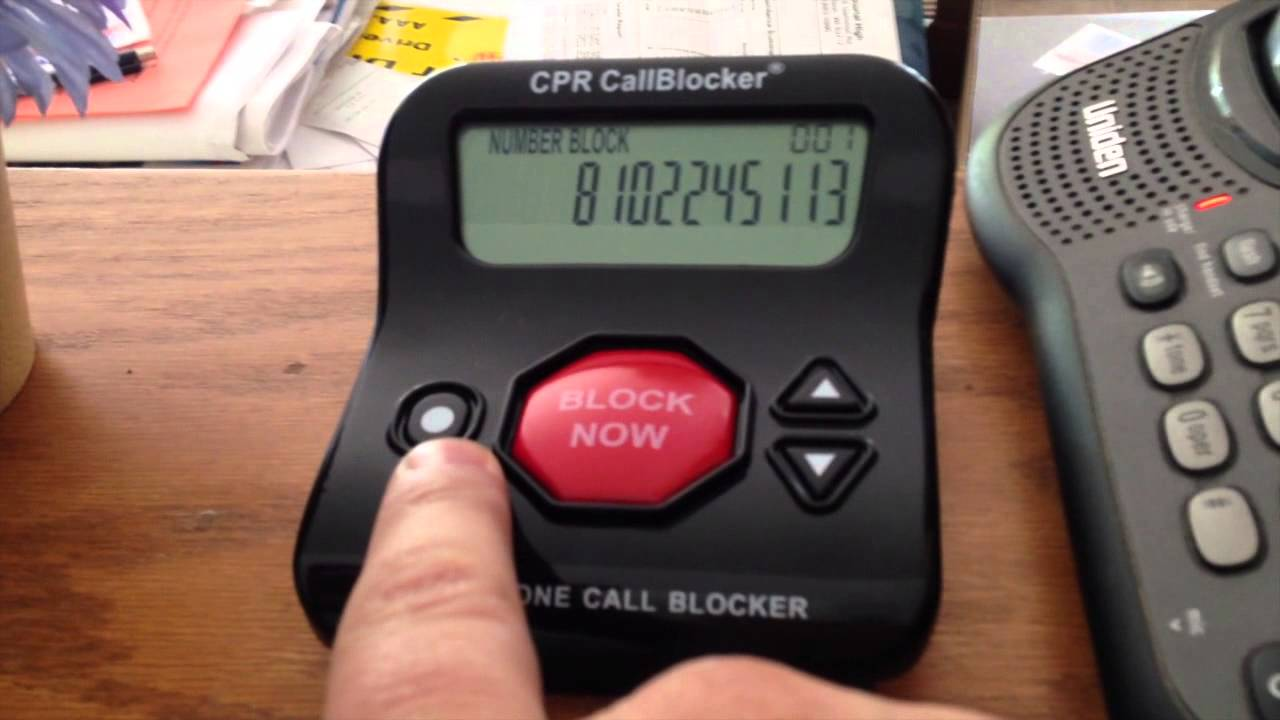
Landline call blocker in use

For landlines there are standalone call blockers which connect to the telephone. Various models work on blacklisting and whitelisting principles. Call blockers received attention from publications including Which? and Consumer Reports in the United Kingdom and United States respectively.

In the UK BT operates a service for landlines called Choose to Refuse which allows customers to block up to 10 phone numbers of their choice for a monthly fee.

A number of physical products have been developed for use with landlines. These are typically installed in homes and employ a hard coded or irregularly updated blacklist. Some models also have the function to create a user-generated whitelist. Newer devices for landlines can use cloud based data to resolve the hard coded blacklist issues and allow the creation of a personal whitelist/blacklist.

=== Crowdsourcing ===
A more sophisticated model uses crowdsourcing to build a more comprehensive blacklist of robocall numbers. A notable example of this is the app Truecaller, which requires users to provide access to their personal whitelist of genuine contacts in exchange for access to the larger crowdsourced database. In 2013, hackers gained access to Truecaller's database of known genuine numbers, highlighting the danger of centralising this information.

=== CAPTCHA ===
Building on the crowdsourcing model, Primus Canada launched a patented product called Telemarketing Guard for landlines in 2007. It improves on previous models by including a CAPTCHA style challenge-response test.

Based on a database developed from customer feedback, it filters suspected telemarketing calls to a system which challenges callers to record their name after pressing a button. If a name is recorded, the customer's phone rings with the Caller ID of Telemarketing Guard. If they answer the phone, they are played the recording, at which point they can accept the call or decline and report it.

=== Realtime analysis ===
A major problem for the use of both blacklisting and whitelisting techniques is the practice of caller ID spoofing, which is prevalent as a result of the low barrier to entry in the VoIP services market.

In 2015 the Federal Communications Commission proposed a framework for the telecommunications industry in the United States, which included a validation system at network level for robocalls from SIP sources by 2017. The final authentication task in the framework is the signing of all VoIP calls, which would allow carriers to reliably identify robocalls.

Until these goals are achieved, a more advanced method for blocking robocalls uses real-time business intelligence techniques to address the constantly changing identities of robocalls. With access to a large enough data sample, it is possible to create algorithms which detect call patterns without requiring reporting by users.

In 2016, both Verizon and Sprint each launched their own service based on Enhanced Caller ID, which is developed by Cequint and incorporates whitelisting, blacklisting and crowdsourcing techniques. For improved accuracy, it is complemented by a technology called Call Guardian developed by TNS, which performs caller behavior analysis on the 25 billion public calls they handle every year in real time.

=== Call Authentication ===
To resolve the spoofing problem that made call blocking based on caller reputation problematic, starting in mid-2017, and with intended culmination in 2019, the FCC pushed forward Caller ID certification implemented via a methodology called SHAKEN/STIR.(SHKEN/STIR (Secure Telephone Identity Revisited and Signature-Based Handling of Asserted Information Using Tokens) In June 2019, the FCC adopted a rule allowing (but not mandating) phone companies to block unwanted robocalls by default, without a consumer opt-in; a rule related to source authentication was still in a public comment period.

The TRACED Act, signed into law in December 2019, requires the FCC to implement Caller ID authentication, requires the FCC to report all criminal robocalls to the Justice Department, gives consumers access to robocall blocking at no charge, and increases penalties for violators.

The Texas-based voice service provider Lingo Telecom, which transmitted AI-generated robocalls imitating President Joe Biden to New Hampshire voters before the state's 2024 Democratic primary, agreed to pay a $1 million fine in a settlement with the FCC. The FCC had cited the company's failure to properly implement STIR/SHAKEN. The calls had been signed with "A-level" attestations, which indicate that the signing provider has a direct relationship with the caller and that the caller is entitled to use the number shown on caller ID.

== Enforcement ==
The goal is to deal with the million plus complaints per year, with only about 20% involving a live caller.

In August 2016, a "Robocall Strike Force" of thirty companies said they would help crack down on the problem.

Enforcement and fines in the United States is not a deterrence to robocallers because the United States government rarely collects any of the fines imposed by the Federal Communications Commission ("FCC"). The FCC lacks authority to collect the fines and forfeitures, the robocallers do not voluntarily pay the fine, and the US Department of Justice does not take action to collect the fine.

=== Federal Communications Commission Orders and Declaratory Rulings ===
==== 2009 ====
In May 2009, in response to numerous complaints, the Federal Trade Commission asked a federal court to shut down a telemarketing campaign that has been bombarding U.S. consumers with hundreds of millions of allegedly deceptive robocalls in an effort to sell them vehicle service contracts under the guise that they are extensions of original vehicle warranties. The FTC took action against both the promoter of the phony extended auto warranties, as well as the telemarketing company that it hired to carry out its illegal, deceptive campaign. The FTC contends that the companies are operating a massive telemarketing scheme that uses random, pre-recorded phone calls to deceive consumers into thinking that their vehicle's warranty is about to expire. Consumers who respond to the robocalls are pressured to purchase extended service contracts for their vehicles, which the telemarketers falsely portray as an extension of the manufacturer's original warranty. According to papers the FTC filed with the court, however, the robocalls have prompted tens of thousands of complaints from consumers who are either on the United States National Do Not Call Registry or asked not to be called. Five telephone numbers associated with the defendants have generated a total of 30,000 Do Not Call complaints. Consumers received the robocalls at home, work, and on their cell phones, sometimes several times in one day. Businesses, government offices and even 911 dispatchers have been subjected to the calls.

Those who answer the pre-recorded calls hear a message telling them that their vehicle warranty is about to expire and that they should "extend coverage before it is too late". They are told to "press one" to speak to a "warranty specialist". The "specialists" then mislead consumers into believing that their company is affiliated with the dealer or manufacturer of the consumer's vehicle. They try to sell consumers a service contract for between $2,000 and $3,000, which they falsely portray as an extension of the vehicle's original warranty. The seller of extended auto warranties sued by the FTC allegedly took in more than $10 million on the sale of these deceptively marketed service contracts. In their robocalls, the companies dialed every phone number within a particular area code and prefix sequentially, without knowing whether the consumers called were motorists or owned motor vehicles, or whether those consumers' numbers were on the Do Not Call Registry. Consumers who asked that the calls be stopped often were met with "abusive behavior" or were simply hung up on, according to the papers filed with the court. Some of the defendants used offshore shell corporations to try to avoid scrutiny, and a top officer in the telemarketing company bragged to prospective clients that he could operate outside the law without any chance of being caught by the FTC, the papers stated. This defendant also claimed that he makes 1.8 million dials per day and that he had done more than $40 million worth of dialing for extended warranty companies, including one billion dials on behalf of his largest client, according to the court papers filed by the FTC. In addition to the robocalls, the FTC charged that the company selling the warranties mails out deceptive postcards to consumers, warning them about the imminent expiration of their auto warranties. The postcards are designed to mislead consumers into believing that they are being contacted by their dealer or manufacturer, and the postcards offer consumers the chance to "renew" their original warranties. On May 15, 2009, U.S. District Judge John F. Grady issued the temporary restraining order against the defendants Transcontinental Warranty Inc. and Voice Touch Inc. Grady's orders also applied to Transcontinental CEO and President Christopher Cowart, Voice Touch executives James and Maureen Dunne, Voice Touch business partner Network Foundations LLC and Network Foundations executive Damian Kohlfeld. Besides ordering a halt to the automatic telephone sales calls, Grady's order froze the assets of the two companies. The FTC alleged in its complaints that the calls were part of a deceptive scheme and asked the court to assure the assets will not be lost in case they might be needed to repay consumers who have been victimized. The FTC isn't immediately seeking civil fines against the companies but may do so later, agency officials said. Attorneys general in Arkansas, Indiana and Missouri have taken similar actions over calls offering extended warranties on automobiles.

==== 2015 ====
After receiving more than 215,000 consumer complaints in 2014 alone, the U.S. Federal Communications Commission (FCC) strengthened and clarified its regulations protecting consumers from unwanted robocalls and spam emails and texts. The Commission issued a package of declaratory rulings in June 2015 that clarified the provisions of the Telephone Consumer Protection Act (TCPA) that deal with prerecorded and artificial voice calls received by residential wireline phones as well as wireless numbers.

==== 2021 ====
In 2021 the Federal Communications Commission ("FCC") released an order imposing strict limits on the number of non-telemarketing, prerecorded or artificial voice calls that can be made to residential phone lines without prior consent. The automated landline calls will also be required to include an opt-out mechanism, and callers must implement the FCC's internal do-not-call list rules—which previously applied only to telemarketing calls.

The new order sets a limit of three calls during any consecutive 30-day period for all non-commercial calls, commercial calls that do not contain an advertisement and calls from charities. HIPAA-related residential robocalls are limited to one call per day up to three calls per week. In setting these new limits, the FCC interpreted the TRACED Act to require it to restrict the number of these types of calls to consumers, despite arguments that the TRACED Act’s language was discretionary.

==== 2022 ====
International incoming robocalls were blocked by the FCC "from entering American phone networks."

==== 2023 ====
In 2023, it was reported that 48 U.S. states were suing Avid Telecom, an American telecommunications company providing VoIP services in relation to robocalling. The company has stated that it will defend itself "vigorously" against the states' allegations.

== See also ==
- Artificial intelligence and elections
- CAN-SPAM Act of 2003 – American law to regulate bulk e-mail
- Canvassing – Systematic initiation of direct contact with individuals
- Ringless voicemail – Voicemail that does not make the phone ring
- Truth in Caller ID Act of 2009 – US legislation regarding caller ID spoofing
- Voice broadcasting
