= Junk fax =

Unsolicited advertising via fax

Junk faxes are a form of telemarketing where unsolicited advertisements are sent via fax transmission. Junk faxes are the faxed equivalent of spam or junk mail. Proponents of this advertising medium often use the terms broadcast fax or fax advertising to avoid the negative connotation of the term junk fax. Junk faxes are generally considered to be a nuisance since they waste toner, ink and paper in fax machines.

== History ==
Junk faxing came into widespread use in the late 1980s as a result of the development and proliferation of relatively inexpensive desktop fax machines which resulted in rapid growth in the number of fax machines in the U.S. The invention of the computer-based fax board in 1985 by Dr. Hank Magnuski, provided an efficient platform for reaching those fax machines with minimal cost and effort.

The fax machines of this period typically used expensive thermal paper and a common complaint about junk faxes was that they consumed that expensive paper without permission, thus shifting the cost of printing the advertisement to the recipient.

In the U.S., the passage of the Telephone Consumer Protection Act in 1991 along with action by individual states reduced the use of junk faxes at that time. However, by the late 1990s, junk faxing had once again become a widespread problem in the U.S., with the entry of a number of large-scale fax broadcasters who boasted of the capacity to send millions of fax advertisements per day. Because the legal restrictions of fax advertising are more widely known today, junk faxes are now predominately used in connection with disreputable or fly-by-night marketers.

== National regulations ==
=== United States ===
The Telephone Consumer Protection Act of 1991 (47 USC 227), or TCPA, among other things specifically outlawed junk faxing:

the use of any telephone facsimile machine, computer, or other device to send an unsolicited advertisement to a telephone facsimile machine (paragraph (b)(1)(C))

The TCPA also requires a fax transmitter to identify the source phone number and transmitting organization or individual on each page. The process of war dialing to determine what phone numbers reach fax machines was also prohibited by the FCC rules under the TCPA.

The TCPA, in particular the junk fax provision, has been challenged in court on First Amendment grounds, but the law has withstood legal challenges.

In 2005, the United States Congress passed the Junk Fax Prevention Act of 2005. It amended the TCPA so as to no longer prohibit unsolicited fax advertisements if:

the unsolicited advertisement is from a sender with an established business relationship with the recipient(paragraph (b)(1)(C)(i))

and the sender complies with other requirements.

In April 2006, the Federal Communications Commission (FCC) implemented changes to the fax advertising rules of the TCPA. The new rules: (1) codify an established business relationship (EBR) exemption to the prohibition on sending unsolicited fax advertisements; (2) define EBR as used in the context of unsolicited fax advertisements; (3) require the sender of fax advertisements to provide specified notice and contact information on the fax that allows recipients to "opt-out" of any future transmissions from the sender; and (4) specify the circumstances under which a request to "opt-out" complies with the Act. The new rules took effect in August 2006.

The federal TCPA permits state junk faxing laws that are equal to or more restrictive than the federal law, and so many states have their own laws regarding junk faxes. Additionally, some courts have ruled that unsolicited fax advertisements are common law conversion, independent of any statutory provisions or exemptions.

==== Enforcement ====
The FCC can investigate violations and impose fines on the violators. Individuals who receive junk faxes can file a complaint with the FCC. Complaints must specify:

- That the sender did not have permission to send the fax (i.e. unsolicited)
- That the complainant did not have a prior business relationship with the sender
- That the fax was for a good or service
- Any telephone number or addresses included in the fax
- Your name, address, and a telephone number where you can be reached during the day
- The telephone number through which you received the fax advertisement
- A copy of the fax advertisement, if possible, or confirmation that you have retained a copy of the fax

Failure to provide any of the above information may result in the complaint being closed without further action.

State authorities can also take actions against violations of the TCPA.

It is also possible for the recipient of a junk fax to bring a private suit against the violator in an appropriate court of their state. Through a private suit, the recipient can either recover the actual monetary loss that resulted from the TCPA violation, or receive $500 in damages for each violation, whichever is greater. The court may triple the damages for each violation if it finds that the defendant acted willingly or knowingly. The FCC and/or the FTC can impose additional civil penalties of up to $11,000.00 per fax transmitted.

=== United Kingdom ===
According to the government legislation on 1 May 1999, it is unlawful to send an individual an unsolicited sales and marketing fax without any prior consent of the customer. If the fax receiver is a company or corporate instances, fax communications are permitted unless the subscriber has previously notified the caller that such communications should not be sent on that line; or the subscriber’s line is listed in the register kept under regulation 25 of PECR. This register is maintained on behalf of OFCOM by the Direct Marketing Association and is branded as the Facsimile Preference Service ("FPS").

=== Canada ===
Unsolicited faxes are regulated by the Canadian Radio-television and Telecommunications Commission (CRTC) and must follow certain guidelines, but there is no individual right to sue the senders. Information on the rules of telemarketing faxes in Canada can be found in the CRTC Unsolicited Telecommunications Rules. Individuals wishing to avoid such faxes may enroll in the CRTC's National Do Not Call List; its effectiveness, however, is a point of controversy.

=== Hong Kong ===
The Office of the Telecommunications Authority (OTA) has implemented regulations to address junk faxes. Complaints will result in disconnection of the offenders' phone service.

== See also ==
- Black fax
