= Reloading scam =

Confidence trick used by fraudsters

In a reloading scam, a victim is repeatedly approached by con artists, often until "sucked dry". This form of fraud is perpetrated on those more susceptible to pressure after the first losses, perhaps because of hopes to recover money previously invested, perhaps because of inability to say "no" to a con man.

The term has been current at least since 1923, when it was used to describe a specific repetitive stock fraud:

To "reload" a holder of stock, he is approached with an offer to buy from him a larger block of the stock at a higher price than he paid, and about the same time the opportunity is given to him to purchase more at the original offering price. When he has done so, he finds that the bid is an elusive one; it is now for a larger block, and if he buys still more stock in order to take advantage of it, it still keeps ahead of him.

The term 'reloading' has since expanded to cover all repeated attempts to scam money from the same victim.

This form is widespread because people who become victims of, for example, a telemarketing fraud, often are placed on a sucker list. Sucker lists, which include names, addresses, phone numbers and other information, are created, bought and sold by some fraudulent telemarketers. They are considered invaluable because dishonest promoters know that consumers who have been tricked once are likely to be tricked again.

== How the scam works ==
Double scammers, known as reloaders, use several methods to repeatedly victimize consumers. For example, if they have lost money to a fraudulent telemarketing scheme, they may get a call from someone claiming to work for a government agency, private company or consumer organization that could recover their lost money, product or prize—for a fee. The catch is that the second caller is often as phony as the first and may even work for the company that took their money in the first place. If they pay the recovery fee, they have been double-scammed.

Some local government agencies and consumer organizations really do provide help to consumers who have lost money to fraudulent promoters. However, the vast majority of them offer their services for free.

Buyers of worthless shares of stock are sometimes approached with schemes to revive the original bankrupt companies. All the victim needs to do to save his original investment is to contribute so much per share. Doing this after bad appeals to those reluctant to admit that they made a bad investment.

Another reloading scam uses prize incentives to convince a person to continue buying merchandise. If they buy, they may get a second call, claiming they are eligible to win a more valuable prize. The second caller makes them think that buying more merchandise increases their chances of winning. If they take the bait, they may be called yet again with the same sales pitch. The only difference is that the caller now claims that they are a "grand prize" finalist and, if they buy even more, they could win the "grand prize".

Fraudulent promoters involved in reloading scams want payment as quickly as possible—usually by credit card or a check delivered to them by courier. Often, it takes at least several weeks to receive products and prizes. When they do arrive, buyers often find that they have overpaid for shoddy goods, and that they did not win the "grand prize" at all. Unfortunately, their credit card has long since been charged or their check cashed.

== Protection ==
=== In the US ===
The Federal Trade Commission and other agencies recommend to be wary of people who claim to work for companies, consumer organizations, or government agencies that recover money for a fee. Legitimate organizations, such as national, state, and local consumer enforcement agencies and non-profit organizations, like the National Fraud Information Center (NFIC) or Call For Action (CFA), do not charge for their services or guarantee results. One must also be wary of promoters who contact you several times and urge you to buy more merchandise to increase your chances of winning valuable prizes. Other advice based on common sense may be found.

=== In the UK ===
The Office of Fair Trading (OFT) are the main protectors of consumer issues. People in the UK are also able to be protected by the Telephone Preference Service (TPS), as if they are subscribed to it, they should not receive unsolicited calls.

== See also ==
- Sucker list
- Liar Game – a manga that makes frequent use of the scam
