= PrivacyStar =

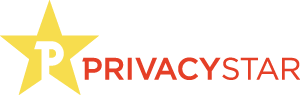
- Founded: Conway, AR, United States (2008)
- Headquarters: 520 N Main St Suite 400, North Little Rock, AR 72114
- Area served: United States and Canada
- Key people: Charles Morgan (Chairman & CEO); Jeff Stalnaker (President & Co-Founder); Craig Dunn (COO)
- Industry: Privacy/Telecom
- Website: privacystar.com
- Current status: Active

PrivacyStar is a service that identifies who is calling and why, and provides for call complaint filing which reports to the Federal Trade Commission. The PrivacyStar service is available on the web and on mobile applications for Android and iOS. On several applications powered by PrivacyStar, call and text blocking is available. The applications, along with PrivacyStar’s iPhone Lookup+ application, enable users to file potential debt collector and telemarketer violations directly to the FTC. The application captures detailed information about possible Fair Debt Collection Practices Act violations including date, time, number, and identity and allows users to easily provide this information to regulatory agencies so they may take action. PrivacyStar has over 1.2 million users who have blocked over 120 million calls and filed over 300,000 complaints directly with the Federal Trade Commission as of September 2012. In fact, PrivacyStar is the leading source of all call complaint data reported to the FTC. In 2015, its users filed 31% of all call complaints. On February 13, 2013, PrivacyStar launched a free SMS spam complaint filing feature for Android smartphones. The application allows users to file text message spam complaints in addition to the existing ability to file call complaints directly to the Federal Trade Commission from their Android phones.

== History ==
Founded in 2008 by Jeff Stalnaker and Josh Smith, PrivacyStar is based in Little Rock, Arkansas. Jeff Stalnaker is the president and CEO of the company. Prior to PrivacyStar, Stalnaker held the position of Division President of the financial services division at Acxiom, a marketing company. Josh Smith is the COO of PrivacyStar. Charles Morgan is the executive chairman of the board of First Orion Corp., a private company that developed and markets PrivacyStar.

== See also ==
- First Orion
- Call blocking
- National Do Not Call Registry
- Consumer privacy
