= Data & Marketing Association =

American trade organization for marketers

The Data & Marketing Association (DMA), formerly the Direct Marketing Association, is a trade organization for marketers. Although headquartered in the United States, its members include companies from 48 other countries, including half of the Fortune 100 companies, as well as many non-profit organizations. The DMA seeks to advance all forms of direct marketing.

A mid-2018 joint announcement with the Association of National Advertisers (ANA), stated thus, "to be completed as of July 1, 2018" and having as its goal "the single largest trade association in the U.S. devoted to serving all aspects of marketing" had not materialized as of the projected date.

As of July 1, 2019, DMA became the Data, Marketing & Analytics arm of the ANA.

== Objectives ==
Its stated objectives are to advance and protect responsible data-driven marketing.

Data-driven marketing can include any marketing where consumer data is used for marketing purposes, usually to create a more customized experience – like presenting custom offers in an email, recognizing a regular customer on a website, providing benefits through a loyalty program, showing recommendations on a website, or inclusion other special customer groups. It can include many marketing channels, such as postal mail, email, social, inserts, web advertising, publishing/content marketing and search.

Members of DMA agree to comply with strict guidelines, which set ethical standards for the right way to use data responsibly in marketing. These cover aspects like privacy, data collection, consumer notice, use of data and other aspects of responsible marketing. DMA enforces these guidelines, accepting complaints from consumers or other companies, and after a member review of the practices and allowing the company to change any non-compliant practices, then publishes a list of "bad actors". These non compliance companies are also reported to the appropriate authorities.

In addition to supporting those industry standards and agreeing to follow the Member Principles, companies that use data in marketing join DMA to network, grow their business, train their staff and participate in advocacy efforts. DMA does not address the use of consumer data for other, non-marketing uses.

== History ==
The DMA was founded in 1917 as the Direct Mail Marketing Association. Over the next few decades it became

- the Direct Marketing Association and then
- the Data & Marketing Association.

The organization launched the International ECHO Awards in 1929.

As of when John Gitlitz left the American Advertising Federation in 1981 to become president/CEO of the DMA, the latter's headquarters were in NYC, although their Washington DC office was important to them.

== Consumer options ==
A Washington Post 2018 review of what some people call "junk mail" and its professional defenders "the Data & Marketing Association (formerly the Direct Marketing Association)" call "direct mail" notes that, since.

- Surveys by the US Postal Service finds more than half of all millennials "find marketing mail valuable" and
- Marketers have found "the response rate to physical mail is over five times that of email"

direct marketers "would rather not spend their money sending direct mail to people who don’t want to receive it."

While getting off their list is not free, the article said that "The service costs $2 and lasts for 10 years".

The same article noted that "credit card offers are one of the biggest categories in your mailbox" and that one can opt out of these at no cost. Details can be found at DMAChoice.org.

Consumer complaints about marketing practices are also accepted at the thedma.org website.

Criticism of the DMA includes that compliance is voluntary; that enforcement is limited; and that the requirement for consumers to opt out of direct marketing, rather than opting in, favours marketers by making direct marketing the default.

== International Federation of Direct Marketing Associations ==
23 direct marketing trade associations from five continents established the International Federation of Direct Marketing Associations (IFDMA) in 1989.

IFDMA was formed to develop firm lines of communications between direct marketers around the world, and is dedicated to

- improving the practice and communicating the value of direct marketing and
- promoting the highest standards for ethical conduct and effective self-regulation of the direct marketing community.

Specifically, the organization and its members

- Makes available information regarding consumer safeguards, and publicizes DMA as their protector, contact point and regulator.
- Tries to ensure that members create consumer confidence.
- Advises how companies should use information by operating within the terms of Data Protection Acts.
- Lobbies against
  - Data Protection Acts which protect data against redistribution
  - Laws forbidding e-mail address harvesting.

They also:

- Fight negative images of the direct marketing industry
- Promote direct marketing techniques and companies to consumers
- Prove training and professional development opportunities to marketers
- Conduct industry research
- Host networking conferences for marketers

=== National Members of IFDMA ===
The first president of IFDMA, Colin Lloyd, is president at the Direct Marketing Association in Britain.

==== UK DMA ====
Although the UK DMA is based in the United Kingdom, its 1,000+ members, which include companies from other countries, are

- major brand clients
- charities
- advertising and digital agencies and
- suppliers of direct marketing services.

Headquarters is in London; there are three regional offices. Together they represent the whole of the United Kingdom, Scotland, Northern Ireland and Wales.

UK DMA

- gives advice how companies should use information by operating within the terms of the UK Data Protection Act.
- manages the industry's preference services:
  - the Corporate Telephone Preference Service (CTPS)

These services are designed to make consumers aware of the services that stop mail, email, telephone and fax marketing to them as individuals

== Controversy ==
Direct Marketing Associations have attracted controversy, as people believe they aim to promote spam and to defend junk mail and unsolicited telemarketing, which many consumers find irritating and intrusive. They have been accused, by The Spamhaus Project and Electronic Frontier Foundation respectively, of promoting spam and working against open standards (i.e., Do Not Track) that seek to protect consumer privacy from tracking by online marketers. They have also been accused of using a "limited", unrealistic definition of spam.

ICO Case Reference Number IC-138413-V0L3. Available upon request from the ICO. The DMA received a complaint of marketing to a personal email address without compliance of data protection legislation and PECR. On 26 Oct 2021 the DMA stated "it is not direct marketing and does not involve personal data it does not require a legal basis." Despite the DMA being listed as a member of its own organisation, The Data and marketing commission (DMC) refused to investigate. "We do agree with you that matters should be investigated openly and impartially. The position of the Commission, however, remains the same as last October when we corresponded. The Commission only investigates complaints against members of the Data & Marketing Association and the Association would not constitute a member of its own Association. It does appear from the screenshot that you sent over that the Association is listed however, and I will let them know. Looking at the Association address on the screenshot it states 'test' so I think this is probably a technical error."

On 27 April 2022 the DMA was deemed to have not complied with their data protection obligations.

== Data sources ==
Marketers and marketing organizations have been using data collection and analysis to refine their operations for the last few decades. Marketing departments in organizations and marketing companies conduct data collection and analysis by collecting data from different data sources and analyzing them to come up with insightful data they can use for strategic decision-making (Baier et al., 2012). In the modern business environment, data has evolved into a crucial asset for businesses since businesses use data as a strategic asset that is used regularly to create a competitive advantage and improve customer experiences. Among the most significant forms of data is customer information which is a critical asset used to assess customer behavior and trends and use it for developing new strategies for improving customer experience (Ahmed, 2004). However, data has to be of high quality to be used as a business asset for creating a competitive advantage. Therefore, data governance is a critical element of data collection and analysis since it determines the quality of data while integrity constraints guarantee the reliability of information collected from data sources. Various technologies including Big Data are used by businesses and organizations to allow users to search for specific information from raw data by grouping it based on the preferred criteria marketing departments in organizations could apply for developing targeted marketing strategies (Ahmed, 2004). As technology evolves, new forms of data are being introduced for analysis and classification purposes in marketing organizations and businesses. The introduction of new gadgets such as Smartphones and new-generation PCs has also introduced new data sources from which organizations can collect, analyze and classify data when developing marketing strategies. Retail businesses are the business category that uses customer data from smart devices and websites to understand how their current and targeted customers perceive their services before using the information to make improvements and increase customer satisfaction (Cerchiello and Guidici, 2012). Analyzing customer data is crucial for businesses since it allows marketing teams to understand customer behavior and trends which makes a considerable difference during the development of new marketing campaigns and strategies. Retailers who use customer data from various sources gain an advantage in the market since they can develop data-informed strategies for attracting and retaining customers in the overly competitive business environment. Based on the information on the benefits of data collection and analysis, the following hypotheses are proposed: The sources of data used as the foundation of data collection and analysis have a considerable impact on the data analysis tools used for analyzing and categorizing data.

== Telemarketing legislation ==
The United States National Do Not Call Registry, went into effect in 2003. Under the law, it is illegal for telemarketers to call anyone who has registered themselves on the list. After the list had operated for one year, over 62 million people had signed up. The telemarketing industry opposed the creation of the list, but most telemarketers have complied with the law and refrained from calling people who are on the list.

Canada has passed legislation to create a similar Do Not Call List. In other countries it is voluntary, such as the New Zealand Name Removal Service.

== See also ==
- American Association of Advertising Agencies
- Data Protection Act 1998
- Direct Marketing Ass'n v. Brohl
- Direct Marketing Association (South Africa)
