= Telephone Preference Service =

United Kingdom's official do not call list

The Telephone Preference Service (TPS) is the United Kingdom's official do not call list. It allows businesses and individuals to opt out of unsolicited marketing calls.

Similar do not call lists are implemented in other countries, such as the National Do Not Call Registry in the United States, and the Do Not Call Register in Australia.

The Telephone Preference Service (TPS) is the only such register that is enforced by law in the UK. TPS was created in 1996 by the Data & Marketing Association (DMA). In 1999, it was made a statutory requirement and was included in the Privacy and Electronic Communications Regulations (PECR).

TPSL is a wholly owned subsidiary of the DMA, who run the TPS under contract from the Information Commissioner's Office (ICO). Funding for TPS comes entirely from organisations that licence the TPS file, neither the ICO nor the government provide any funding.

Marketers that wish to make telephone calls are legally obliged to screen their lists against the TPS. They can get access to the TPS file by licensing it directly from TPSL or from a ‘list cleaner’ that provides TPS screening services to third parties.

If a telephone number is registered with the TPS/CTPS, organisations are legally required – by the Privacy and Electronic (EC Directive) Regulations 2003 – to refrain from calling it. In the UK, the Information Commissioner's Office (ICO) enforces the law and has power to fine firms that break it.

There are many organisations who comply with their obligations under the above regulations, however, as with any law there are those that choose not to comply, and these are in most cases the companies who are making these calls to consumers who have registered their preference (with TPS) as wanting to opt out of receipt of unsolicited direct marketing calls.

Registration with the TPS doesn't physically restrict a telephone line, so it can't stop anyone from dialling a number. Calls from friends and family or any other calls where the caller is not selling a product or service, are not subject to TPS restrictions.

However, if the purpose of the call is sales or marketing, organisations are legally obliged to screen their call lists against the TPS. They must not make an unsolicited direct marketing call to a number registered with the TPS. Service-related calls from banks, credit card companies and so on are not subject to TPS restriction.

The only exception to the TPS register is where a registered individual gives an organisation specific permission to contact them as this then falls out of TPS remit.

TPS does not stop other call types such as market research, debt collection, scam calls and general nuisance calls.

== History ==
Residential users have been able to register on the list since May 1999 under the Telecommunications (Data Protection and Privacy) Regulations 1999. The list has statutory force under the Privacy and Electronic Communications (EC Directive) Regulations 2003. From 25 June 2004 corporate subscribers were also allowed to register on the list under Privacy and Electronic Communications (EC Directive) (Amendment) Regulations 2004. In 2012 the enforcement powers of the ICO and penalties were much strengthened; the governmental organisation responsible for enforcing the law (ICO) have the power to impose fines of up to £500,000 on lawbreakers.

== Registration and complaints ==
Customers can register their number(s) to TPS via their website, or by telephone. You can also register via your mobile phone by simply texting “TPS” and your email address to 85095 from your mobile phone. Once registered, the customer must allow 28 days for the registration to become fully effective. Complaints can be made via the site, TPS will then contact the company and warn them they are breaching the regulations and ask them to add your number to their own Do Not Call list. All complaints investigated by TPS are referred to the ICO and are incorporated into their investigation into nuisance calls. It is the ICO's enforcement team who will engage in further dialogue, as they best see fit. They are empowered to take enforcement action accordingly.

== Enforcement ==
In addition to fines, the ICO publishes details of any formal action it takes against organisations on its website and in press releases. Enforcement of the TPS legislation is now a top priority and they have increased the size of its enforcement department to deal with the increased number of complaints it's received from the public over the past year.

== Companies claiming to offer call banning ==
There are various companies offering services that claim will stop unsolicited calls. TPS is not associated to any of those companies. They may be commercial companies offering services, for which they charge a fee, and some may be fraudulent. “our advice is NOT to pay them”. TPS is a free service for consumers wanting to register and the only official service that calling companies are required by law to comply with, it is regulated and enforced by the Information Commissioners Office (ICO).

== Unwanted calls not covered by TPS ==
=== Calls with consent (solicited) ===
Telephone subscribers who have at some time consented to be called—perhaps by filling in a long-forgotten Web form years ago with a box to tick "if you don't want to receive further information", or a firm of which the subscriber is a customer—may legally be called unless they explicitly withdraw the implied permission given to the organisation concerned. A ticked box—or an unticked "no" box—on a form from a trusted organisation agreeing to permit calls from "other carefully selected organisations" can allow a huge variety of calls.

A call is considered to fall within the TPS remit if it is unsolicited and relates to the sale or marketing of a product or service during a live telephone conversation.

=== Silent calls ===
Silent calls, calls which remain silent when answered are typically generated by companies using power or predictive dialling equipment when making outbound calls. A power/predictive dialler is an automated dialler which can store, access, and automatically dial telephone numbers which should match operator availability. However, some companies may not have set their dialling rate correctly and this means that individuals are receiving calls, where upon answering there is silence.

Silent calls you have received can be reported to the Telecommunications Regulator, Ofcom.

=== Recorded calls ===
Organisations that use recorded phone messages (robocalls) for marketing or sales calls must have prior consent from the subscriber. Unauthorised robocalls from an identified caller can be reported to the ICO.

=== Market research ===
The TPS does not cover market research calls. The regulation relating to TPS is the Privacy and Electronic (EC Directive) Communication Regulations 2003. The aspect of this regulation relating to TPS is specific to live unsolicited direct marketing calls, this does not extend to research/survey calls.

There are existing processes to deal with unwanted market research calls. The first port of call is to notify the organisation that you do not wish to participate in their research and request that they suppress your details. If they continue to call you, you may wish to contact the Market Research Society who may be able to act if the call was from one of their members.

=== Overseas call ===
TPS will investigate unsolicited direct marketing calls from overseas made on behalf of a company that has a UK presence. Complaints about calls from companies with no UK presence can be made to the ICO. The ICO co-operates with similar organisations in Europe, the European Commission and other countries. UK organisations cannot themselves regulate or prevent calls to UK numbers being made from overseas.

If you receive an unsolicited sales and/or marketing call from an overseas company, you should contact the Information Commissioner's Office (ICO).

=== Debt collection ===
Organisations looking to recover debts are not required to screen their data against the TPS register. Such calls, in cases where they are not allowed, can be reported to the local Trading Standards Office. Debt collection callers to a number for someone not at that number can be told not to call again; if they continue to call, the ICO may be able to help from a data protection perspective.

Non direct marketing calls including debt collection falls outside of the remits within which the TPS operates. If the organisation is making debt collection calls to your number for a debt not owed, please seek advice from your local Trading Standards.

== See also ==
- Do not call list
- Robinson list
- Canadian Do Not Call List
- New Zealand Name Removal Service
- United States National Do Not Call Registry
