= Canadian Marketing Association =

The Canadian Marketing Association (CMA) is a national not-for-profit trade association. It was established in 1967, and is managed by full-time professional staff based in Toronto. An elected Board of Directors determines policies, whereby member organizations are required to comply with CMA's code of ethics.

CMA provides these public offerings:

- Do Not Contact service, whereby consumers register without charge to have their names removed from marketing lists held by CMA member organizations
- A customer complaint resolution program.
- The Chartered Marketer designation.

CMA offers professional marketing certificate courses nationwide. Other educational initiatives include conferences, seminars, in-house training, roundtables, webinars, and the CMA Awards Gala program. CMA forms internal task forces to develop self-regulatory policies on important marketing issues.
