= Silent call =

Call where no audio is transmitted

A silent call is a telephone call in which the calling party does not speak when the call is answered. Most such calls are generated by a cold call telemarketing operation's dialer software, which makes many calls automatically and sometimes does not have an agent immediately available to handle an answered call. As a result, the called party hears silence ("dead air"), followed by the call being disconnected. This differs from a ghost call, which is not dialed intentionally, and is due to technical issues or pocket dialing.

In the U.S., the Federal Trade Commission (FTC) uses the term "abandoned call" instead of silent call in its regulations applying to telemarketing.
