= Sucker list =

List of people who have previously made a donation or fallen for a scam

A sucker list is a list of people who have previously fallen for a scam such as a telemarketing fraud, lottery scam, high-yield investment program, get-rich-quick scheme, or work-at-home schemes, or, as used by charities, someone who made a donation. The lists are usually sold to scammers or charities.

After the list is sold, the victims may be called by scammers promising to recover the money they lost or the prize or merchandise they never received, in an advance-fee scam.

An early example of sucker lists is mentioned an 18 November 1929 article in Time which described a list of people who contributed to a lobbyist fund.

Yet another usage was described in the movie Sucker List, a part of the 1941 United States series Crime Does Not Pay. The subject of the movie are fraudulent racetrack touts, who, in particular, used to call people known to be in deep debt and give them false tips.

== See also ==
- Reloading scam
- Trigger list
