= List of marketing opt-out registries =

List to opt-out of receiving marketing

Various countries have opt-out registries for people to indicate that they do not wish to receive marketing solicitations. These are known by various names, such as a do not call list or Robinson list. The marketing contacts involved can be via e-mail, postal mail, telephone, or fax. In each case, contact details will be placed on a blacklist, and violations may be punishable by fines. Some countries maintain do not call lists of phone numbers that are off-limits to telemarketers. Do not call lists may also sometimes be required to be maintained privately by a company, listing numbers that they will not call.

The "Robinson list" name is derived from Robinson Crusoe, a fictional character shipwrecked and stranded for years on a remote island.

== Examples ==
Country	Organization	Name	Excludes	Ref.
Australia	Australian Communications and Media Authority	Do Not Call Register	Phone	
Argentina	AAIP	Registro Nacional No Llame "National Do Not Call Registry"	Phone	
Belgium	Belgian Association of Marketing	Robinson list	Mail	
Belgium		Bel me niet meer "Do not call me"	Phone	
United Kingdom	Data & Marketing Association	Telephone Preference Service	Phone	
United Kingdom	Data & Marketing Association	Mailing Preference Service (The MPS list)	Mail	
Canada	Canadian Radio-television and Telecommunications Commission	National Do Not Call List	Phone	
Canada	Canada Post	Consumers' Choice program	Mail (unaddressed)	
Canada	Canada Post	Addressed advertising reduction	Mail (addressed)	
Finland	Data & Marketing Association of Finland	Mailing and telephone preference services	Mail, phone	
France		Liste orange; "Orange List"		
France		Bloctel		
Italy	Fondazione Ugo Bordoni	Registro Pubblico delle Opposizioni; "Public Registry of Oppositions"		
Spain	Asociación Española de Economía Digital	Robinson list		
Sweden	NIX-Telefon	NIX-registret; "The NIX registry"	Phone	
United States	Federal Trade Commission	National Do Not Call Registry	Phone	
United States	Association of National Advertisers	Dmachoice.org	Mail	
United States	Equifax, Experian, Innovis, and TransUnion	Optoutprescreen.com	Prescreened credit card & insurance offer mail	
New Zealand	The Marketing Association	New Zealand Name Removal Service	Mail, phone	
Singapore	Personal Data Protection Commission	Do Not Call Registry	Phone	
India	Telecom Regulatory Authority of India	National Customer Preference Register	Phone	
UAE		National Do Not Call Registry	Phone	

== See also ==
- Direct marketing
- Email marketing
- Advertising mail
