= Citizens for Civil Discourse =

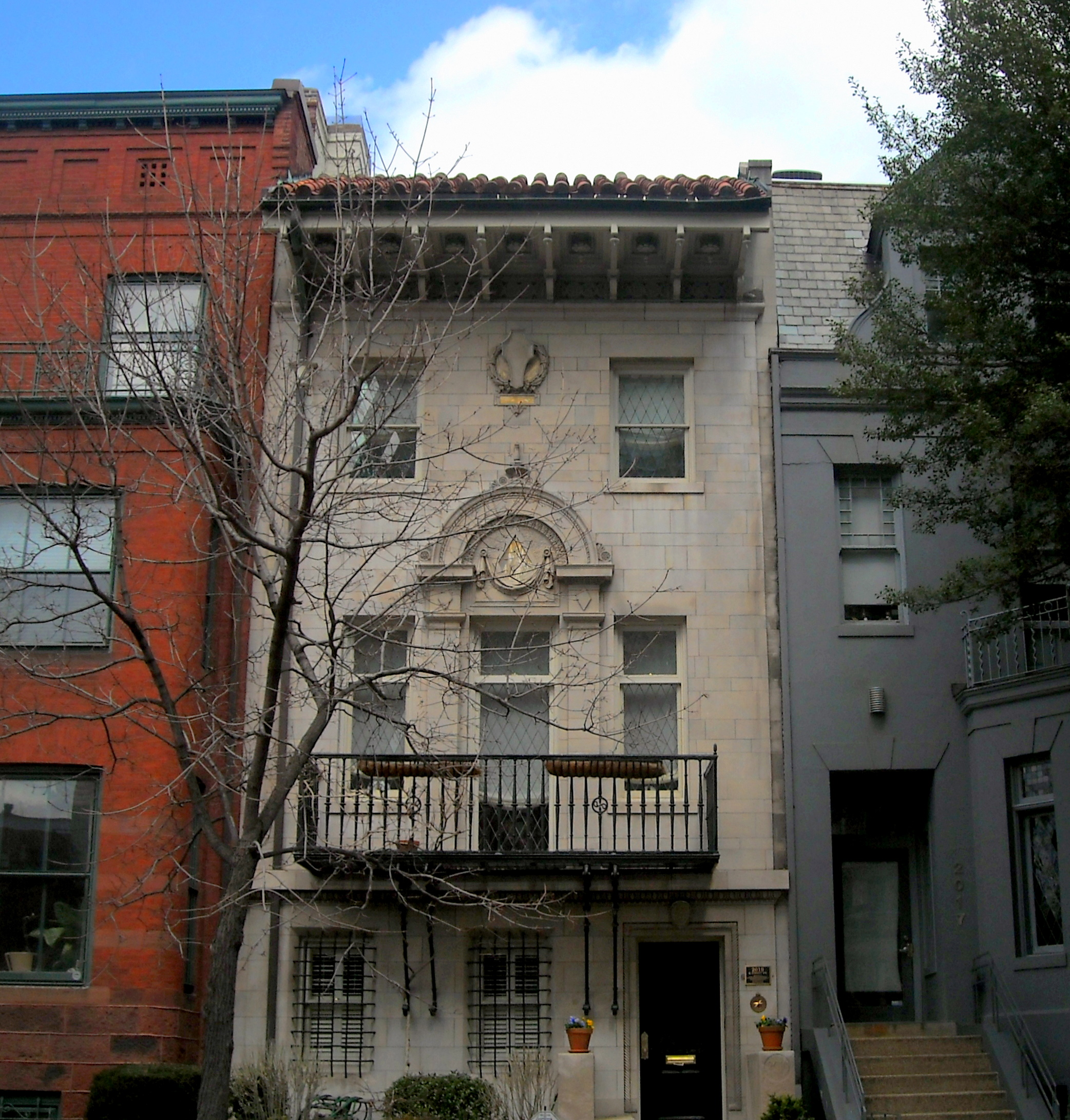
The Citizens for Civil Discourse headquarters located in the Dupont Circle neighborhood of Washington, D.C.

Citizens for Civil Discourse, also known as CCD, is an American non-profit, non-partisan organization that accepts Robocall block requests from citizens via their website. Shaun Dakin, the group's CEO, was a former campaign worker for John Kerry during the 2004 presidential election.

== Website ==
Stop Political Calls is the name of the organization's website to compile a database of the "National Political Do Not Contact Registry". Automated calls for political purposes are not illegal, and the requests in the database have no legal standing. As of late October 2008 after heavy media coverage nationwide, the block requests were voluntarily supported by only three Democrats and three Republicans. Of those six, only three of the politicians were actually on the November 2008 ballot.
