= Ringless voicemail =

Voicemail that does not make the phone ring

Ringless voicemail, also called direct-to-voicemail or a voicemail drop, is a method of delivering a prerecorded voice message to a recipient's voicemail inbox without the recipient's telephone ringing. Depending on the implementation, the recipient may still receive a voicemail notification or message-waiting indicator after the message is deposited.

The practice has been described using several terms in regulatory and media sources. In Canadian records, it was discussed in connection with a service described as "voicecasting," while U.S. reporting has used terms such as "direct-to-voicemail" and "voicemail drop."

== History ==
=== Canada ===
A service described as depositing prerecorded messages directly into voicemail inboxes without ringing was discussed in Canadian proceedings under the term "voicecasting." Infolink Communications Ltd. reported providing such a service as early as 1997.

=== United States ===
In the United States, direct-to-voicemail services were reported in the late 2000s, including consumer-facing services such as Slydial.

In 2022, the Federal Communications Commission (FCC) issued a declaratory ruling that ringless voicemail messages to wireless phones require consumer consent because they constitute a “call” made using an artificial or prerecorded voice for purposes of the Telephone Consumer Protection Act (TCPA).

== Regulation and legal status ==
=== United States ===
Under the TCPA and FCC rules, calls to wireless numbers that use an artificial or prerecorded voice generally require prior express consent. In a 2022 declaratory ruling, the FCC concluded that ringless voicemail to wireless phones falls within the TCPA’s coverage because it is a "call" using an artificial or prerecorded voice, and the FCC rejected arguments that depositing a voicemail without ringing should be treated differently.

=== Canada ===
In Canada, telemarketing and related unsolicited communications are governed through the CRTC’s Unsolicited Telecommunications Rules and related decisions and notices. In a 2006 public notice reviewing telemarketing rules, the CRTC stated that voicecasting was not subject to rules pursuant to Telecom Decision 2004-65.

== Technology ==
Ringless voicemail is implemented by routing a prerecorded message into a voicemail system without completing a conventional ringing call to the recipient’s handset. Descriptions of implementations refer to interaction with carrier voicemail platforms or voicemail infrastructure to deposit the message directly, sometimes resulting in a message-waiting indicator or notification even though the phone did not ring.

One patented approach (associated with Mobilesphere Ltd. through its Slydial and Slybroadcast apps) describes initiating signaling intended to route a subsequent connection to a carrier-provided voicemail facility without alerting the recipient as a normal incoming call.
