= Do Not Call Register =

The Australian national Do Not Call Register scheme was set up in Australia to regulate the activities of telemarketers who make unsolicited telephone calls to private individuals or who send unsolicited faxes. The scheme is free and applies to home, mobile or fax numbers. A number of categories of organisations are exempt from the Register prohibitions, including government bodies, registered political parties, MPs, political candidates, charities and educational organisations. As of April 2013, the Register had 8.5 million numbers listed.

The Australian Communications and Media Authority (ACMA) is responsible for establishing and overseeing the Register and enforces compliance with the DNCR Act and related industry standards. In September 2014, Salmat was awarded the contract to operate the Register, commencing in mid-2015.

Members of the public can make complaints about telemarketing calls and marketing faxes to ACMA, which may also conduct formal investigations and take enforcement action.

The Do Not Call Register scheme gives Australians the opportunity to 'opt-out' of receiving most telemarketing calls and marketing faxes. It is against the law for telemarketers to make unsolicited calls or to send marketing faxes to a number on the register without consent. The best way a telemarketer or fax marketer can ensure they comply with the DNCR Act is to check their list against the register at least every 30 days, prior to making marketing calls or faxes.

== History ==
The Australian Parliament passed the Do Not Call Register Act 2006 (DNCR Act) on 30 June 2006 to established the Do Not Call Register. The Do Not Call Register and the Industry Standard commenced on 1 May 2007. On the first day, the website was inundated with traffic and apparently "crashed" under the load.

In September 2014, Salmat, an Australian multichannel marketing company, was awarded the contract to operate the Do Not Call Register on behalf of the Australian Communications and Media Authority.

== Function ==
The Telemarketing and Research Calls Industry Standard 2007 sets out rules about when and how telemarketing calls can be made and applies regardless of whether numbers called are on the Do Not Call Register or not. Some exemptions apply. The Fax Marketing Industry Standard 2011 sets out rules about when and how marketing faxes can be sent.

Individuals can place home, fax or mobile numbers on the Register, provided that the number is used primarily for domestic purposes. After it has been added, telemarketers have 30 days to cease calling it, and the number remains on the register permanently. Certain organisations, however, are exempt from this, specifically charities, religious organisations, educational institutions, government bodies, registered political parties/candidates, or any organisation for which the individual has given consent (explicit or inferred) for their number to be called, which can be withdrawn at any time. Market research is not considered to be telemarketing and is also exempt, although these calls are also subject to the industry standard.

It is an offence for a non-exempt organisation to call a number on the Do Not Call Register; organisations that do so may be fined. Individuals who receive telemarketing calls when their number is on the register can submit a complaint to the Australian Communications and Media Authority.

Even for organisations that are exempt or for whom consent has been provided, the industry standard developed in conjunction with the register places limits on the times at which calls can be made, requires that calls be terminated upon request, and requires that telemarketers provide certain information to the called party. Telemarketers must provide contact information, enable Caller ID, and reveal upon request how they obtained the recipient's telephone number.

== Reception ==
The register has attracted criticism for not attempting to curb unsolicited calls from charities and political parties and for not allowing the inclusion of small business numbers on the register.

== See also ==
- New Zealand Name Removal Service
- National Do Not Call Registry (United States)
- Telephone Preference Service (United Kingdom)
- National Do Not Call List (Canada)
