= Salmat =

- Type: Publicly listed company
- Traded as: ASX: SLM
- Industry: Internet marketing
- Founded: 1979 in Sydney, Australia
- Founders: Phil Salter; Peter Mattick
- Headquarters: Sydney, Australia
- Area served: Australia; Asia
- Key people: Phil Salter (Founder); Peter Mattick (Co-Founder); Rebecca Lowde (CEO)
- Services: Multichannel marketing
- Revenue: ▲AU$452.8 million
- Number of employees: 4,000+
- Divisions: Targeted Media Solutions; Local Direct Network; Lasoo

Salmat was an Australian multichannel marketing company with headquarters in Sydney. Its clients included the Woolworths conglomerate, Target Australia, Telstra and the Government of Australia. Salmat at its peak had over 4,000 employees located in Australia, New Zealand and Asia.

== History ==
Salmat was founded in 1979 in Sydney, Australia by Phil Salter and Peter Mattick as a catalogue distribution company. In 1984, the company received a capital injection from News Limited, which acquired 49% of the company for $5 million after a bidding war with rival newspaper publishers Fairfax. The founders regained full control of the company again in 1998 when they bought back News Limited's stake.

In 2000, the company's revenues reached over $200 million, in 2004 it passed $400 million and passed $800 million in 2008. Driving Salmat's growth was its public listing on the ASX on 2 December 2002. Following the public listing, the company made a series of acquisitions, including SalesForce Australia, one of Australia's largest Call Centre businesses at the time, for $64 million on 6 December 2004, the NSW printing service on 7 March 2005, VeCommerce on 27 July 2006 for $28.7 million, Dialect Interactive on 5 December 2006 for $6 million. The New Zealand targeted media operations Deltarg was sold to New Zealand Post for $1 million as the two organisation established a joint venture call Reach Media. Salmat acquired its largest rival SPA from Kodak Australia for $318 million on 18 July 2007. The HPA acquisition was accompanied by a capital raising that diluted the founders' stake in Salmat from 60% to 40%.

Both Salter and Mattick retired from day-to-day activities in 2009. Salmat sold its business process outsourcing operation to Fuji Xerox in 2012 for $375 million and changed strategic direction from a multichannel to an omni-channel communication company.

Mattick returned as non-executive chairman in 2013. In early 2014, Craig Dower was appointed the company's CEO.

In September 2014, the company was awarded the contract to operate the "Do Not Call Register" on behalf of the Australian Communications and Media Authority.

Phil Salter died on 7 November 2015 of cancer.

On 7 December 2016, the company inadvertently sent out over 2,000 VCE scores to high school students 5 days before the scheduled release on 12 December.

Rebecca Lowde was appointed CEO in 2017.

In 2018, customer experience organisation Probe Group acquired Contact Centre from Salmat.

In November 2019, IVE Group acquired Salmat Marketing Solutions and Reach Media NZ Limited, Salmat’s catalogue distribution businesses in Australia and New Zealand, for $25 million.

In December 2019, Salmat sold its MicroSourcing (Managed Services) business to Probe BPO Holdings for $100 million.

In August 2020, having sold all of its operational divisions, Salmat was wound up and liquidated.

== Awards and recognition ==
The company, its entities and staff have won a number of industry awards over the years.

Salmat's ATO Technical Help Desk won the 2014 Auscontact Victorian Contact Centre of the Year [31–80 FTE], and Salmat MicroSourcing (Philippines) was named the Best Non-Voice Excellence Company of the Year in the International ICT Awards Philippines 2014. The previous year, Salmat's digital catalogue and shopping website, Lasso, won the Best Aggregation Channel at the Online Retail Industry Awards (ORIA) 2013.

In New Zealand, The Ministry of Social Development and Salmat won the 2009 Telecommunications Users Association of New Zealand (TUANZ) Award for the introduction of its VeCommerce, VeConnect, and VeSecure Telephony products into their Work and Income Contact Centre.

Salmat has also won the Work Safety Award from the Government of Western Australia.

== Controversy ==
Salmat has been criticized for abusing a loophole to allow them to pay their workers well under minimum wage by not considering them employees and instead independent contractors. One worker reported earning under one tenth minimum wage for 100 hours of work.

Salmat has also been criticized for requiring its workers to send large sums of unnecessary location and other data to the company in a way that invaded workers' privacy.

== Winding Up ==
At a general meeting of the members of the Company held on 28 August 2020, it was resolved that the Company be wound up and liquidators be appointed. The remaining assets of $133 million were divided up among the 199,000,000 shares in the company for 66.5 cents per share.
