= Auto dialer =

Computer telephony software

In computer telephony, an automatic dialler (shortened to an auto-dialler or more simply in context just a dialler, and also known as an outbound dialler) is a computer system that makes outgoing calls from a call centre to customers from call agents based upon a loaded list of contacts. Whereas automatic call distribution (ACD) distributes inbound calls to a call centre amongst its agents, an auto dialler makes outbound calls and comes in several forms. Auto diallers are responsible for providing management information to call centre operators, including how many outbound calls each agent has handled. In more sophisticated computer telephony systems, a single system handles both ACD of inbound calls and dialling of outbound calls, allowing agents to be switched between the two as traffic volumes require.

In their earlier forms, diallers would be proprietary standalone systems that connected directly to a private branch exchange or even to the public switched telephone network. However, with the advent of customer-owned switching equipment providing call-control interfaces, diallers shrunk to being external adjunct systems that controlled existing switches.

== Types ==
=== Preview ===
In its most primitive "preview" form, an auto-dialler operates by first presenting contact details to the call centre agent on a computer display, who then initiates the call with a mouse gesture, a keyboard press, or some other human input device action. However, this is inefficient from a business perspective, as the result is that agents spend a lot of time waiting through call progress, and when calls are connected listening to answering machine messages and the like.

=== Power dialler ===
The next step up is the "power dialler" form, whereby agents do not become party to the call until the called party has picked up. A power dialler usually dials as many (as yet uncontacted) contacts from its list as the call centre has outgoing circuits available and the agents are not party during call progress. Instead, the power dialler performs answer detection and connects the agent, the system only presenting contact details to the agent (a so-called "screen pop"), when the call has been answered, often filtering out answering machines and fax machines, timing out unanswered (RTNR a.k.a. "ring tone no reply") calls, and performing so-called "hello" detection.

==== Regulations ====
However, this in turn has problems, as if there are more outgoing circuits for making calls than there are agents available, at the point that the dialler has recognized a human it has to drop the call, generating an abandoned nuisance call from the callee's perspective, or wait until an agent is available resulting in a silent call. This was such a problem in some jurisdictions in the early years of the 21st century that government regulators imposed rules upon companies that used auto-diallers; Ofcom in the United Kingdom, for instance, imposing a rule that an auto-dialler had to at minimum play some sort of recorded message identifying the calling party to the called party within 2 seconds of connection, and constitute no more than 3% of the total outbound call volume in a 24-hour period, or the company in charge would pay fines of anywhere between £50,000 (equivalent to £77,236 in 2025) and £2,000,000 (equivalent to £3,089,458 in 2025). One telemarketer hit by fines was Barclaycard who was found by an Ofcom investigation from October 2006 to May 2007 to have broken this rule, having no mechanisms to prevent customers who have received one silent or abandoned call from receiving many other successive ones. After pressure from telemarketing companies, who claimed that this was simply not achievable with the technology of the time, Ofcom extended the permitted period of silence.

=== Predictive dialler ===
Further improvements are thus the "predictive" dialler, which uses heuristics, and the "progressive" dialler, which directly keeps track of agent availability, and does not make further outbound calls where no agent would be available to handle the call when the callee answers. Agent availability is tracked using an application on the agent's computer that enables the agent to log on and register as an available agent.

Using agent availability alone to set the maximum number of parallel outbound calls is not as efficient as it is possible to be, since a large fraction of all calls in practice are RTNR or not answered by humans, meaning that a similar fraction of agents goes unused if an agent being available at the point of call initiation is a requirement. The heuristic approach of "predictive" diallers is based upon how long agents have remained on calls to predict the availability of agents, and how many calls have been answered by humans recently to predict how much instantaneous demand there will be on the available agent pool. However, the heuristic approach that increases agent use also increases the risk of abandoned calls when the heuristic does not make a correct prediction and not enough agents end up being available.

== Sources ==
- Walker, Tim; Morris, Lucian (2021). The Handbook of Banking Technology. John Wiley & Sons. ISBN 9781119328018.
- Working Smarter in Tax Debt Management. OECD Publishing. 2014. ISBN 9789264223257.
- Calvert, Natalie, ed. (2017). "Glossary". Gower Handbook of Call and Contact Centre Management. Routledge. ISBN 9781351932363.
- Meikle-Small, Martin (1997). "Harnessing new technology". In Murley, Peter (ed.). Gower Handbook of Customer Service. Gower Publishing. ISBN 9780566076886.
- Business Essentials: Marketing Principles. BPP Learning Media. 2010. ISBN 9780751776645.
- Farquhar, Jillian; Meidan, Arthur (2017). Marketing Financial Services (2nd ed.). Bloomsbury Publishing. ISBN 9781349924011.
- Yarberry Jr, William A. (2002). Computer Telephony Integration (2nd ed.). CRC Press. ISBN 9781420000405.
