= National Do Not Call List =

Do not call list for residents of Canada

The National Do Not Call List (DNCL) (French: Liste nationale de numéros de télécommunication exclus) is a list administered by the Canadian Radio-television and Telecommunications Commission (CRTC) that enables residents of Canada to decide whether or not to receive telemarketing calls. It was first announced by the Government of Canada on 13 December 2004.

The DNCL has been labelled a "disaster" and over a decade after the law's creation, many telemarketers are either unaware or do not follow the rules imposed by the DNCL.

The DNCL continues to receive heavy criticism, the latest being from Senator Percy Downe who referred to it as "totally useless", due to the costly but totally ineffective enforcement, the large number of exempt groups and the ability for anyone from anywhere in the world to purchase sets of phone numbers for relatively low fees, and then abuse the Do Not Call List as a calling list. Senator Downe cited multiple examples of constituents, whom he had personally added to the list, receiving a sudden increase in telemarketing calls three months later.

On 20 April 2009, the CRTC announced that telephone and fax numbers on the list would be listed on the DNCL for five years, extended from the three years at the list's inception. Numbers are now on the list indefinitely.

== Overview ==
Legislation entitled Bill C-37, An Act to amend the Telecommunications Act, introduced in the House of Commons, was given first reading on 13 December 2004. It addressed telemarketing calls in Canada and would allow people to sign up to prevent certain telemarketers from contacting them. It received royal assent on 25 November 2005 and came into force on 30 June 2006.

The legislation gives the Canadian Radio-television and Telecommunications Commission (CRTC) authority to establish a national do not call list, to establish procedures to administer the Act and to levy penalties for violations.

Starting 30 September 2008, residents of Canada were able to register their telephone numbers on the list online, or by telephone, fax or teletype.

== Exemptions ==
The Do Not Call List exempts Canadian registered charities, political parties, riding associations, candidates, pollsters and newspapers of general circulation for the purpose of soliciting subscriptions. Telemarketing calls from organizations with whom residents have an existing business relationship are also exempt. Telemarketers may also still call if a resident gave them permission in a written form or verbally. This law also does not extend its protections to non-Canadian phone numbers.

Paragraph 41.7(4) of The Telecommunications Act requires that every exempted telemarketer "shall maintain their own do not call list and shall ensure that no telecommunication is made on their behalf to any person who has requested that they receive no telecommunication...". Unlike the DNCL Rules, the Act itself makes no provision for a grace period or expiry, so all do not call requests must be honoured immediately and permanently.

In letters dated 27 June 2008, to the Canadian Marketing Association (CMA) and the Canadian Bankers Association (CBA), CRTC Chairman Konrad von Finckenstein personally ruled that do not call requests from third parties, such as iOptOut.ca, are to be considered "...as valid requests and must be honoured." Due to its overwhelming popularity, iOptOut.ca is currently being upgraded and improved.

On 13 November 2008, the CRTC declined a request from telecommunications provider Rogers Wireless to permit Canadian wireless customers to block unsolicited SMS text messages through the DNCL.

== Timeline ==
The privacy benefits the list will achieve remain uncertain. A working group of the CRTC held hearings concerning the planned implementation of the list. It submitted recommendations on 26 July 2006.

On 3 July 2007, the CRTC announced it would be issuing a request for proposals to suppliers willing to provide this service. On 21 December 2007, the CRTC announced that it had picked Bell Canada to operate the National Do Not Call List for five years. It is funded from subscription fees paid by telemarketers, rather than relying on fees by end citizens. It became operational on 30 September 2008.

== Criticism ==
Michael Geist, professor of law at the University of Ottawa, has criticized the changes adopted in the amended Act. He observed that the legislation contained too many exemptions which would not result in a significant decrease in calls for subscribers of the DNCL. Geist expressed particular concern about the extent and duration of the existing business relationship exception. In a 2009 article for the Toronto Star, Geist labelled the CRTC's do-not-call list a "disaster" and recommended that parliament return to the original version of Bill C-37 by eliminating all exemptions. He further recommended cross-border cooperation to resolve jurisdictional issues and immediate tough enforcement to send a strong signal to violators.

In November 2008, it was reported that the CRTC had received thousands of complaints from individuals about the implementation of the Do Not Call List. People reported that they had actually experienced a notable increase in the number of calls since registering for the list, and were starting to get calls at cellular phone numbers that had never received telemarketing calls before.

However, a VoxPop study found that 80% of those registered on the DNCL had noticed a reduction in calls, while 13% had seen an increase. The study concluded that the most likely explanation for the increase was due to timing of the launch of the DNCL with the Great Recession which was affecting American and other foreign companies harder than Canadian, and where unscrupulous telemarketers that did not care about Canadian laws were using random dialers to find new business.

In January 2009, numerous media and consumer advocacy organizations reported that anyone can use false information pretending to be a telemarketer and download a set of numbers from the list for a $50 fee. It took their reporter ten minutes to do so. It has been proposed that list may be being downloaded and used as a telemarketing list overseas, where there's little that can be done as the CRTC has no jurisdiction outside of Canada. Konrad von Finckenstein, Chair of the CRTC, responded to these allegations on 16 June 2009, labeling them an urban myth, and stating that the Government had looked into the claims and that there was "no evidence to substantiate them".

=== Technological shortcomings ===
A notable shortcoming of the Canadian implementation of the do-not-call list is that the list of numbers is given to telemarketers in plain text, in the form of a simple spreadsheet or CSV file without any protection or traceability. Technologies for securing personal data are readily available, as shown by Australia's Do Not Call Register, which "is a secure database where you can list your numbers to avoid receiving unsolicited telemarketing calls and marketing faxes." In contrast to the CRTC's uncontrolled distribution of telephone number lists, the Australian system consists of a "List Washing Service", precisely as proposed by the minority opinion which was disregarded by the CRTC.

On 3 July 2007, in Telecom Decision CRTC 2007-47, the CRTC disregarded the non-consensus report from the DNCL Operations Working Group, which had strongly recommended against allowing telemarketers to download unmarked, untraceable copies of the do-not-call list. With the aim of protecting the confidentiality of cell and unlisted numbers, the non-consensus report had instead advocated a Query/Response methodology, wherein telemarketers would be able to query only the do-not-call status of numbers they already had in their possession. Although the CRTC had rejected the Query/Response methodology, citing grounds of operational cost and complexity, a one-number-at-a-time Query/Response turned out to be so operationally simple and inexpensive that it is provided by the CRTC, free of charge, without restriction, to anyone who cares to use it. Other jurisdictions such as the USA provide similar Query/Response functions to checklists of small sets of numbers simultaneously, also free of charge. Jurisdictions such as Australia protect subscriber privacy, precisely as envisioned by the minority report, by keeping the list in the form of a secure database, and providing only a "List Washing Service".

The CRTC's decision to expire registrations is regarded by citizens' rights groups as a technical shortcoming that adds unnecessary operational cost and complexity to the system, as well as limiting registrants' freedom to express their wishes. On 17 June 2008, the USA made registrations permanent until the number is disconnected or reassigned, citing "...benefits to the public and to consumer privacy interests...".

Another possibility to prevent using the plain text list as a list of people to call is to provide honeypot numbers, unique to each telemarketer. If a telemarketer, or anyone he has given the list to, then calls one of the honeypot numbers, stiff penalties can be applied to the telemarketer. If the originating number of a violating call is either foreign or disguised, the CRTC could apply the penalties to the telco which delivered the call to the subscriber's line since that telco acted as an agent of the telemarketer by delivering the call.. There is no indication from the CRTC whether honeypots have been implemented as part of the DNCL.

== See also ==
- Do Not Call Register (Australia)
- New Zealand Name Removal Service
- Telephone Preference Service (United Kingdom)
- National Do Not Call Registry (United States)
- Robinson list, a UK opt-out registry of people who do not wish to receive marketing communications

== Sources ==
- Facts about the National Do Not Call List CRTC information regarding the September 2008 launch of the National Do Not Call List
- Canada's Do Not Hesitate to Call List, Geist, 11 September 2005
- Canada's Do-Not-Hesitate-To-Call List Goes From Bad to Worse Geist, 20 October 2005
- Industry Canada announcement of 13 December 2004
- Bill C-37
- Web Site
- Notice of May 2, 2006 CRTC Hearing
- Do Not Call:Hanging Up on the Telemarketers, CBC In Depth Report, 25 November 2005
