= Telemarketing =

Method of direct marketing

Telemarketers try to sell products over the phone

Telemarketing (sometimes known as inside sales, or telesales in the UK and Ireland) is a method of direct marketing in which a salesperson solicits prospective customers to buy products, subscriptions or services, either over the phone or through a subsequent face to face or web conferencing appointment scheduled during the call. Telemarketing can also include recorded sales pitches programmed to be played over the phone via automatic dialing.

Telemarketing refers to the practice of contacting, qualifying, and soliciting prospective customers through telecommunications technologies, including telephone, fax, and internet communications. It does not encompass direct mail marketing.

== Categories ==
The two major categories of telemarketing are business-to-business and business-to-consumer.

=== Subcategories ===
- Lead generation, the gathering of information and contacts.
- Sales, using persuasion to sell a product or service.
- Outbound, proactive marketing in which prospective and preexisting customers are contacted directly,
- Inbound, reception of incoming orders and requests for information. Demand is generally created by advertising, publicity, or the efforts of outside salespeople.

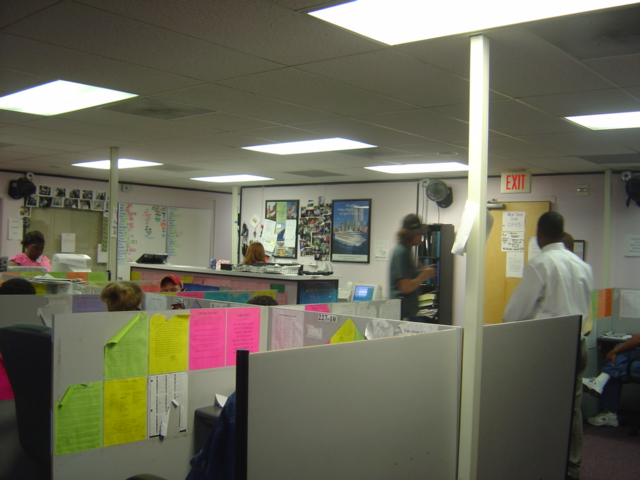
Telemarketing office

=== Service Styles ===
- Call to Action, the implementation of outbound telemarketing to "activate" or elicit an action or response from prospects (i.e., entice prospects to visit a client's website).
- Appointment Setting, utilizing inbound or outbound telemarketing to create face-to-face or telephone appointments for sales purposes.
- Database Cleansing, the outbound calling of databases with the particular purpose to clean and prepare data (i.e. removing outdated and incorrect data) and contact details for future telemarketing campaigns.
- Surveys, the implementation of telemarketing (can be inbound or outbound) with the particular purpose of collecting data and information from specific target markets for qualitative research purposes.
- Telesales, telemarketing (inbound or outbound) with the specific intention of making an actual sale/transaction over the phone. Often includes the collection of credit card details over the phone for payment purposes, which allows for faster sales cycles and payment confirmation.

== Procedure ==
Telemarketing may be done from a company office, from a call center, or from home. It may involve a live operator voice broadcasting which is most frequently associated with political messages.

An effective telemarketing campaign often involves two or more calls. The first call (or series of calls) determines the customer's needs. The final call (or series of calls) motivates the customer to make a purchase. Prospective customers are identified by various means, including past purchase history, previous requests for information, credit limit, competition entry forms, and application forms. Names may also be purchased from another company's consumer database or obtained from a telephone directory or another public list. The qualification process is intended to determine which customers are most likely to purchase the product or service.

In business-to-business lead generation scenarios, telemarketing often targets perceived decision-makers who might be good prospects for a business product or service. The telemarketing approach is often combined with outreach via email or social media, typically referred to as a cadence. Calls are usually made by sales development representatives with the goal of this outreach being a subsequent meeting—often with an account executive at the vendor organization.

Charitable organizations, alumni associations, and political parties often use telemarketing to solicit donations. Marketing research companies use telemarketing techniques to survey the prospective or past customers of a client's business to assess market acceptance of or satisfaction with a particular product, service, brand, or company. Public opinion polls are conducted similarly.

Telemarketing techniques are also applied to other forms of electronic marketing using e-mail or fax messages, in which case they are frequently considered spam by receivers.

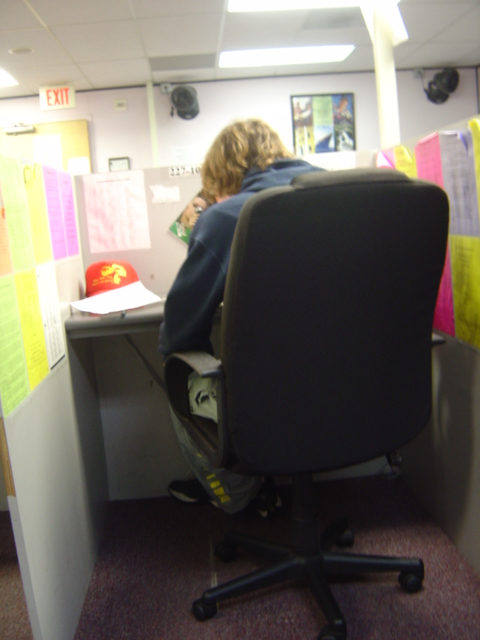
Telemarketing agent sitting in a cubicle. The brightly colored rebuttal sheets are used to answer most questions a customer might have.

== Negative perceptions and criticism ==
Telemarketing has been negatively associated with various scams and frauds, such as pyramid schemes, and with deceptively overpriced products and services. Fraudulent telemarketing companies are frequently referred to as "telemarketing boiler rooms" or simply "boiler rooms". Telemarketing is often criticized as an unethical business practice due to the perception of high-pressure sales techniques during unsolicited calls. Telemarketers marketing telephone companies may participate in telephone slamming, the practice of switching a customer's telephone service without their knowledge or authorization.

Telemarketing calls are often considered an annoyance, especially when they occur during the dinner hour, early in the morning, or late in the evening. A common complaint about telemarketing has been that the calls are a nuisance and a distraction. In 1909, one target of the unwelcome calls declared "My telephone is far more of a nuisance to me than it is a convenience". However, some companies have capitalized on these negative emotions. Since 2007 several forums have sprouted and act as complaint boards where consumers can voice their concerns and criticism. In response, some telemarketing companies have filed lawsuits against these portals. The current legal system in the U.S grants such forums a certain degree of protection through "Communications Decency Act, 47 U.S.C 230" and California's Anti-SLAPP law.

=== Robotic telemarketing and ringless voicemail ===
Telemarketing may also use robocalls: automated telephone calls that use both computerized autodialers and computer-delivered pre-recorded messages in a sales pitch. Some can simulate a personalized phone call through personalized pre-recorded messages.

Telemarketing has recently been advanced to implement a programmed women's voice as the operator instead of hiring a real woman to perform the task (see example of Samantha West). This attempt is unsuccessful. However, some scholars argue that such technological advancements reinforce commoditization of a woman's speech as a marketable entity and lead to "gendered hierarchy of communication".

Other tactics, such as ringless voicemail, can directly deliver a voice message directly to a landline's or cellphone's voicemail. Its original purpose was to provide a nonintrusive method of delivering valuable messages. There has been debate on ringless voicemail causing issues relating to "hijacking" of the voicemail by companies, which would disallow family and friends to access the voicemail.

== Regulations ==
In some countries telemarketing is subject to regulatory and legislative controls related to consumer privacy and protection.

=== United States ===
Telemarketing in the United States is governed at the federal level primarily by the Telephone Consumer Protection Act of 1991 (TCPA) (47 U.S.C. § 227) and the Federal Trade Commission's Telemarketing Sales Rule (TSR). The Federal Communications Commission (FCC) implements additional TCPA regulations under 47 C.F.R. § 64.1200 and derives further authority from the Telemarketing and Consumer Fraud and Abuse Prevention Act (15 U.S.C. §§ 6101–6108). Amendments to the TSR issued in December 2024 expanded the rule to cover certain inbound telemarketing calls related to technical-support services, effective January 9, 2025. In December 2023 the FCC adopted a "one-to-one" consent requirement for autodialed and prerecorded telemarketing calls and texts, but in January 2025, days before its scheduled effective date, the United States Court of Appeals for the Eleventh Circuit vacated the rule in Insurance Marketing Coalition v. FCC, holding that it exceeded the agency's statutory authority under the TCPA. The FCC subsequently repealed the vacated rule language. Many professional associations also maintain voluntary codes of ethics intended to promote responsible telemarketing practices.

Some jurisdictions have implemented "Do Not Call" lists through industry organizations or legislation; telemarketers are restricted from initiating contact with participating consumers. Legislative versions often provide for heavy penalties on companies which call individuals on these listings. The U.S. Federal Trade Commission has implemented a National Do Not Call Registry in an attempt to reduce intrusive telemarketing nationwide. Telemarketing corporations and trade groups challenged this as a violation of commercial speech rights. However, the U.S. 10th Circuit Court of Appeals upheld the National Do Not Call Registry on February 17, 2004.

Companies that use telemarketing as a sales tool are governed by the United States Federal regulations outlined in the TSR (amended on January 29, 2003 originally issued in 1995) and the TCPA. In addition to these Federal regulations, telemarketers calling nationally must also adhere to separate state regulations. Most states have adapted "do not call" files of their own, of which only some states share with the U.S. Federal Do Not Call registry. Each U.S. state also has its own regulations concerning: permission to record, permission to continue, no rebuttaling statutes, Sunday and Holiday calls; as well as the fines and punishments exacted for violations.

September 1, 2009, FTC regulations banning most robocalls went into effect.

Since many telemarketing calls now originate offshore, beyond the reach of US legal or regulatory agencies, the National Do Not Call Registry is usually ignored, as well as FTC regulations, and every possible number is called in an area code block. Some automated services are sophisticated enough to analyze the audio from the answering party, and if it determines that a human did not respond, will call repeatedly until one does or a limit is reached. This may be coupled with a fake Caller ID display ("spoofing") to mislead the call recipient into answering, or even thinking it is a local number calling. These are not actions of legitimate businesses.

Telemarketing techniques are increasingly used in political campaigns. Because of free-speech issues, the laws governing political phone calls are much less stringent than those applying to commercial messages. Even so, a number of states have barred or restricted political robocalls.

The National Do Not Call Registry has helped to substantially curb telemarketing calls to landlines and has also helped with the increasing trend for telemarketers to target mobile phones. As a result, there has been a greater push for mobile applications to help with unwanted calls from telemarketers, like PrivacyStar. These companies have helped to log thousands of complaints to the DNC Registry, since the inception of the registry itself.

Following the enactment of the TRACED Act in 2019, the Federal Communications Commission adopted additional rules to combat illegal robocalls, including requirements for call authentication and mitigation programs by telecommunications providers.

In 2020, the FCC mandated the implementation of the STIR/SHAKEN caller ID authentication framework to combat spoofed robocalls. Major telecommunications providers were required to implement the system by June 3, 2021, and smaller providers were required to comply by December 10, 2021.

=== Canada ===
Telemarketing in Canada is regulated by the Canadian Radio-television and Telecommunications Commission (CRTC), an agency of the federal department Innovation, Science and Economic Development Canada. Canadians can register with the National Do Not Call List (DNCL) to reduce the number of telemarketing calls received. Anyone who has received a telemarketing call which is in violation of one or more of the Unsolicited Telecommunications Rules may file a complaint to the national DNCL. The national DNCL operator then forwards all complaints to the CRTC, which determines whether a complaint warrants further investigation, based on their initial assessment.

=== Australia ===
Telemarketing in Australia is restricted by the Australian Federal Government and policed by the Australian Communications and Media Authority (ACMA). Australian Federal legislation provides for a restriction in calling hours for both Research and Marketing calls.

In 2007 a Do Not Call Register was established for Australian inbound telephone numbers. The register allows a user to register private use telephone numbers. Australian Federal Legislation limits the types of marketing calls that can be made to these registered telephone numbers; however, research calls are allowed. Other exemptions include calls made by charities and political members, parties and candidates, however, any organisation that is instructed by the recipient of a telemarketing call to not call that number again, is legally obliged to comply, and must remove the phone number from the organisations calling list(s).

Inbound telemarketing is another major industry. It involves both live operators and IVR—Interactive Voice Response. IVR is also known as audio text or automated call processing. Usually, major television campaigns and advertisers use toll-free telephone number that are answered by IVR service bureaus. Such service bureaus have the technology and call capacity to process the large amounts of simultaneous calls that occur when a toll-free telephone number is advertised on television.

=== England/UK ===
British police, after noting the high rate of pensioners affected, recommended use of do-not-call registry enrollment to enhance "phone security." Specific mention was also made of calls from "overseas companies."

==== Restrictions ====
Telemarketing restrictions in the UK are in place to protect consumers from unwanted and intrusive marketing calls. The use of predictive dialers, which are computer programs that dial telephone numbers automatically and connect the calls to an available agent, can make compliance with these restrictions more challenging. The Information Commissioner's Office (ICO), the UK's independent regulator for data protection and privacy, has issued guidelines on the use of predictive dialers for telemarketing, which require explicit consent from individuals, clear information about the purpose of the call and the business making the call, an option for individuals to opt-out of future calls, and an accurate and up-to-date call list. Additionally, businesses must ensure that their predictive dialer does not generate abandoned calls at a rate higher than 3% of live calls and must comply with the General Data Protection Regulation (GDPR) when processing personal data for marketing purposes. Failure to comply with these regulations can result in severe penalties, including fines and damage to a business's reputation.

=== Finland ===
In Finland, call centers employ an estimated 100,000 people, but most work with customer relations in larger companies. 10,000 people are working for companies involved with telemarketing. Telemarketing often is the first job young people get. But it is also a way out or back to the labour market for handicapped, immigrants and pensioners, In Finland, the profession has had a bad reputation because of work-related injuries. The strain on neck, shoulders, eyes and ears can be considerable. Health problems have however been reduced considerably thanks to lightweight headsets, ergonomic working stations and more tasks, like documentation, done automatically by computers.

=== France ===
The ability to cause a French phone number to appear on a Caller ID display, when the call originates outside of France was removed by a law passed in July 2018. Implementation was delayed until August 1 of the following year. France restricted permitted cold-calling hours in 2022, banning marketing calls at weekends and on public holidays. A law of 30 June 2025 went further: from 11 August 2026, telephone canvassing of consumers is prohibited unless they have given prior, explicit and revocable consent, replacing the opt-out system based on the Bloctel do-not-call register with an opt-in regime. In June 2026, France's Constitutional Council struck down provisions that would have allowed several regulators to impose penalties for the same telemarketing offence, while the ban itself remained due to take effect as scheduled.

== History ==
The term telemarketing was first used extensively in the late 1970s to describe Bell System communications which related to new uses for the outbound WATS and inbound Toll-free services. However, the practice of contacting potential customers by telephone originated in the late 19th century.

A 1903 report documented using the telephone for local marketing by a dry goods store, which reported that it was more effective than "sending clerks or errand boys" to inform potential clients about buying opportunities. In 1909, a department store's "general solicitation", made by telephone to over 1,000 prospective customers, promoted "a carnival of values... an offering of exceptional qualities at prices we have never before been able to make". A year later, an electric power company's practice of calling potential customers at home, noted that "Regarding time of calling it is suggested that between 8 and 9 is preferable, owing to the fact that the head of the house is generally in at that time and a sufficient length of time has elapsed after the evening meal". By 1912, the practice was established to the degree that a reviewer outlined fourteen specific ideas for soliciting and securing orders by telephone. Telephone solicitation also developed political uses, including in 1908 "get out the vote" calls, and recorded political speeches played for prospective voters.

=== Telephonists ===
Telephonists, or switchboard operators, were a trans-cultural hiring of switchboard operators (mostly women) which became especially popular in North America throughout the 20th century, partially due to popularity gained through advertising. After the shift from public switched telephone network to computer-based electronic switching system, the job of switchboard operators gradually diminished. However, with the rise of advertising and with the popularity of the telephone use, new jobs, including telemarketing jobs, were created.

=== Women in telemarketing ===
Telemarketing, as was the case with telephone operators, is one of the fields known to be occupied mostly by women. The central reason for hiring women operators lay in the fact that women's work was considered a form of cheap labor: female telemarketers earned about one-half to one-quarter of men's wages. Women were also considered as more polite and well mannered than male operators. Moreover, the calming, more delicate nature of a woman's voice was considered to be women's natural quality, although no scientific evidence supports this statement. This naturalization led to normalizing the perception of women as telephone operators and consultants, which is currently reflected in the telemarketing industry.

== Technology ==
- Agent-assisted automation
- Autodialer
- Automatic call distributor
- Customer relationship management
- Predictive dialer
- Private Branch eXchange
- Teleblock
- Natural predictive dialing
- Ringless voicemail

== See also ==
- Boiler room (business)
- Call centre
- Cold calling
- Direct marketing
- List of call centre companies
- Marketing
- Reloading scam
- Spamming
- Sucker list
- Nuisance call
