= Win–loss =

Win–loss may refer to:

- Win–loss analytics, analysis of the reasons why a visitor to a website was or wasn't persuaded to engage in a desired action
- Win–loss record, also winning percentage
- Win–loss record (pitching), the number of wins and losses a pitcher has accumulated either in his career or a single season

== See also ==
- Wins & Losses
- Win, Lose or Draw (disambiguation)
- Win or Lose (disambiguation)
- Win win (disambiguation)
- Zero-sum game
