= Landing page =

Type of web page

In online marketing, a landing page, sometimes known as a "lead capture page", "single property page", "static page", "squeeze page" or a "destination page", is a single web page that appears in response to clicking on a search engine optimized search result, marketing promotion, marketing email or an online advertisement. The landing page will usually display directed sales copy that is a logical extension of the advertisement, search result or link. Landing pages are used for lead generation. The actions that a visitor takes on a landing page are what determine an advertiser's conversion rate. A landing page may be part of a microsite or a single page within an organization's main web site.

Landing pages are often linked to social media, e-mail campaigns, search engine marketing campaigns, high-quality articles or "affiliate account" in order to enhance the effectiveness of the advertisements. The general goal of a landing page is to convert site visitors into sales or leads. If the goal is to obtain a lead, the landing page will include some method for the visitor to get into contact with the company, usually a phone number or an inquiry form. If a sale is required, the landing page will usually have a link for the visitor to click, which will then send them to a shopping cart or a checkout area. By analyzing activity generated by the linked URL, marketers can use click-through rates and conversion rate to determine the success of an advertisement.

== Types ==
There are two types of landing pages: reference and transactional.

=== Reference ===
A reference landing page presents information that is relevant to the visitor. These can display text, images, dynamic compilations of relevant links or other elements. The idea is to isolate the visitor in this landing page from any other distractions, like full website menu or "similar products", and surround the visitor with all available information about the targeted product to convince them to take action and get captured.

The "References" landing page type should be a transitional stage before the second type which is the "Transactional" type.

=== Transactional ===
The purpose of the transactional landing page is to persuade a visitor to take action by completing a transaction. This is accomplished by providing a form that needs to be filled out. The visitor information is obtained in order to add the visitor's email address to a mailing list as a prospect. An email campaign can then be developed based on responses to transactional landing pages. The goal is to capture as much information about the visitor as possible. The ultimate goal is to convert the visitor into a customer.

== Origin and evolution ==
Landing pages originated with the IT departments of Microsoft in late 2003 in response to poor online sales of Office. The process was tedious and time-consuming. The rise of cloud computing and e-commerce around 2009 provided ideal conditions for these startups to flourish. Since then the customer requirements changed, requesting integrations with other solutions such as email marketing, lead nurturing and customer relationship management systems.

=== Typical format ===
Landing pages typically feature clear, concise, action-oriented headlines. An effective landing page explains the product or offering in a straightforward way, while placing visual emphasis on its key value and benefits.

Marketing experts recommend websites remove the navigation menu and limit internal and external links on the page. Any signup forms on the landing page should reflect the value of the offer. For example, a free offer or newsletter sign up form may only request an email address, whereas high-value offers may have longer forms with more details required. They may also include a relevant image, animation or short video. These pages also tend to contain small icons (e.g. of Facebook or Twitter) to facilitate social media sharing.

=== Smart links ===
With the proliferation of competing social media and music distribution platforms a minimal landing page referred to as a smart link has appeared. These are a short url, typically shared to existing fans, which leads to a landing page which only has links to the same content on multiple different platforms – enabling customers to choose where they complete their transaction.

== Optimization ==
Landing page optimization (LPO) is one part of a broader Internet marketing process called conversion optimization or conversion rate optimization (CRO), with the goal of improving the percentage of visitors to the website that become sales leads and customers. A landing page is a webpage that is displayed when a potential customer clicks an advertisement or a search engine result link. This webpage typically displays content that is a relevant extension of the advertisement or link. LPO aims to provide page content and appearance that makes the webpage more appealing to target audiences.

There are three major types of LPO based on targeting:

1. Associative content targeting (also called rule-based optimization or passive targeting). The page content is modified based on information obtained about the visitor's search criteria, geographic information of source traffic or other known generic parameters that can be used for explicit non-research-based consumer segmentation.
2. Predictive content targeting (also called active targeting). The page content is adjusted by correlating any known information about the visitor (e.g., prior purchase behavior, personal demographic information, browsing patterns, etc.) to anticipate (desired) future actions based on predictive analytics.
3. Consumer directed targeting (also called social targeting). The page content is created using the relevance of publicly available information through a mechanism based on reviews, ratings, tagging, referrals, etc.

There are two major types of LPO based on experimentation:

1. Closed-ended experimentation. Consumers are exposed to several variations of landing pages, altering elements like headlines, formatting and layout while their behavior is observed in an attempt to remove distractions that will take the lead away from the page, including the primary navigation. At the conclusion of the experiment, an optimal page is selected based on the outcome of the experiment.
2. Open-ended experimentation. This approach is similar to closed-ended experimentation except that more variations will be added for testing and experimentation will not stop when a winner is found. This method is used by large corporations to dynamically improve their conversion rates and improve user experience. Landing pages can also be adjusted dynamically as the experiment results change to further enhance user experience.

=== Experimentation-based ===
Experimentation-based LPO can be achieved using A/B testing, multivariate LPO and total-experience testing. These methodologies are applicable to both closed- and open-ended experimentation.

==== A/B testing ====
A/B testing, or A/B split testing, is a method for testing two versions of a webpage: version "A" and version "B". The goal is to test multiple versions of webpages (e.g. home page, product page or FAQ) or one specific element that changes between variation A and variation B (such as having a lead form on the left-hand side or having it placed on the right-hand side), to determine which version is most appealing/effective. This testing method may also be known as A/B/n split testing; the n denoting more than 2 tests being measured and compared. The data for A/B testing is usually measured via click-through rate or an alternative conversion tracking method.

Testing can be conducted sequentially or in parallel. In sequential testing, often the easiest to implement, the various versions of the webpages are made available online for a specified time period. In parallel (split) testing, both versions are made available and the traffic is divided between the two. The results of sequential split testing can be skewed by differing time periods and traffic patterns in which the different tests are run.

A/B testing has the following advantages:

- Inexpensive because existing resources and tools are used.
- Simple because no complex statistical analysis is required.

A/B testing has the following disadvantages:

- Difficult to control all external factors (e.g., campaigns, search traffic, press releases, seasonality) when using sequential testing.
- Very limited in that reliable conclusions cannot be drawn for pages that contain multiple elements that vary in each version.

==== Multivariate testing ====
Multivariate landing page optimization (MVLPO) accounts for multiple variations of visual elements (e.g., graphics, text) on a page. For example, a given page may have k choices for the title, m choices for the featured image or graphic and n choices for the company logo. This example yields k×m×n landing page configurations.

Significant improvements can be seen through testing different copy text, form layouts, landing page images and background colours. However, not all elements produce the same improvements in conversions and by looking at the results from different tests, it is possible to identify the elements that consistently tend to produce the greatest increase in conversions.

The first application of experimental design for MVLPO was performed by Moskowitz Jacobs Inc. in 1998 as a simulation/demonstration project for Lego. MVLPO did not become a mainstream approach until 2003 or 2004.

MVLPO has the following advantages:

- Provides a reliable, scientifically based approach for understanding customers' preferences and optimizing their experience.
- Has evolved to be an easy-to-use approach in which not much IT involvement is required. In many cases, a few lines of JavaScript allow remote vendor servers to control changes, collect data and analyze the results.
- Provides a foundation for open-ended experimentation.

MVLPO has the following disadvantages:

- As with any quantitative consumer research, there is a danger of GIGO (garbage in, garbage out). Ideas that are sourced from known customer touchpoints or strategic business objectives are needed to obtain optimal results.
- Focuses on optimizing one page at a time. Website experiences for most sites involve multiple pages, which are typically complex. For an e-commerce website, it is typical for a successful purchase to involve between twelve and eighteen pages; for a support site, even more pages are often required.

==== Total-experience testing ====
Total-experience testing, or experience testing, is a type of experiment-based testing in which the entire website experience of the visitor is examined using technical capabilities of the website platform (e.g., ATG, Blue Martini Software, etc.). Rather than creating multiple websites, total-experience testing uses the website platform to create several persistent experiences and monitors which one is preferred by the customers.

An advantage of total-experience testing is that it reflects the customer's total website experience, not just the experience with a single page. Two disadvantages are that total-experience testing requires a website platform that supports experience testing, and it takes longer to obtain results than A/B testing and MVLPO.

==== "F-like" layout ====
Various eye-tracking tools have proven that people scan webpages in various patterns, but one of the most common for both desktop and mobile takes the form of a letter "F". In this pattern, most website visitors see the top and left side of the screen first and only then move to other parts of the screen, line by line. As a result, web developers include the most important website content in the first lines and first words of the text to improve visitors' understanding and impression of overall content.

==== Message matching ====
Message matching is the idea of matching the pre-click message to the post-click message on the landing page. The goal of message matching is to create a landing page that directs individuals to a page on a product or subject they are expecting.

This could be done by displaying a statement to the visitors using the same keywords and the right images on the landing page that was found in the advertisement they clicked on.

The messaging on the page reinforces the reason for their click, reducing or removing confusion and therefore increasing conversion rates. This improves overall user experience and reduces the bounce rate (individuals leaving the site without converting or navigating to another portion of the site) for the page. Good message matching can increase conversion by up to 50% in many cases.

==== Design matching ====
Design matching takes the design on the display ad and repeats it on the landing page. This keeps the look, feel and sentiment consistent, smoothing the transition between clicking the ad and completing a conversion.

== See also ==
- Conversion path – Route a user takes through a website to their goal
- Home page – Main page of a website
- Marketing brochure – Flyer, pamphlet, or leaflet that is used to pass information about something
- Multivariate testing in marketing – Test a component of a marketing campaign
- Multivariate landing page optimization – Test variations of web page elements to find the best one
- Online marketing – Form of advertising that uses the Internet
- Pay-per-click – Internet advertising model
- Search engine marketing – Form of internet marketing
- Social media optimization – Form of optimization
- Splash screen – User interface element
