= Lead validation =

Lead validation is the process by which sales leads generated by internet marketing campaigns are separated from other types of conversions. Lead validation is crucial for effective internet marketing management; without it, companies can neither accurately evaluate the results of, nor efficiently improve, their SEO, PPC, display advertising, email, content marketing and social media campaigns.

== Definitions ==
Three other terms are particularly important to any discussion of lead validation:

1. Conversion. A conversion (also referred to as an inquiry) is a response to an Internet marketing campaign, such as an online form being submitted, content being downloaded, or a phone call being placed. A conversion is not the same as a sales lead. A conversion could be a prospect inquiring about a company's products or services — but it could also be a customer lodging a complaint, a sales solicitation or some other non-sales related communication.
2. Conversion Rate. The conversion rate of an Internet marketing campaign is the number of website visitors who complete a desired action, divided by the total number of visitors. For example, if 10,000 visitors come to a PPC landing page and 500 submit the page's inquiry form, the conversion rate is 5 percent.
3. Validated Conversion Rate. The validated conversion rate is the net conversion rate after the lead validation process has removed non-sales lead inquires. So, returning to the example above (see Conversion Rate), if 10,000 visitors come to a PPC landing page, 500 submit the page's inquiry form, and 300 of those are true sales leads, the validated conversion rate of the campaign is 3 percent.

In the examples cited above, the importance of lead validation becomes clear: Without lead validation, the PPC advertiser will assume it has received 200 leads (500 inquiries versus 300 validated leads) that do not, in fact, exist. This serious flaw in analytics causes several marketing- and business-related problems.

== Methods of Generating Leads Online ==
Companies have several options for online lead generation, each with its own campaign structures, metrics, and best practices. The most important and typically most effective options are as follows:

- SEO (Search engine optimization) focuses on making a company's online content as visible as possible in organic search results on platforms like Google and Bing for queries related to its products and services. Since Google withholds organic keyword data from webmasters, accurate conversion analysis has become increasingly important in structuring SEO campaign tracking, as it provides more meaningful insights than ranking data alone.
- PPC (Pay-per-click advertising) aims to display advertisements prominently on search engines for queries relevant to a company's offerings. Many PPC campaigns are primarily or entirely focused on immediate lead generation, which makes the collection of accurate conversion data essential for assessing performance.
- Display advertising seeks to present ads on web pages either based on users' past behavior or on websites with audiences relevant to the advertiser. Common forms include retargeting, contextual targeting, and site targeting. Display campaigns may target short-term lead generation, longer-term brand-building objectives, or a combination of both.
- Email marketing is used in various ways to reach new customers and strengthen relationships with existing ones. Consumer-focused businesses often use email content for direct lead generation, while B2B companies also rely on it for purposes such as sharing information and establishing credibility.
- Content marketing involves the publication and distribution of content online (and sometimes offline) with the primary goal of lead generation. It is frequently used to build a house mailing list by offering high-quality downloadable content as a secondary offer. In many cases, content marketing also supports indirect lead generation by publishing valuable material without a direct call to action, with the expectation that its usefulness will attract prospects and referrals over time.
- Social media marketing includes a company's active engagement on one or more social media platforms. While objectives can vary and do not always include lead generation, social media can be highly effective in that area when the company's audience is large enough, properly targeted, and actively engaged.

Other types of non-sales lead inquiries include the following:

- Customer service. Current customers phoning or submitting a form for customer service support regarding a product, service, billing, etc.
- General business. Phone calls or form submissions from a company's vendors and stakeholders, communications from government agencies, inquiries from journalists, etc.
- Peer-to-peer. Internal communications, networking requests from competitors or complementary product/service providers, etc.
- Personal. Phone calls and form submissions of a personal nature
- Sales solicitation. Existing or potential vendors using phone calls and form submissions to pitch services
- Spam. Automated or semi-automated form submissions or phone calls with or without a legitimate business intent
