= Google Attribution =

Monitoring program developed by Alphabet Inc

Google Attribution is a monitoring program developed by Internet advertising company Alphabet Inc. launched in 2017. It has to link with a Google Analytics view that is associated with a registered AdWords or DoubleClick Search account. An attribution model is set of rules, that shows how credit for sales and conversions are allocated to touchpoints in conversion paths. For example, the Last Interaction model in Analytics assigns 100% credit to final touchpoints (i.e., clicks), that immediately precede sales or conversion. In contrast, the First Interaction model assigns 100% credit to touchpoints, that initiate conversion paths. In 2023, Google deprecated four rules-based attribution models — first-click, linear, time decay and position-based — from both Google Ads and Google Analytics, replacing them with data-driven attribution as the default model.
