= Black Lapel =

American custom clothing company

BL Custom, LLC dba Black Lapel Custom Suits
- Industry: Menswear & Apparel
- Founder: Derek Tian; Warren Liao
- Headquarters: Salt Lake City, UT
- Number of locations: 3 Showrooms (2024)
- Key people: Hayden Bryant (Owner); Daniel McConkie (Owner)
- Parent: MCC Apparel

Black Lapel is a menswear-focused custom clothing company founded in 2012 by Derek Tian and Warren Liao. Black Lapel was founded with the intention to make custom clothing accessible and available online as well as provide style advice and guides on workplace etiquitte, dating, and other lifestyle topics.

While the original founders began their careers in finance, Tian and Liao found that options for suiting that were appropriate for their profession weren't satisfying all of their needs—notably, finding something that fit properly at an affordable price. As a result, their desire to fix their own pain points when shopping for suiting led them to create the Black Lapel brand. The pair started their business venture with less than $400,000 in seed money.

The company started their customer acquisition strategy by focusing heavily on a content creation and amassed a loyal following through their Style Journal. By also creating a loyalty program for when clients finally made their first purchase. Black Lapel typically sees repeat client business deals with over 70% of their customer base.

In order to successfully offer custom suiting online using customer provided measurements, the team developed a proprietary sizing algorithm that could correct user error and vastly reduce return and remake rates. In fact, by 2018, the business had refined the algorithm enough that they were able to reduce return rates below 2% in an industry where typical return rates hover between 20 and 30%.

The company has also explored selling accessories and other merchandise, including collaborations with handmade shoemaker Quero as well as Stuart & Lau to offer bags and briefcases designed in tandem.

While initially focused on online sales, the company opened a showroom in New York City in 2016. The showroom closed shortly before COVID on March, 17th 2020, but was reopened in a new location in 2022. Despite production being based out of Shanghai, the website was able to continue operating and offering custom suiting throughout COVID, though often with extended lead times.

Black Lapel recently merged with fellow menswear brands Blank Label and Ratio Clothing, but will continue to operate under the Black Lapel name. The new group of brands is owned by a US-based manufacturing company which seeks to improve the brands reach through this strategic alliance. Through this partnership, the company also launched a new showroom for both Black Lapel and Ratio Clothing in 2024 in Denver, Colorado
