= Gordon v. Virtumundo, Inc. =

2009 US court case

- Court: United States Court of Appeals for the Ninth Circuit
- Full case name: Gordon v. Virtumundo, Inc.
- Decided: August 6, 2009
- Citation: 575 F.3d 1040

Case history
- Prior actions: Gordon v. Virumundo, Inc., No. 06-0204-JCC, 2007 WL 1459395 (W. D. Wash. May 15, 2007)
- Appealed from: United States District Court for the Western District of Washington
- Appealed to: United States Court of Appeals for the Ninth Circuit

Holding
- The Ninth Circuit affirmed the lower court's dismissal of plaintiff's complaint for lack of standing.

Court membership
- Judges sitting: Ronald Gould, Richard Tallman, and Consuelo Callahan

Case opinions
- Decision by: Richard Tallman

Keywords
- CAN-SPAM Act of 2003, spam

Gordon v. Virtumundo, Inc., 575 F.3d 1040, is a 2009 court opinion in which the United States Court of Appeals for the Ninth Circuit addressed the standing requirements necessary for private plaintiffs to bring suit under the Controlling the Assault of Non-Solicited Pornography and Marketing Act of 2003, or CAN-SPAM Act of 2003, 15 U.S.C. ch. 103, as well as the scope of the CAN-SPAM Act's federal preemption. Prior to this case, the CAN-SPAM Act's standing requirements had not been addressed at the Court of Appeals level, and only the Fourth Circuit had addressed the CAN-SPAM Act's preemptive scope.

== Background ==
James S. Gordon, Jr. ("Gordon"), was the manager and sole member of Omni Innovations, LLC ("Omni"), a self-described "spam-business". Omni's business model consisted of bringing suit against entities sending unsolicited commercial email, or spam, under various anti-spam statutes and then profiting from either settlement agreements or statutory damage awards.

=== An End to Spam ===
To set up his spam-suit business, Gordon, through Omni, leased server space from GoDaddy, a domain registrar and web hosting company. He then used the server space to host his own domain name, gordonworks.com, and to create email addresses for himself and several friends and family members using his domain name.

Gordon registered the gordonworks.com email addresses for online promotions, eventually joining between 100 and 150 email mailing lists. As a result, the accounts received thousands of spam emails. Gordon took control of the accounts, instructing his friends and family to create their own domain names and new email addresses on Omni's server space. He then configured the old gordonworks.com addresses to respond to commercial emails with an automated message - a "contract" by which senders agreed to stop sending spam or pay $500 for each new piece of unsolicited commercial email.

In 2004, after the spam did not stop, Gordon and Omni began to sue the companies that had sent spam to the email addresses on Omni's server space. Omni generated no revenue except for settlement agreements in these spam-related lawsuits.

== Procedure ==
Virtumundo, Inc. and Adknowledge, Inc. were internet marketing companies that had sent spam to Omni-hosted accounts. In 2006, Gordon and Omni sued Virtumundo, Inc., Adknowledge, Inc., and Scott Lynn, the sole shareholder of both companies (collectively, "Virtumundo"), in the United States District Court for the Western District of Washington, alleging violations of the federal CAN-SPAM Act and related Washington state law claims.

Gordon and Omni argued that Virtumundo's emails violated the CAN-SPAM Act because they contained misleading headers, and Section 7704 of the CAN-SPAM Act prohibits "header information that is materially false or materially misleading." Gordon and Omni also claimed that the headers violated the Washington Commercial Electronic Mail Act ("CEMA"), Wash. Rev. Code § 19.190.010 et seq., which prohibits commercial emails that "misrepresent[] or obscure[] any information in identifying the point of origin or the transmission path of a commercial electronic message". Finally, Gordon and Omni claimed that the emails constituted "unfair or deceptive acts or practices in the conduct of ... commerce" in violation of the Washington Consumer Protection Act ("CPA"), Wash. Rev. Code. § 19.86.020, and that they violated the Washington "Prize Statute", Wash. Rev. Code. § 19.170.010 et seq. In terms of relief, Gordon and Omni sought only statutory damages, as opposed to damages based on actual harm.

The District Court dismissed Gordon and Omni's Washington Prize Statute claims due to pleading deficiencies. Virtumundo then moved for summary judgment on Gordon and Omni's remaining CAN-SPAM Act, Washington CEMA, and Washington CPA claims. The District Court ruled in favor of Virtumundo, holding that Gordon and Omni lacked standing to bring an action under the CAN-SPAM Act and that the federal CAN-SPAM Act preempted their CEMA and CPA claims. Gordon and Omni appealed the summary judgment ruling to the Ninth Circuit.

== Timeline ==
Presented below is a rough outline of the major events during the legal proceedings (table adapted from).

Date	Event
September 2003	Gordon creates additional e-mail addresses on gordonworks.com
4th quarter of 2003	Gordon begins to sign-up for mailing lists.
January 1, 2004	CAN-SPAM Act becomes law.
2004	Gordon begins filling lawsuits over spam.
February 2006	Gordon files lawsuit against Virtumundo. Claims "approximately 13,800 materially misleading or otherwise unlawful e-mail messages".
December 2006	Virtumundo's motion to dismiss for pleading deficiencies is granted in part and denied in part.
January 2007	Gordon's e-mail addresses are still active at the beginning of the deposition.
May 15, 2007	Virtumundo granted summary judgement. Gordon was found to have sufficient standing to use a private action under CAN-SPAM.
June 2007	Gordon appeals summary judgement.
December 2008	Appeal begins in the US Court of Appeals for the Ninth Circuit
August 2009	Judge Tallman releases ruling on appeal. Gordon found to lack sufficient standing under CAN-SPAM as he was not an ISP and did not incur sufficient damages.

== Issues ==
1. Did Gordon and Omni have standing to bring a CAN-SPAM action?
2. Did the CAN-SPAM Act pre-empt Gordon and Omni's state law claims?

== Holding ==
The appeals court found Gordon and Omni did not have standing to sue under the CAN-SPAM act because :

1. Omni was not an "Internet Access Service" provider.
2. Omni had not been "adversely affected" by the spam.

== Discussion of the holding ==
=== Was Omni an internet service provider under the CAN-SPAM act? ===
The CAN-SPAM Act primarily provides for government actors (the Federal Trade Commission and state attorneys general) to enforce its provisions, however Section 7706(g) of the Act creates a limited private cause of action for "provider[s] of Internet access service adversely affected by a violation of" the act. To address the standing issue, the Court of Appeals therefore needed to assess whether Omni was an Internet Access Service ("IAS") provider, and (2) whether it had been "adversely affected" within the meaning of the statute.

The court first addressed the issue of whether or not Omni was an IAS provider. Section 7702 of the CAN-SPAM Act defines "Internet access service" by reference to 47 U.S.C. § 231, which states:

The term "Internet access service" means a service that enables users to access content, information, electronic mail, or other services offered over the Internet, and may also include access to proprietary content, information, and other services as part of a package of services offered to consumers. Such term does not include telecommunications services.

— 47 U.S.C. § 231

To interpret this definition, the court first attempted to determine Congress's intent, and it concluded that Congress had intended the private cause of action to be very narrowly construed. The court noted that Congress could not have contemplated the complete eradication of spam through broad private action because the text of the CAN-SPAM Act explicitly recognizes that "[e]lectronic mail has become an extremely important and popular means of communication". Although the court held that the definition of IAS provider was not limited to traditional internet service providers (ISP), providing email accounts alone, as Gordon and Omni had done, was not sufficient to satisfy the statutory definition. The court declined to state exactly what more would be needed, but it noted that GoDaddy.com - which retained physical control over the server hardware - and Verizon - the internet service provider that enabled Gordon's access to the internet - would "have a compelling argument that they are IAS providers."

In addition, the legislative history indicated that Congress only intended the private cause of action to extend to "bona fide IAS providers" suffering spam-related network slowdowns or other technical difficulties as opposed to opportunistic plaintiffs suing to profit from awards of statutory damages.

=== Did Virtumundo's spam adversely affect Omni? ===
The court went on to address whether or not Omni had been "adversely affected" by Virtumundo's spam. Although the CAN-SPAM Act does not specify the meaning of "adversely affected", the court held that the statute required "network crashes, higher bandwidth utilization, and increased costs for hardware and software upgrades, network expansion and additional personnel"; in other words, harms that might be experienced by typical internet service providers, not the mere inconvenience of ordinary email consumers. Since Omni had not experienced any of these problems, and had actually profited from the spam through lawsuit settlements, it had not been "adversely affected".

=== Did CAN-SPAM Act preempted Omni's state law claims? ===
Next, the court addressed whether Gordon and Omni's remaining state law claims were preempted by the CAN-SPAM Act's express preemption clause, contained within 15 U.S.C. § 7707(b):

This chapter supersedes any statute, regulation, or rule of a state or political subdivision of a State that expressly regulates the use of electronic mail to send commercial messages, except to the extent that any such statute, regulation, or rule prohibits falsity or deception in any portion of a commercial electronic mail message attached thereto.

— 15 U.S.C. § 7707(b)

Pursuant to this clause, the CAN-SPAM Act preempts any state regulation of commercial electronic messages, "except to the extent that any statute ... prohibits falsity or deception." The question before the Court of Appeals was the scope of this exception. The court looked first to the dictionary definitions of "deception" and "falsity", and found that deception could easily be defined as referring to "something more than immaterial inaccuracies or inadvertent mistakes"; in other words material misrepresentation or fraud. However, the definition of falsity was ambiguous.

To interpret the term "falsity", the court again looked to the CAN-SPAM Act's text and legislative history to determine Congressional intent. The legislative history indicated that Congress had intended the CAN-SPAM Act to be the national standard for the regulation of commercial email in order to spare businesses from having to deal with different standards in the fifty states. In addition, the language immediately following the preemption clause provides that the CAN-SPAM Act does not preempt "(A) State laws that are not specific to electronic mail, including State trespass, contract, or tort law; or (B) other State laws to the extent that those laws relate to acts of fraud or computer crime."

From these facts, the court concluded that Congress intended for the "falsity" and "deception" exception to be read narrowly. States should be allowed to "extend traditional tort theories such as claims arising from fraud or deception to commercial e-mail communication", but no more. Thus state law claims based on immaterial misrepresentations would be preempted by the CAN-SPAM Act, though a state law claim of fraud would survive. Applying this to Gordon and Omni's case, the court concluded that Gordon and Omni's Washington CEMA and Washington CPA claims were preempted because Gordon and Omni had not alleged facts that rose to the level of "falsity or deception" within the meaning of the CAN-SPAM Act.

== Concurrence ==
Judge Gould wrote a concurring opinion in which he agreed with the main opinion, but would have held that Gordon lacked standing solely because he was suing for profit as opposed to seeking recovery for injury. Judge Gould distinguished the CAN-SPAM Act's limited private cause of action from anti-discrimination statutes, such as the Americans with Disabilities Act, in which Congress included broad private causes of action and statutory damages provisions to encourage citizens to "test" for discrimination.

== Implications ==
The failure Gordon's use of technical infractions of the CAN-SPAM set a precedent for future anti-spam cases. Judge Tallman did not find Gordon's use technical infractions of the CAN-SPAM convincing; therefore, individuals fighting spam will be unable to claim ISP status for their legal basis. In addition, the holding also diminished the importance of state anti-spam laws given the preemption of the federal CAN-SPAM law.

== Subsequent Cases ==
Asis Internet Services v. Azoogle.com: The United States Court of Appeals for the Ninth Circuit dismissed claims under the CAN-SPAM Act for lack of standing where the plaintiff claimed that the cost of implementing spam-filtering programs constituted "adverse effects." The court held that "such ordinary filtering costs do not constitute a harm," and that "the mere cost of carrying SPAM emails over Plaintiff's facilities does not constitute a harm as required by the statute."

Asis Internet Services v. Subscriberbase: The United States District Court for the Northern District of California held that the CAN-SPAM Act did not pre-empt California's anti-spam statute, California Business & Professions Code § 17529.5, where the plaintiff based its claims on deceptive email headers. The court did not require the plaintiff to plead all the elements of common law fraud - specifically, reliance and damages - to escape preemption, although the court noted that district courts in California had previously been split on the issue.

Hypertouch, Inc. v. Valueclick, Inc.: The California Court of Appeal also held that a plaintiff asserting claims under California Business & Professions Code § 17529.5 was not required to establish reliance and damages to escape preemption by the CAN-SPAM Act.

Melaleuca, Inc. v. Hansen: The United States District Court for the District of Idaho held that the owner of a domain name lacked standing to sue under the CAN-SPAM Act where, similar to Omni, (1) it provided email and internet access through a third party internet service provider, and (2) failed to allege harms rising above routine business expenses. The defendant in this case had emailed the plaintiff's employees encouraging them to join the defendant's company (as opposed to the plaintiff corporation). Plaintiff later attempted to sue the same defendant on the same claims; the court held the new action was barred by the doctrine of collateral estoppel.
