= Melaleuca (disambiguation) =

Melaleuca is a plant genus in the family Myrtaceae containing the paperbarks.

Melaleuca may also refer to:

== Places ==
- Melaleuca, Tasmania, south west Tasmania, Australia
  - Melaleuca to Birchs Inlet Important Bird Area
- Melaleuca, Western Australia
- Melaleuca Field, minor league ballpark, Idaho, USA
- Melaleuca Women's Prison, a maximum security prison in Western Australia

== Company ==
- Melaleuca, Inc, a company headed by Frank L. VanderSloot
  - Melaleuca, Inc. v. Hansen, a lawsuit about unsolicited e-mail sent to the company

== See also ==
- Melanoleuca, a genus of fungi formerly known as Melaleuca
