= Audience screen =

Media planning is a science and one that has seen growth and increased discipline over the last few years through the introduction of new technology. These technologies have morphed from audience segmentation to audience profiling, but the most recent wave of technology to affect media planning is based on Audience Screening, which can be defined as the opportunity to purchase an actual audience online rather than impressions.

== Purpose ==
Audience Screening incorporates a number of different technologies including behavioral targeting and the more advanced Conversion optimization platforms. Audience Screening allows the advertiser to identify the audience represented from an impression on a network or a portal and determine if that audience member is more or less likely to act in response to an advertisement than the general audience. If the audience member is regarded as highly desirable, then the advertisements are exposed. If the audience member is not deemed highly desirable, then they are not exposed to the advertisement and the next sequential audience member is evaluated for desirability and match to the potential customer base for the advertiser. This process happens in fractions of a second and can be used to better qualify the audience, allowing advertisers to reach only those folks most likely to convert as well as the publisher to generate a higher cost basis for their inventory.

== How it works ==
The technology behind Audience Screening is not new, but it does represent the evolution of traditional behavioral targeting. Behavioral targeting allows the publisher to identify and bucket groups of impressions together based on the audience profile and past traffic experience. Once an advertiser identifies the audience they are looking to reach, publishers can sell this inventory accurately. The problem with this model is that it is not as fluid and flexible as the web appears to be. The experiences and the profiles of the audience change quickly and are reactive to the environment around them, so the past behavior of an audience, though relatively accurate, is still flawed. The Audience Screen model actually identifies this information in real time and can be updated faster and with more detailed accuracy. Audience Screening takes into account audience profile data, preferably in conjunction with industry reliable sources such as Claritas or Simmons, and merges this with data referring to the page where the ad is shown, the category of the site and more recent events (i.e. News, etc.). In this way the audience member being potentially show the advertisements is evaluated based on more recent, timely data and positioned as either more or less desirable to an advertiser or more or less likely to become a customer. In addition, we can overlay the traditional targeting metrics such as frequency caps and successive messaging to determine the most effective model for reaching and converting customers while limiting budget exposure. It’s a higher reward, lower risk model which is becoming more effective as time moves forward.

The technology for Audience Screening is beneficial to the publishers because it allows them to further segment their audience without the weight of customer surveys and deeper analytics packages being overload in their existing inventory. The technology works simply with a pixel tag being placed on the publisher’s site and a simple database feed being established whereby the technology owner can amass a wealth of information concerning past habits and click streams as well as the syndicated data sources being used to categorize the audience members, or potential customers.

== See also ==
- Ad serving
- Marketing
- E-marketing
- Internet marketing
- Conversion optimization
- Affiliate marketing
- Social marketing
- E-mail marketing
- Viral marketing
- Promotion
- Direct marketing
- Spamming and E-mail spam
