= Multivariate landing page optimization =

Test variations of web page elements to find the best one

Multivariate landing page optimization (MVLPO) is a specific form of landing page optimization where multiple variations of visual elements (e.g., graphics, text) on a webpage are evaluated. For example, a given page may have k choices for the title, m choices for the featured image or graphic, and n choices for the company logo. This example yields k×m×n landing page configurations.

The first application of an experimental design for MVLPO was performed by Moskowitz Jacobs Inc. in 1998 as a simulation/demonstration project for LEGO. MVLPO did not become a mainstream approach until 2003 or 2004.

Multivariate landing page optimization can be executed in a live (production) environment, or through simulations and market research surveys.

== Overview ==
Multivariate landing page optimization is based on experimental design (e.g., discrete choice, conjoint analysis, Taguchi methods, IDDEA, etc.), which tests a structured combination of webpage elements. Some vendors (e.g., Memetrics.com) use a "full factorial" approach, which tests all possible combinations of elements. This approach requires a smaller sample size—typically, many thousands—than traditional fractional Taguchi designs to achieve statistical significance. This quality is one reason that choice modeling won the Nobel Prize in 2000. Fractional designs typically used in simulation environments require the testing of small subsets of possible combinations, and have a higher margin of error. Some critics of the approach question the possible interactions between the elements of the webpages, and the inability of most fractional designs to address this issue.

To resolve the limitations of fractional designs, an advanced simulation method based on the Rule Developing Experimentation (RDE) paradigm was introduced. RDE creates individual models for each respondent, discovers any and all synergies and suppressions among the elements, uncovers attitudinal segmentation, and allows for databasing across tests and over time.

== Live environment execution ==
In live environment MVLPO execution, a special tool makes dynamic changes to a page so that visitors are directed to different executions of landing pages created according to an experimental design. The system keeps track of the visitors and their behavior—including their conversion rate, time spent on the page, etc. Once sufficient data has accumulated, the system estimates the impact of individual components on the target measurement (e.g., conversion rate).

Live environment execution has the following advantages:

- Capable of testing the effect of variations as a real-life experience
- Generally transparent to visitors
- Relatively simple and inexpensive to execute

Live environment execution has the following disadvantages:

- High cost
- Increased complexity involved in modifying a production-level website
- Long period of time required to achieve statistically reliable data. This situation is due to variations in the amount of traffic that generates the data necessary for a decision.
- Likely inappropriate for low-traffic, high-importance websites when the site administrators do not want to lose any potential customers

== Simulation (survey) execution ==
In simulation (survey) MVLPO execution, the foundation consists of advanced market research techniques. In the research phase, the respondents are directed to a survey that presents them with a set of experimentally designed combinations of a landing page. The respondents rate each version based on some factor (e.g., purchase intent). At the end of the research phase, regression analysis models are created either for individual pages or for the entire panel of pages. The outcome relates the presence or absence of page elements on the different landing page executions to the respondents’ ratings. These results can be used to synthesize new landing pages as combinations of the top-scoring elements optimized for subgroups or market segments, with or without interactions.

Simulation execution has the following advantages:

- Faster and easier to prepare and execute in many cases, as compared to live environment execution
- Applicable to low-traffic websites
- Capable of producing more robust and rich data because of increased control over the page design

Simulation execution has the following disadvantages:

- Possible bias because of a simulated environment rather than a live environment.
- Necessity to recruit and optionally incentivize the respondents
