= David Vitek =

Australian entrepreneur (born 1974)

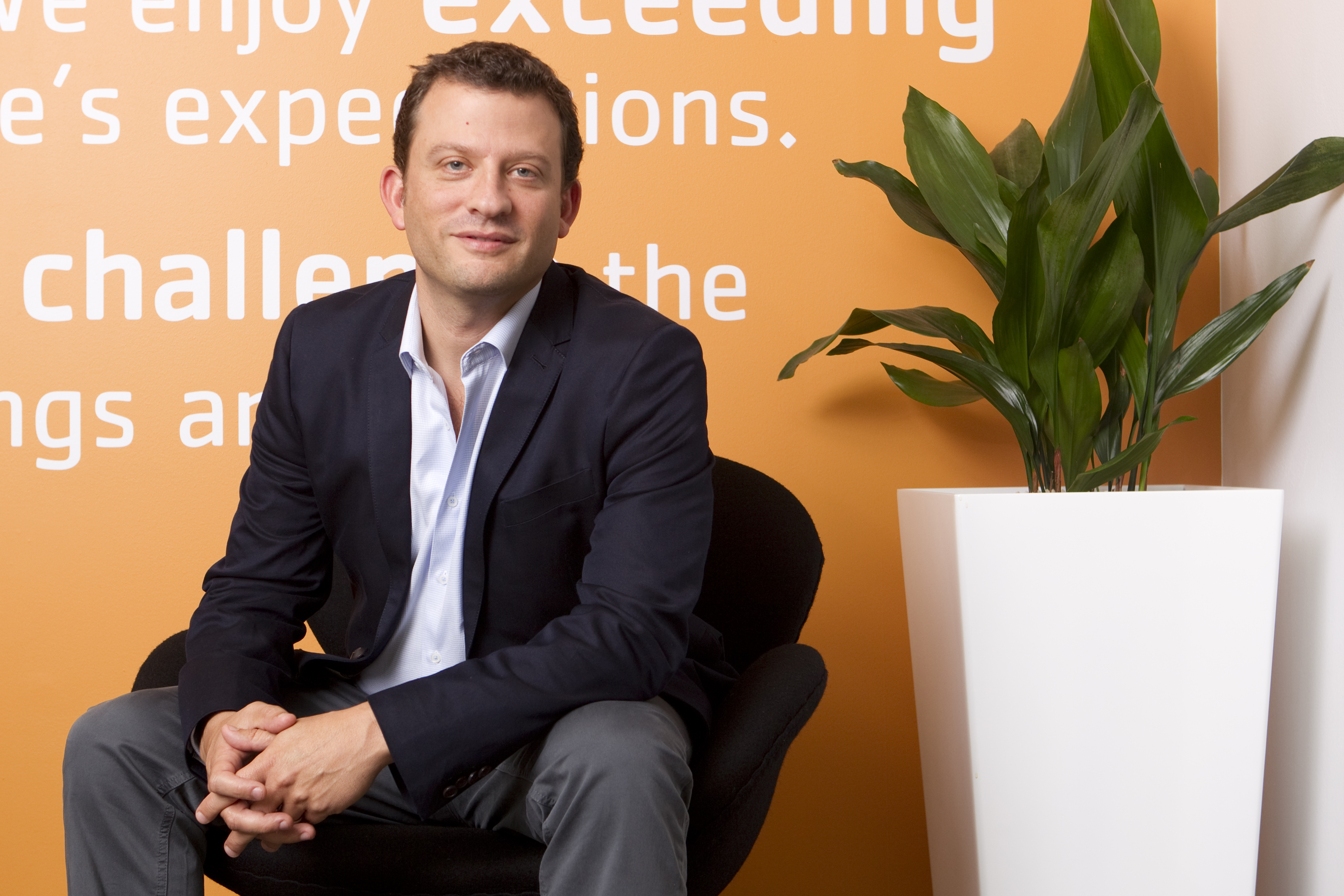
- David Vitek profile picture
- Born: 10 November 1974 (age 52)
- Occupations: CEO, hipages Group
- Known for: Founder, hipages Group

David Vitek is an Australian entrepreneur. He is the co-founder of hipages Group, a lead generation and online directory service connecting consumers to tradesmen. Vitek founded hipages with childhood friend, Roby Sharon-Zipser in 2004. The company started as Viteknologies, an online directory with a focus on natural therapies. The founders decided to expand and change the primary focus to tradesmen as well as natural therapies and pet services. As CEO, Vitek grew the directory to record more than 40,000 businesses registered covering over 1,200 categories with 75,000 written recommendations from homeowners, making hipages one of Australia's largest on-demand home services marketplace and leading sites for finding local tradespeople. Vitek previously worked for a startup company called Report Control, and then later he was an engineer at IBM.

Vitek resigned as CEO in 2019, after hipages posted losses of $13 million, up from $8.5 million the year before. In 2020 Vitek started a new venture: Kidsbook - a booking platform for kids activities.
