= Email appending =

Email appending, also known as e-appending, is a marketing practice that involves taking known customer data (first name, last name, and postal address) and matching it against a vendor's database to obtain email addresses. The purpose is to grow one's email subscriber list with the intent of sending customers information via email instead of through traditional mail. Email appending is a controversial practice in the email marketing world, with critics claiming that sending email to people who never explicitly opted-in is against best practices.

An email appending process involves either a business or consumer database made up of contacts including their name, address and company name [for business contacts]. If the company wants to expand into email communication, then they can involve a service provider that has a database of email addresses in order to merge the data and append business or consumer email addresses to their existing file. In this way they can have an updated database with the current email address of individuals on the list. The success of email appending depends on the quality of both databases being merged.

Like other forms of Database marketing, marketing materials sent using e-pending may be considered spam. Mailers using appending by definition do not have consent of the individuals on their lists, since the individuals did not disclose their email addresses to begin with. Mail sent by appending methods therefore is Opt-out instead of Opt-in e-mail.

In September 2011, The Messaging Anti-Abuse Working Group (MAAWG) released a position paper stating the practice of email appending is in direct violation to their values and is an abusive practice.
