= Conversion rate optimization =

Concept in digital marketing

A bar chart showing three stages in a "sales funnel": "saw the advertisement" -> "clicked the advertisement" -> "bought the product". The three stages have two conversion rates to be optimized.

Conversion rate optimization (CRO) is the systematic process of increasing the percentage of users or website visitors who complete a desired action, such as purchasing a product, subscribing to a service, or submitting contact information.

CRO is widely used across digital platforms including websites, mobile applications, and online marketing campaigns.

== History ==
Online conversion rate optimization (or website optimization) was born out of the need of e-commerce marketers to improve their website's performance in the aftermath of the dot-com bubble, when technology companies started to be more aware about their spending, investing more in website analytics. After the burst, with website creation being more accessible, many pages with poor user experience were created. As competition grew on the web during the early 2000s, website analysis tools became available, and awareness of website usability grew, internet marketers were prompted to produce measurables for their tactics and improve their website's user experience.

In 2004, new tools enabled internet marketers to experiment with website design and content variations to determine which layouts, copy text, offers, and images perform best. Testing started to be more accessible and known. This form of optimization accelerated in 2007 with the introduction of the free tool Google Website Optimizer. Google later replaced this tool with Google Optimize, which it subsequently discontinued along with Optimize 360 in September, 2023.

Conversion rate optimization shares many principles with direct response marketing – a marketing approach that emphasizes tracking, testing, and on-going improvement. Direct marketing was popularized in the early twentieth century and supported by the formation of industry groups such as the Direct Marketing Association, which was formed in 1917 and later named Data & Marketing Association and acquired by the Association of National Advertisers following the announcement on May 31, 2018.

Like modern day conversion rate optimization, direct response marketers also practice A/B testing or split-testing, response tracking, and audience testing to optimize mail, radio, and print campaigns.

== Methodology ==
Conversion rate optimization seeks to increase the percentage of website visitors that take a specific action (often submitting a web form, making a purchase, signing up for a trial, etc.) by methodically testing alternate versions of a page or process and through removing impediments to user experience and improving page loading speeds. In doing so, businesses are able to generate more leads or sales without investing more money on website traffic, hence increasing their marketing return on investment and overall profitability.

Statistical significance helps us understand that the result of a test is not achieved merely based on chance.

There are several approaches to conversion optimization with two main schools of thought prevailing in the last few years. One school is more focused on testing to discover the best way to increase website, campaign, or landing page conversion rates. The other school is focused on the pretesting stage of the optimization process. In this second approach, the optimization company will invest a considerable amount of time in understanding the audience and then creating a targeted message that appeals to that particular audience. Only then would it be willing to deploy testing mechanisms to increase conversion rates.

== Calculation of conversion rate ==
A conversion rate is defined as the percentage of visitors who complete a goal, as set by the site owner. It is calculated as the total number of conversions, divided by the total number of people who visited your website.

$$\mathrm{Conversion\ rate} = \frac{\mathrm{Conversions}}{\mathrm{Number\ of\ visitors}}$$

For example, a website that receives 200 visitors in a day, and 30 of those visitors sign up for its email newsletter (its owner's chosen conversion to measure). The site's conversion rate would be 15% for that day.

== See also ==
- Audience screen
- Behavioral targeting
- Conversion marketing § Conversion rate
- Digital marketing engineer
- Direct marketing
- Internet marketing
- Multivariate testing
- Promotion
- Split testing
- Web personalization
- A/B testing
- User Intent
- Search engine optimization
- Google PageSpeed Tools
