= National Thoroughbred Racing Association =

Horse racing organization

- Founded: December 1997 in New York City, New York, U.S.
- Headquarters: Lexington, Kentucky, U.S.
- Key people: Tom Rooney, President and CEO
- Website: www.ntra.com

The National Thoroughbred Racing Association (NTRA) is a broad-based coalition of American horse racing interests consisting of leading thoroughbred racetracks, owners, breeders, trainers and affiliated horse racing associations, charged with increasing the popularity of horse racing and improving economic conditions for industry participants. The NTRA has offices in Lexington, Kentucky, and Rye Brook, New York.

Historically, it is the marketing departments of the individual tracks, not the national marketing campaigns, which have attracted a fan base. In 2012, the radio campaign by advertising agency, DeVito/Verdi, led to an increase in a younger, more affluent fan base, and won the Mercury awards for the best radio campaign.

The current President and CEO of NTRA is Tom Rooney, a former member of Congress from Florida.

== History ==
=== Founding and early lobbying ===
The NTRA was formed in 1998 with startup funding provided by Breeders' Cup Limited, Thoroughbred Owners and Breeders Association, The Jockey Club, Keeneland Association, Oak Tree Racing Association and the National Thoroughbred Association. It replaced the Thoroughbred Racing Associations of North America as the sponsor of the American Horse of the Year awards in 1998.

Beginning in the late 1990s, the NTRA operated a number of lobbying campaigns in Washington, D.C. They NTRA registered a "hard money" political action committee with the Federal Election Commission on July 14, 2000, with the organization quoting that "a $1-million PAC is a necessary complement to the NTRA's federal lobbying efforts."

=== Online wagering - Federal authorization ===
On December 15, 2000, the United States Congress passed a package of appropriations bills which included an amendment to the Interstate Horseracing Act (IHA), a bill first enacted in 1978. The NTRA had been a key lobbying team behind the new legislation, and the IHA Amendment was signed by President Bill Clinton on December 22 and clarified that the US horse racing industry could conduct interstate simulcasting and "commingling of pools and account wagering," so long as the states where the activity occurred permitted such activity. This legislation confirmed that Internet-based wagering related to horse racing was legal, so long as the wagering business could confirm the identity and age via closed-loop authentication. Separate gambling legislation known as the Federal Wire Act that historically prohibited any betting over state lines via technology stayed intact, with horse racing becoming the sole exemption for federally recognized online gambling in states that authorized the activity.

=== Federal tax relief ===
Beginning in 2002 the NTRA lobbying team advocated for H.R. 4474, which gained bipartisan support for its proposal to eliminate the 30% tax that the U.S. government then placed on all international bets. This legislation was signed into law in by President George W. Bush October 22, 2004.

In 2006 the NTRA lobbying team secured an additional exemption for horse racing in the Unlawful Internet Gambling Enforcement Act of 2006, signed by President Bush on October 13, 2006.

== Marketing and advertising ==
Historically, it is the marketing departments of the individual tracks, not the national marketing campaigns, which have attracted a fan base. In 2012, the radio campaign by advertising agency, DeVito/Verdi, led to an increase in a younger, more affluent fan base, and won the Mercury award for the best radio campaign.

In September 2017, two of the National Thoroughbred Racing Association's radio ads, created by DeVito/Verdi, won "Hall of Fame" awards at the 2017 Clio Awards show. The Hall of Fame selections are for "outstanding work from the past that has stood the test of time and cemented a place of honor and respect in the hearts and memories of consumers and advertising professionals alike".

== Tracks ==
=== Northeast ===
- Aqueduct (Ozone Park, NY)
- Belmont Park (Elmont, NY)
- Finger Lakes (Farmington, NY) [Inactive]
- Monmouth Park (Oceanport, NJ) [Inactive]
- Saratoga (Saratoga Springs, NY)
- Suffolk Downs (Boston, MA)

=== Midwest ===
- Canterbury Park (Shakopee, MN)
- Indiana Grand (Shelbyville, IN)

=== South ===
- Churchill Downs (Louisville, KY)
- Fair Grounds (New Orleans, LA)
- Gulfstream Park (Hallandale Beach, FL)
- Keeneland (Lexington, KY)
- Kentucky Downs (Franklin, KY)
- Laurel Park (Laurel, MD)
- Pimlico (Baltimore, MD)
- Turfway Park (Florence, KY)

=== West ===
- Del Mar (Del Mar, CA)
- Golden Gate (Albany, CA)
- Los Alamitos (Los Alamitos, CA)
- Santa Anita Park (Arcadia, CA)
- Sunland Park (Sunland Park, NM)

=== Canada ===
- Woodbine (Toronto, ON)
