= Email spam legislation by country =

The following table represents laws in respective countries or jurisdictions which restrict the use of Email spam.

Note: Countries / Jurisdictions marked with red are listed in the Spamhaus' Worst Spam Origin Countries (March 2020).

Jurisdiction	Legislation	Section	Implemented	Ref.
Argentina	Personal Data Protection Act (2000)	§ 27	October 30, 2000	
Australia	Spam Act 2003	Part 2	12 December 2003	
Austria	Austrian Telecommunications Act 1997	§ 107		
Belgium	Wet van 11 maart 2003 betreffende bepaalde juridische aspecten van de diensten van de informatiemaatschappij / Loi du 11 mars 2003 sur certains aspects juridiques des services de la société de l'information ("Law of March 11, 2003 concerning certain legal aspects of information society services")		27 March 2003	
Brazil	None (loosely; Movimento Brasileiro de Combate ao Spam)			
Bulgaria	The Law of electronic commerce (2006)	Чл.5,6	December 26, 2006	
Canada	Personal Information Protection and Electronic Documents Act 2000 (PIPEDA)			
Canada	Fighting Internet and Wireless Spam Act 2010			
Canada	Canada's Anti-Spam Legislation 2014 (CASL)			
China	Regulations on Internet email Services		30 March 2006	
Colombia	Law of Habeas Data	§ 6	31 December 2008	
Croatia	Electronic Communications Act	§ 107	22 July 2017	
Cyprus	Regulation of Electronic Communications and Postal Services Law of 2004	§ 6		
Czech Republic	Act No. 480/2004 Coll., on Certain Information Society Services	§ 7		
Denmark	Danish marketing practices act	§ 10		
Estonia	Electronic Communications Act	§ 103	1 January 2005	
European Union	Directive on Privacy and Electronic Communications	Art. 13	31 October 2003	
Finland	Act on Data Protection in Electronic Communications (516/2004)			
France	Loi du 21 juin 2004 pour la confiance dans l’économie numérique ("Law of June 21, 2004 for confidence in the digital economy")	Art. 22		
Germany	Gesetz gegen den unlauteren Wettbewerb (UWG) ("Unfair Competition Act")	§ 7		
Hong Kong	Unsolicited Electronic Messaging Ordinance		22 December 2007	
Hungary	Act CVIII of 2001 on Electronic Commerce	Art. 14		
India	None (loosely; Information Technology Act, 2000 § 67)			
Indonesia	Undang-undang Informasi dan Transaksi Elektronic (ITE) (Internet Law)			
Ireland	European Communities (Electronic Communications Networks and Services) (Data Protection and Privacy) Regulations 2003	Section 13 (1) (b)	6 November 2003	
Israel	Communications Law (Telecommunications and Broadcasting), 1982 (Amendment 2008)	Art. 30	December 2008	
Italy	Data Protection Code (Legislative Decree no. 196/2003)	§ 130		
Japan	The Law on Regulation of Transmission of Specified Electronic Mail		April 2002	
Malaysia	Communications and Multimedia Act 1998			
Malta	Data Protection Act (CAP 440)	§ 10		
Mexico	None			
Netherlands	Dutch Telecommunications Act	Art. 11.7		
New Zealand	Unsolicited Electronic Messages Act 2007	All	5 September 2007	
Norway	Lov om kontroll med markedsføring og avtalevilkår mv. (markedsføringsloven)	Chap. 3 - § 15	1 March 2001	
Pakistan	Prevention of Electronic Crimes Ordinance 2007	§ 14	31 December 2007	
Russia	None (loosely: Russian Civil Code: Art. 309)			
Singapore	Spam Control Act 2007		15 June 2007	
South Africa	Electronic Communications and Transactions Act, 2002	§ 45		
South Africa	Consumer Protection Act, 2008	§ 11	October 2010	
South Korea	Act on Promotion of Information and Communication and Communications Network Utilization and Information Protection	Art. 50		
Spain	Act 34/2002 of 11 July on Information Society Services and Electronic Commerce			
Sweden	Marknadsföringslagen (1995:450) "Swedish Marketing Act"	§ 13b		
Switzerland	Gesetz gegen den unlauteren Wettbewerb (2007)	Art. 3, Buchst. o		
Turkey	Elektronik Ticaretin Düzenlenmesi Hakkında Kanun "Act About Regulation of E-Commerce"			
Ukraine				
United Kingdom	Privacy and Electronic Communications (EC Directive) Regulations 2003			
United States	Controlling the Assault of Non-Solicited Pornography and Marketing Act of 2003 (CAN-SPAM Act of 2003)	All	16 December 2003	

== See also ==
- Spamming
- Coalition Against Unsolicited Commercial Email (CAUCE)
- List of countries by number of Internet users
