= Melaleuca, Inc. v. Hansen =

2011 United States District Court case

- Court: United States District Court for the District of Idaho
- Full case name: Melaleuca, Inc. v. Hansen
- Decided: April 15, 2011
- Citation: No. 10-553, 2011 WL 1458351 (D. Idaho Apr. 15, 2011)

Case history
- Prior actions: Melaleuca, Inc. v. Hansen, No. 07-212 (D. Idaho Sept. 30, 2010)

Court membership
- Judge sitting: Honorable Edward Lodge

Keywords
- CAN-SPAM Act of 2003, spam, collateral estoppel, standing (law), summary judgment

Melaleuca, Inc. v. Hansen was a United States District Court for the District of Idaho case which clarified the meaning of "internet access provider" and "direct adverse" effect as used in the Controlling the Assault of Non-Solicited Pornography and Marketing Act of 2003, or CAN-SPAM Act of 2003, 15 U.S.C. ch. 103

Among several claims, Melaleuca, Inc. claimed that Hansen violated the "CAN-SPAM" Act by emailing Melaleuca executives and trying to induce them to leave the company. Hansen filed a motion to dismiss for lack of standing on the CAN-SPAM claims. The court dismissed spam claims due to lack of standing (law) under the CAN-SPAM Act of 2003.

== Background ==
Hansen was an independent marketing executive for a multi-level marketing company called ITV. One of Hansen's work tasks involved getting customers to join ITV as marketing executives.

Hansen e-mailed some of Melaleuca's marketing executives, informing them about ITV and inviting them to discover new business opportunities. Some of these individuals were users of an "i-glide" email service. Melaleuca owned the domain name "i-glide.net", which provided its employees with the option of purchasing Internet services, including email. It provided these services through a third party internet service provider called IP Applications. As such, it did not have control or access to the hardware that enabled access to i-glide customers, nor did it control the spam filters applied to the emails.

== First District Court Decision (Melaleuca I) ==
The court dismissed Melaleuca's suit without prejudice, finding lack of standing. To have standing under the CAN-SPAM Act of 2003, a plaintiff must be:

1. a "provider of Internet access service" who was
2. "adversely affected" by violations of the Act.

=== Melaleuca was not an ISP under the CAN-SPAM Act ===
Section 7702 of the CAN-SPAM Act defines an IAS by referencing 47 U.S.C. § 231, which states:

The term "Internet access service" means a service that enables users to access content, information, electronic mail, or other services offered over the Internet, and may also include access to proprietary content, information, and other services as part of a package of services offered to consumers. Such term does not include telecommunications services.

— 47 U.S.C. § 231

The court found that Melaleuca did not fall under the definition of an "internet access provider" (IAS), since it did not play more than a nominal role in internet-related services. Although Melaleuca owned the domain name and provided e-mail addresses, it provided internet access through an internet service provider, IP Applications. Although IP Applications later assigned its CAN-SPAM claims to Melaleuca, this assignment was untimely because it occurred after the lawsuit was filed.

=== Melaleuca failed to show direct adverse effect ===
Moreover, the court held that Melaleuca did not show any direct adverse effect or damages from Hansen's emails. Referencing Gordon v. Virtumundo, Inc., a Ninth Circuit case, the court specified that harm must be both real and of the type experienced by ISPs, something "beyond the mere annoyance of spam and greater than the negligible burdens typically borne by an IAS provider in the ordinary course of business." The court held that Melaleuca had not satisfied this legal test that Congress intended for ISP providers.

== Second District Court Decision (Melaleuca II) ==
Melaleuca filed a second suit. Hansen moved to dismiss, claiming that the second suit was barred based on issues of preclusion. Affirming its prior decision on the same issues, the court granted the motion to dismiss. In short, the court re-affirmed that Melaleuca was not a directly affected "internet access provider" under the CAN-SPAM Act of 2003.

== Significance ==
This case is similar to Gordon v. Virtumundo, Inc.. Both cases further define the boundaries of "internet access provider" as used in the CAN-SPAM Act. In Gordon, the Ninth Circuit limited future causes of action under the CAN-SPAM Act by addressing the same standing thresholds under the CAN-SPAM Act. The court determined that Gordon was not a bona fide internet access provider because he did not operate an "authentic" internet service. Providing email accounts alone was not enough, although providing email access and email accounts may be sufficient to qualify under CAN-SPAM. Moreover, the court found that Gordon had not "adversely" suffered from Virtumundo's actions. It further instructs lower courts to review standing for CAN-SPAM claimants with a very critical eye.

== Related Links ==
- Email spam
- Computer Crime
