= Plantation group text messages =

Offensive mass text messages sent after the 2024 United States presidential election

In November 2024, shortly following the 2024 United States presidential election, numerous persons of color and members of the LGBTQ community received racist and homophobic text messages. The messages appear to have been mass-generated by a computer program and contain slight textual variations, frequently addressing the recipient by their first name and containing other personal information.

== Text messages ==
Black Americans began receiving anonymous text messages shortly after the election on November 6, referencing slavery and assigning them to a "plantation group" indexed by a letter or number, with some messages also including the N word. On November 15 it was reported that a variant targeted Latino Americans and LGBTQ people with threats of deportation, or re-education camps, rather than slavery. An example of one of the texts was quoted by reporters as;

"Greetings, [victim's name]. You have been selected to pick cotton at the nearest plantation. Be ready at 12 pm sharp with your belongings. Our executive slaves will come get you in a brown van. Be prepared to be searched down once you've enter the plantation. You are in plantation group W."

The texts were sent from numbers with area codes within at least twenty-five different states, with the company TextNow, which facilitates the creation of phone numbers for free, reporting that one or more of its accounts were used in sending the messages. A spokesperson from the CTIA which is the official trade association of the wireless communication industry, reported that several wireless carriers were impacted and they were working on stopping it from occurring again.

The origin of the texts is unknown, with some of them apparently being routed through Poland using anonymizing software. By November 15, twenty-six states and Washington D.C reported the messages including Alabama, California, New York, Ohio, Pennsylvania, and Tennessee.

== Investigation ==
The Federal Bureau of Investigation condemned the texts and announced an official inquiry into their source. The chairwoman of the Federal Communications Commission announced that they were investigating the messages calling them "unacceptable". Several states including Nevada and Louisiana also announced that they were opening investigations into the messages. The origin of the texts is unknown, with some of them apparently being routed through Poland using anonymizing software.

== Reactions ==
TextNow, whose system was used to send some of the messages, told reporters on November 7 that they shut down the accounts indicated in the messages within an hour of becoming aware of them. They also indicated that they do not tolerate the use of their system to be used to send harassing or spam messages and pledged to work with officials.

Although some of the messages mentioned Donald Trump, who won the election, a spokesman for the Trump campaign denied any connection. John Anthony, a black Republican conservative talk host who received one of the texts, claimed without evidence that they were the work of a leftist group attempting to make Trump look bad.

The NAACP condemned the message, saying that they were consequences of the 2024 Presidential election as racist groups now feel emboldened to spread hate. The CEO of LULAC Juan Proaño spoke out against the messages, stating they were happening because of racism.

== See also ==
- Mobile phone spam
- Your body, my choice
