= Win win (disambiguation) =

A win–win is a game, situation or strategy designed in such a way that all participants can profit from it in one way or another.

Win Win may also refer to:

- Integrative negotiation conducted in such a way that both or all parties can benefit from the outcome
- Win/Win, a 2010 Dutch drama film
- Win Win (film), a 2011 American comedy-drama film
- Win Win (TV series), a Korean Broadcasting System program
- Win Win (racewalker), an athlete at the 1985 Southeast Asian Games
- Win Win (footballer), an athlete on the Myanmar women's national football team
