= Mobile phone spam =

Unwanted communication through a mobile phone

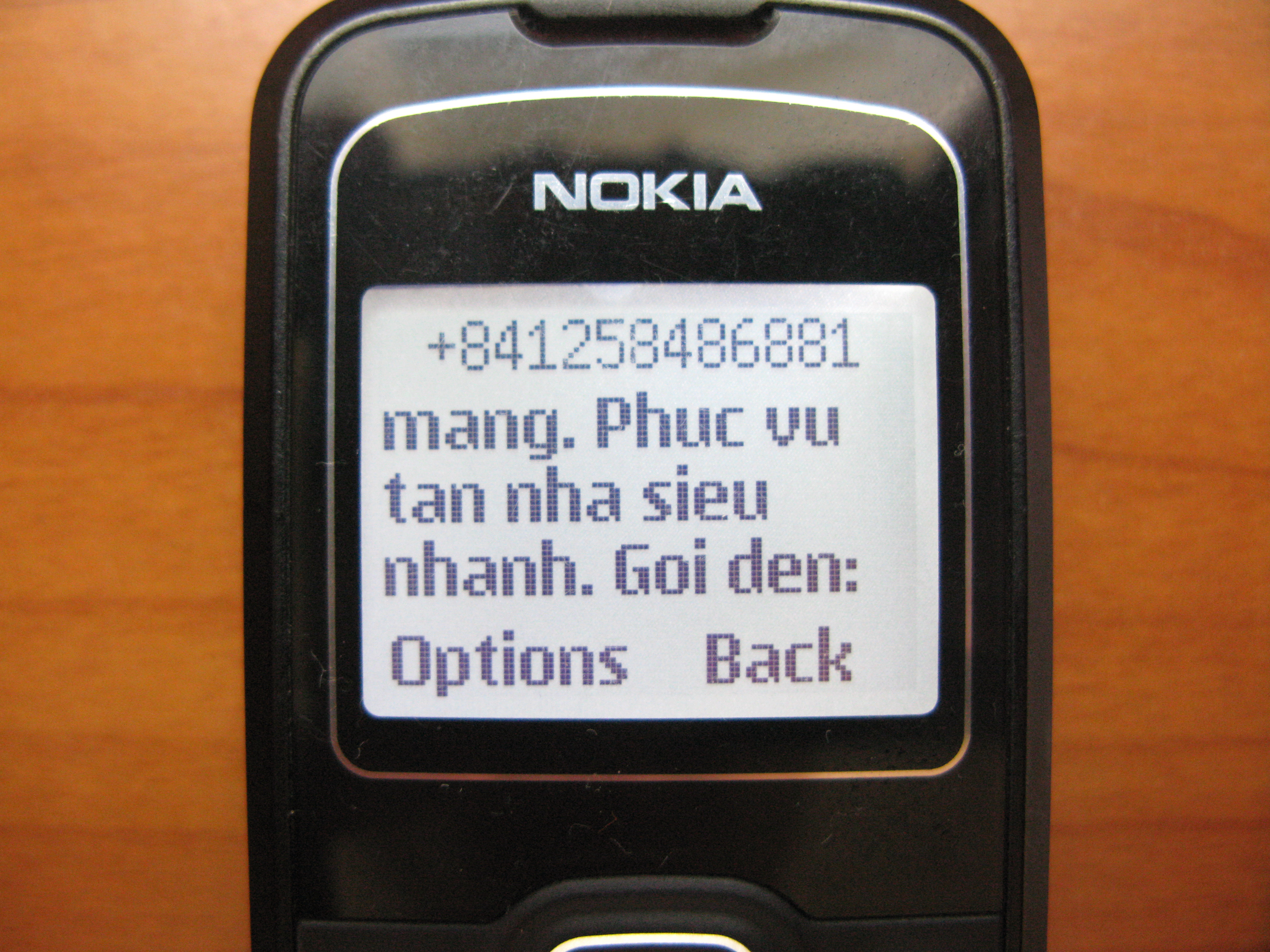
Spam on the display screen of a Vietnamese mobile phone.

Mobile phone spam is a form of spam (unsolicited messages, especially advertising), directed at the text messaging or other communications services of mobile phones or smartphones. As the popularity of mobile phones surged in the early 2000s, frequent users of text messaging began to see an increase in the number of unsolicited (and generally unwanted) commercial advertisements being sent to their telephones through text messaging. This can be particularly annoying for the recipient because, unlike in email, some recipients may be charged a fee for every message received, including spam. Mobile phone spam is generally less pervasive than email spam, where in 2010 around 90% of email is spam. The amount of mobile spam varies widely from region to region. In North America, mobile spam steadily increased after 2008 and accounted for half of all mobile phone traffic by 2019. In parts of Asia up to 30% of messages were spam in 2012.

The lesser and geographically uneven prevalence of mobile phone spam is attributable to geographic variation of prevalence of mobile vs non-mobile electronic communications, the higher cost (to spammers) of and technological barriers to sending mobile messages in some areas, and to law enforcement in others. Today, particularly in North America, most mobile phone spam is sent from mobile devices that have prepaid unlimited messaging rate plans. While the rate plans allow for unlimited messaging, in reality the relatively slow sending rate (on the order of magnitude of 1/s) limits the number of messages that may be sent before an abusing mobile is shut down.

== Terminology ==
Mobile phone spam is described as "mobile spamming", "SMS spam", "text spam", "m-spam" or "mspam". SMiShing involves tricking users into revealing confidential information and is a type of phishing through mobile phone spam.

== Criminality and law enforcement ==
SMS spam is illegal under common law in many jurisdictions as trespass to chattels. Jurisdictions with specific SMS spam regulation and fines include Australia, the EU, and the United States. In the US, violators face substantial costs. For example, in a 2008 settlement, the violator agreed to pay $150 to each spam recipient. In a 2010 class action settlement of Satterfield v. Simon & Schuster, a case that reached the US Ninth Circuit Court of Appeals, defendants agreed to pay $175 to each spam recipient. In subsequent cases, the payment per class member has increased to $200 in 2011 and $500 in 2013. In response to Satterfield, entities who make money sending mobile phone spam formed the Mobile Advocacy Coalition (MAC) to lobby the government to legalize that activity. In the US, the Federal Trade Commission (FTC) has expanded Phone Spam regulations to cover also Voice Spam—mostly in form of prerecorded telemarketing calls—commonly known as robocalls; victims can file a complaint with the FCC. In California, Section 17538.41 of the B&P Code bans text message advertisement. Consumers can sue on an individual or class basis per a private right of action against unfair business practices. In 2019, senators John Thune, Roger Wicker and Ed Markey introduced the TRACED Act to deter criminal robocall violations and improve enforcement which passed the Senate on May 22, 2019 and was signed into law by President Trump in December 2019.

=== Enforcement in small claims court ===
The U.S. Federal Communications Commission (FCC) released an order in Aug, 2004 that reiterated that SMS spam messages to cellphones are illegal under the existing Telephone Consumer Protection Act (TCPA). Each such unsolicited message received without permission entitles the recipient to take the sender to small claims court and collect a minimum of $1 for each violation. They said this in 2003, and reiterated it in 2004: "In 2003, we released a Report and Order in which we reaffirmed that the TCPA prohibits any call using an automatic telephone dialing system or an artificial or prerecorded message to any wireless telephone number. We concluded that this encompasses both voice calls and text calls, including Short Message Service (SMS) text messaging calls, to wireless phone numbers."

The 2003 TCPA Order (18 FCC Rcd at 14115, para. 165) says: “Both the statute and our rules prohibit these calls, with limited exceptions, ‘to any telephone number assigned to a paging service, cellular telephone service, specialized mobile radio service, or other common carrier service, or any service for which the called party is charged.’ This encompasses both voice calls and text calls to wireless numbers including, for example, short message service (SMS) calls, provided the call is made to a telephone number assigned to such service.” (citations omitted).

In the UK, Sending unsolicited text messages is acting contrary to Schedule 2 of the Data Protection Act 1998 and section 22 of the Privacy and Electronic Communications Regulations 2003. Section 13 of Data Protection Act 1998 and section 30 of Privacy and Electronic Communications Regulations 2003 enable consumers to bring proceedings for compensation for spam emails or text messages.

== Legalization ==
In 2013, Club Texting, Inc. petitioned the FCC for a Declaratory Ruling that Text Broadcasters Are Not Senders of Text Messages, and had a private meeting with five FCC staff members to argue their case. This would mean that text broadcasters would no longer be liable for mobile phone spam they conveyed.

== Factors complicating SMS spam reduction ==
Fighting SMS spam is complicated by several factors, including the lower rate of SMS spam (compared to more abused services such as Internet email), which has allowed many users and service providers to ignore the issue, and the limited availability of mobile phone spam-filtering software. Filtering SMS spam at the recipient device would be an imperfect solution in markets where users are charged to receive messages, as the user may still be charged for the message once the provider sent it, even if software on the device blocked it from appearing on the device's display. This problem is not present in most of the world outside the U.S., however, where users are not charged to receive messages.

Providers may fear liability should a legitimate message of an emergency nature be blocked. Nonetheless, many providers voluntarily provide their subscribers technical means for mitigating unsolicited SMS messages.

== Defense ==
There are several actions and strategies that can help reduce SMS spam. Legal actions can be effective and remunerative. Many carriers (such as AT&T, T-Mobile, Verizon and Sprint in the US; and EE, T-Mobile, Orange and O2 in the UK) allow subscribers to report spam by forwarding the spam messages to short code 7726 (spells SPAM on a traditional phone keypad) (33700 in France, 1909 in India), other UK carriers Vodafone and Three use 87726 and 37726 respectively. It is reported that 1/2 million spam reports in France resulted in the disconnection of 300 spammers, and many more cease-and-desist orders were sent. Some spam defense measures depend on detection, and there are two developments in that area: a GSMA pilot spam reporting program, and the development of Open Mobile Alliance (OMA) standards for mobile spam reporting. In February 2010, the GSM Association has announced a pilot program that will allow subscribers to report SMS spam by forwarding it to short code '7726' which spells "SPAM" on most phones. AT&T Mobility, Korea Telecom, and SFR announced their participation. Following the pilot, a number of other mobile operators have joined the GSMA's Spam Reporting Service program.

The Open Mobile Alliance completed its "SpamRep" standard which provides a standardized client-server interface suited for user reporting of mobile email, SMS, MMS and IM spam using a 'This-Is-Spam' button or menu item, as users of wired email systems are now doing. In 2012, responding to the increase in SMS spam, the GSM Association formed a Messaging Security Group to help reduce the impact of mobile spam. Another helpful SMS spam-reduction technique is guarding one's cell phone number. One of the biggest sources of SMS spam is number harvesting carried out by Internet sites offering "free" ring tone downloads. In order to facilitate the downloads, users must provide their phones' numbers; which in turn are used to send frequent advertising messages to the phone. Wording in the sites' Terms of Service intended to make this legal have not survived court challenge.

Another approach to reducing SMS spam that is offered by some carriers involves creating an alias address rather than using the cell phone's number as a text message address. Only messages sent to the alias are delivered; messages sent to the phone's number are discarded. A New York Times article provided detailed information on this in 2008. Another countermeasure is to use a service that provides a public phone number and publishes the SMS messages received at that number to a publicly accessible website. Google Voice can be used in this way, but with numbers and messages kept private. most cell phone providers offer the option of completely disabling all text messaging services on a user's account. This extreme solution, however, is satisfactory only for those users who have neither the need nor the desire to utilize SMS at all.

In June 2009, three major Chinese carriers—China Mobile, China Telecom and China Unicom—imposed limits on text messaging in order to crack down on spam SMS. Under the restrictions, a phone number can send no more than 200 messages per hour and 1000/day on weekdays. In the United States, recipients of SMS spam can file a complaint with the FCC. Phone users in the United Kingdom can use the Information Commissioner's complaints page and can take action against the sender through the small claims court. The ICO however only have powers to act against SMS spam originating in the UK, and in the event Spam originates outside their jurisdiction they will forward details to an equivalent local regulator if one exists.

== Pro-active campaigns ==
In October 2014, a network of solicitors in the UK called PIE (Personal Injury Expert) Lawyers launched a campaign on social media to rid their industry of text message spam. Their feeling was that the use of unsolicited sms marketing was adding further damage to their industry's already poor reputation. The campaign focused on the fact that, under UK law, it is illegal for a solicitor to obtain business by unsolicited direct contact with potential personal injury clients. This is the case even in the event that it is not the solicitor who makes the unsolicited approach. The campaign actively encouraged people to respond to the spam text messages. Upon receipt of an offer of legal representation from a solicitor, the person would then report the solicitor to the Solicitors Regulation Authority (SRA) which would then take appropriate action. Ultimately any solicitor found to be guilty on repeated occasions of obtaining customers by unsolicited approaches could have their practicing certificates revoked thereby ending their career as a solicitor.

== See also ==
- Mobile advertising
- Phone fraud
- Wangiri
- Plantation Group text messages
