= Win, Lose or Draw (disambiguation) =

Win, Lose or Draw is an American television game show that aired from 1987 to 1990.

Win, Lose or Draw may also refer to:

== Television ==
- Win, Lose or Draw (British game show), a 1990s British television game show based on the American show
- Win, Lose or Draw (2014 game show), a Disney Channel game show
- "Win, Lose or Draw" (Everybody Loves Raymond), a 1996 television episode
- "Win, Lose, or Draw" (Parks and Recreation), a 2012 television episode
- Win, Lose or Draw, a 1991 episode of the PBS show Shining Time Station

== Other ==
- Win Lose or Draw (album), a 2005 album by Pras
- Win, Lose or Draw (album), a 1975 album by The Allman Brothers Band
- Win, Lose or Draw (novel), a 2017 crime novel by Australian author Peter Corris
