= Blue Martini Software =

Blue Martini Software, Inc.
- Industry: Software
- Defunct: 2005; 20 years ago
- Fate: Acquired by Multi-Channel Holdings
- Headquarters: San Mateo, California

Blue Martini Software, Inc., was a software developer and professional services provider based in San Mateo, California, that sold and supported an e-commerce, contact center, relationship marketing, and clienteling applications to retailers and other consumer-facing companies. The company was privately held until July 2000, when it went public on the NASDAQ under the ticker BLUE.

== Acquisition history ==
In March 2005, Blue Martini Software was acquired by Multi-Channel Holdings, Inc., a privately held Golden Gate Capital portfolio company which also owned Ecometry Corporation.

In September 2006, Ecometry/Blue Martini Software and GERS Inc. merged to form Escalate Retail.

In February 2011, Escalate Retail was acquired by RedPrairie Corporation. Blue Martini's software applications then became known as the RedPrairie Commerce Suite.

In November 2012, RedPrairie's parent New Mountain Capital acquired JDA Software; following that acquisition, RedPrairie turned support of Blue Martini software to their JDA Software subsidiary.
