= Google Optimize =

Web analytics and testing tool

- Website type: Web optimization
- Dissolved: September 30, 2023; 3 years ago
- Owner: Google
- Website: marketingplatform.google.com/about/optimize/
- Commercial: Yes
- Registration: Required
- Launched: June 1, 2012; 14 years ago
- Current status: Discontinued

Google Optimize, formerly Google Website Optimizer, was a freemium web analytics and testing tool by Google. It allowed running some experiments that are aimed to help online marketers and webmasters to increase visitor conversion rates and overall visitor satisfaction.

The Google Optimize website was used to design experiments and open a WYSIWYG editor for each version tested in the experiment. The free version allowed running a few experiments at the same time, and a user needed to upgrade to Google Optimize 360 to run more of them. There were also other constraints, including limited audience targeting options.

The Google Optimize editor was a Chrome extension that allowed changing some aspects of visible HTML elements. Changes were then applied with JavaScript tailored by rules set in an experiment. Changes could include replacing labels on buttons and links and some style changes like font change, text alignment and such. They could also modify HTML inside chosen elements, which allowed adding more advanced changes. This allowed them to present alternative versions of a static page to different users. GO allowed running some A/B tests — or testing multiple combinations of page elements such as headings, images, or body copy; known as multivariate testing. Other tests included A/B/n testing, where "n" referred to an unknown number of variations a user would test. Split URL testing or redirect testing could be used to check how individual pages are working against each other. Server-Side testing could be used to view reports and results. It could be used at multiple stages in the conversion funnel.

The editor alone would not work for creating complicated tests, especially on pages with dynamic content such as Angular, Vue or React. To use GO on more complicated, dynamic pages, manual work by programmers was required to integrate experiments into frontend or backend code.

On 1 June 2012, Google announced that Google Website Optimizer (the predecessor to Google Optimize) as a separate product would be retired as of 1 August 2012, and its functionality would be integrated into Google Analytics as Google Analytics Content Experiments. In 2016, Google launched Google Optimize, a testing and optimization tool that integrated directly with Google Analytics; a free version was released in beta alongside the paid Optimize 360.

Google Optimize and Optimize 360 were announced to be sunset and no longer available after September 30, 2023.

Google Optimize was part of the Google Marketing Platform.

== See also ==
- Google PageSpeed Tools
- Google Analytics
- Google Search Console
- Google Trends
- Google Search
- Google Ads
- Google Ad Manager
- Google Tag Manager
- Gmail
- Google Drive
- Google Voice Search
