= Title 16 of the Code of Federal Regulations =

U.S. federal rules and regulations on commercial practices

CFR Title 16 – Commercial Practices is one of fifty titles comprising the United States Code of Federal Regulations (CFR), containing the principal set of rules and regulations issued by federal agencies regarding commercial practices. It is available in digital and printed form, and can be referenced online using the Electronic Code of Federal Regulations (e-CFR).

== Structure ==
The table of contents is as follows:

Volume	Chapter	Parts	Regulatory entity
1	I	0–999	Federal Trade Commission
2	II	1000–1799	Consumer Product Safety Commission
