= Google PageSpeed Tools =

Online service by Google

Google PageSpeed is a family of tools by Google, Inc. designed to help optimize website performance. It was introduced at a Developer Conference in 2010. There are four main components of PageSpeed family tools:

- PageSpeed Module (consisting of mod PageSpeed for the Apache HTTP Server and NGX PageSpeed for the nginx)
- PageSpeed Insights
- PageSpeed Service
- PageSpeed Chrome DevTools extension. These components aim to identify and automatically correct deviations from Google's Web Performance Best Practices.

== PageSpeed Modules ==
The PageSpeed Modules are the open-source Apache HTTP Server or nginx web server modules, which automatically apply chosen filters to pages, associated assets (like stylesheets, JavaScript, and HTML files), as well as to images and website cache requirements. These modules do not require modifications to existing content or workflow, meaning that all internal optimizations and changes to files are made on the server side, and present modified files directly to the user. Each of the 40+ filters corresponds to one of Google's web performance best practices rules.

Since the PageSpeed module is an open-source library, it is frequently updated by numerous developers worldwide. It can be deployed by any individual site, hosting providers, or CDNs.

The installation can be done in two ways: from packages or built from source on the following supported platforms:

- Fedora/Rocky, both 32-bit and 64-bit
- Debian/Ubuntu, both 32-bit and 64-bit

=== Ports ===
Other servers that offer a PageSpeed optimization module based on Google's Page Speed SDK:

- Apache Traffic Server - ATS page speed
- Microsoft Internet Information Services - IIS WebSpeed

=== Filters ===
PageSpeed module filters are settings, based on which a web page optimization rule is applied. They can be divided into five main categories:

- Stylesheets optimizations
- Javascript files optimizations
- Images optimizations
- HTML optimizations
- Tracking activity filters

=== Speed impact ===
The PageSpeed Module showed the most significant impact on decreasing web page loading times, payload size, and number of requests compared to other industry options. According to several researchers, 'mod_pagespeed' can reduce loading times by up to 80%, the number of bytes on a wire can be decreased by 30%, and the number of total requests can drop by over 20%. Since many search engines, including Google, employ a ranking algorithm that is affected by a page's loading speed, these optimizations can impact a website's placement in search results. As of February 2015, Google has begun testing “Slow” labels on mobile devices for websites that exceed a certain amount of loading time, prompting developers to examine ways to increase a page's load speed.

Google estimates that for every delay in mobile page load time, the conversion rate drops by 20%.

== PageSpeed Insights (PSI) ==
PageSpeed Insights (PSI) is a free tool from Google that analyzes the performance of a web page on both mobile and desktop devices. It provides suggestions on how to improve the page's speed and overall user experience.

Scoring Categories

PSI assigns scores in four main categories:

- Performance – Measures how quickly content is displayed and becomes interactive, including metrics like LCP, FCP, Total Blocking Time (TBT), and Cumulative Layout Shift (CLS).
- Accessibility – Evaluates how easily users of all abilities can navigate and interact with the page.
- Best Practices – Checks technical quality, including security and adherence to modern web standards.
- SEO – Measures search engine optimization readiness and adherence to SEO best practices.

These categories help developers and website owners identify areas for improvement and optimize pages for a better user experience.

Data and Metrics

PSI utilizes two main types of data:

- Lab Data: Collected in a controlled environment using Lighthouse to simulate user experience. Useful for debugging performance issues.
- Field Data: Real-world user experience data gathered from the Chrome User Experience Report (CrUX) dataset. This data includes metrics like First Contentful Paint (FCP), Largest Contentful Paint (LCP), Interaction to Next Paint (INP), and Cumulative Layout Shift (CLS).

Real-User Experience Data

PSI leverages CrUX data to provide insights into real user experiences. It reports on various metrics over a 28-day period, including:

- First Contentful Paint (FCP): Time taken for the first content to render on the page.
- Largest Contentful Paint (LCP): Time taken for the main content of the page to render.
- Interaction to Next Paint (INP): Time taken for the page to become interactive after the user interacts with it.
- Cumulative Layout Shift (CLS): Measures the amount of unexpected layout shift a user experiences during page load.
- Time to First Byte (TTFB) (Experimental): Time taken for the browser to receive the first byte of response from the server.
- First Input Delay (FID) (Deprecated): Measures the time it takes for a user interaction to be reflected on the page (no longer recommended by Google).

PSI classifies these metrics into three categories based on Web Vitals thresholds: Good, Needs Improvement, and Poor.

Core Web Vitals

A subset of the field data metrics, Core Web Vitals, are critical for a good user experience. These include LCP, INP, and CLS. PSI analyzes these metrics to determine if a page meets the Core Web Vitals assessment criteria. These are also used as a SEO ranking signal.

Lab Diagnostics

PSI uses Lighthouse to analyze a web page in a simulated environment. It provides scores and recommendations for various categories like Performance, Accessibility, Best Practices, and SEO. The Performance category includes metrics like FCP, LCP, CLS, and Time to Interactive, each with scores and improvement suggestions.

== PageSpeed Chrome Extension ==
Pagespeed extension is an extension of Chrome Browser and is a part of Google Chrome Developer Tools. Visitors who use PageSpeed regularly can view all given metrics by PageSpeed Insights directly in a browser and download webpage resources, optimized according to web performance best practices. It has now been deprecated and Google recommends the online version be used instead.

== PageSpeed Service ==
PageSpeed service was a commercial product, provided by Google Inc. The service was offered free of charge since it was still officially in beta version. Service included all Pagespeed Module optimizations and use of Google servers’ infrastructure. Google announced the deprecation of PageSpeed service on 5 May 2015 and turned it off on 3 August 2015.

== See also ==
- Google Optimize
- Web testing
