= Win–loss analytics =

Win–loss analytics involves identifying and analyzing the reasons why a visitor to a website was or wasn't persuaded to engage in a desired action (conversion).

This information allows web teams to improve the website's navigation and content, identify individuals that are more likely to convert, to improve marketing efforts.

== History ==
Determining why one person engaged in a desired action and another did not has long been a topic of interest in sales, where measurement of conversion has always been possible through sales data.

In contrast, marketing has been mostly concerned with targeting with the masses, and the results of marketing have traditionally been more difficult to accurately measure. With the internet, it is much easier for marketers to collect data for analysis and evaluation in order to understand and demonstrate the effectiveness or ineffectiveness of their efforts and to make changes to improve them. Thus yielding the best result of a specific marketing campaign. This is the Win-Loss analytics.

== Win–loss analytics vs. web analytics ==
Web analytics tools have existed since the early days of the internet and are now ubiquitous. These tools provide a bird's eye view of a website's traffic. The information that is gathered allows webmasters to make informed decisions about making changes in order to improve a website.

Win–loss analytics tools track the individual perspectives of each visitor, uncovering who the visitor was, what products they were qualified for, how well they were persuaded, and why they did or didn't convert.

Win Loss programs typically focus on different elements of the buying process, including gathering buyer feedback on the solution being sold (whether it's a product or service), the buyer's perception of the effectiveness of the sales representative or sales team, buyer perceptions of the selling vendor overall (such as the firm's reputation or its long-term financial viability), and price. These categories can be broken down into greater detail for more refined feedback. For example, questions about the product or service might include the intuitiveness of the user interface or the effectiveness of specific features or functionality.
