= Win or Lose =

Win or Lose may refer to:

- "Win or Lose" (Zero Assoluto song), 2008
- "Win or Lose" (Mobb Deep song), 2004
- "Win or Lose", a song by Kid Cudi from Insano (Nitro Mega), 2024
- "Win or Lose", a song by Status Quo from Back to Back, 1983
- "Win or Lose", a song by Earth, Wind & Fire from Faces, 1980
- Win or Lose (miniseries), 2025
