= Lead management =

Acquiring potential new business clients

Lead management is a set of methodologies, systems, and practices designed to generate new potential business clientele, generally operated through a variety of marketing campaigns or programs. Lead management facilitates a business's connection between its outgoing consumer advertising and the responses to that advertising. These processes are designed for business-to-business and direct-to-consumer strategies. Lead management is in many cases a precursor to sales management, customer relationship management and customer experience management. This critical connectivity facilitates business profitability through the acquisition of new customers, selling to existing customers, and creating a market brand. This process has also been referred to as customer acquisition management.

The general principles of lead management create an ordered structure for managing volumes of business inquiries, frequently termed leads. The process creates an architecture for organization of data, distributed across the various stages of a sales process, and across a distributed sales force. With the advent of the Internet and other information systems technologies, this process has rapidly become technology-centric, as businesses practising lead management techniques have shifted much of the prior manual workload to automation systems, though personal interaction with lead inquiries is still vital to success.

Along with its other related business practices like marketing, brand development, advertising, and sales, the goal of an effective lead management initiative is to generate new business revenue, increase visibility, and improve the general attitudes of potential clients and the public at large for future business development.

While simple in scope, lead (or inquiry) flow process can become complex as clients, prospective clients, and sales professionals interact. Interactions and subsequent actions create a variety of potential outcomes, both productive and counter-productive to business development. This ever-increasing number of scenarios creates functional disconnects, in other words, critical opportunities to mishandle an inquiry that reduces or destroys its potential value. Appropriate management of these scenarios is the function of lead management and is the basis of software such as marketing automation.

== Lead management architecture ==
=== Lead generation ===
Generating a lead, or lead generation, can relate to myriad marketing technologies and methodologies. Regardless of how it is achieved, however, from an architectural perspective lead generation is simply the ability to attract the interest of a consumer and capture enough data to validate and prioritize their interest, then contact them.

=== Lead acquisition and distribution ===
Lead acquisition is the first, and possibly the most critical potential disconnect in the lead management process. With billions being spent on advertising expenditures, in many cases the value of those expenditures is reduced because relevant information from responses is not collected or distributed. The value of this process is tightly linked to a variety of consumer response theories that highlight the relevance and responsiveness of the customer experience as being key ingredients in turning potential customers into actual customers. Once acquired, the speed, accuracy, and relevance of response can greatly influence a potential consumer's decision to buy, or not buy, a product or service.

One relevant example of this process is the use of the Internet, online marketing, and Web analytics for high-level lead generation. A consumer generally uses the Internet and makes Internet inquiries for products and services out of a desire for convenience and efficiency of their time. Consequently, they expect a timely, relevant response to inquiries made. If the acquisition and distribution of data collected during their inquiry is not effective, the consumer experience will be negative. No response, poor response, too-early or too late response equals negative impact on consumer attitudes and behavior.

For this particular medium, the lead acquisition architecture generally consists of a Web form to collect consumer data, a database to temporarily or persistently store that information for subsequent distribution, and a software application to distribute the data at appropriate levels.

The distribution architecture will vary widely depending upon the objective of the lead generation. Generation for the purpose of selling the inquiry itself to another organization would typically include a methodology for selecting one or more buyers and then transmitting the lead via a variety of potential means, like: XML, name–value pairs, fax, email, telephone. In the case of leads generated for an organization's own use it may simply consist of a web page to render the contents of the lead database or a simple email action from the Web form itself.

=== Marketing and sales process operations ===
Once the lead information is collected and distributed, it is then transferred to a marketing and/or sales management department, who will continue to implement lead management practices in pursuit of completion of a sale. Established lead management practices should provide the needed connectivity and accountability between those two operational units, and when managed properly, enhances the effectiveness of both operations.

The architectural relationship is much akin to the order carousel in a short order diner. This carousel represents the communication and accountability between the waiter and the cook. Without this simple coordination, orders would be lost, prepared incorrectly, or prepared in random order, failing to meet the expectations of the customer.

For management teams with a solid foundation in lead management principles, the process should create increased efficiency and accountability between marketing and sales activities. As stated previously, the increasing technological foundation of lead and sales management practices provides a number of "closed loop" data circuits, tracking the overall effectiveness of everything from lead generation, to prioritization, to distribution, to final disposition, and then back again to re-calibrate the process.

This part of the marketing system displays analytics data relating to lead generation, lead distribution, and lead outcomes. For the sales department, it supports the distribution of leads, while for sales management, it provides information for monitoring sales staff activity and lead outcomes.

=== Communications ===
The central hub of the lead management process once the prior architectures are in place is communication. Effective lead management principles require intensive and accurate high-level communication, both internally within organizations, and externally with lead inquiries.

Communications functions should include intelligent sourcing of inquiry information, and provide appropriate vehicles for overt contacting methods such as phone, email, or other communication forms. In addition to overt communication methods, technologies now also provide marketing systems the ability to do extensive lead nurturing activities through automation systems, which often include opt-in email listings, automated telephone dialing systems, or hard copy mailing lists to increase visibility, touch on customer need, and increase brand visibility. In many cases, especially where inquiries may not be ready to work with businesses immediately, it is crucial to maintain ongoing nurturing communications that cultivate a lead into future sales, and effective lead management practices include these methods.

=== Analytics ===
The analytics architecture is the last, and once the other architectures are in place, the most critical piece of an effective lead management system. This portion of the architecture allows for the dynamic review and analysis of lead actions, marketing channels, and sales performance. Software of this type is called marketing attribution.

For many organizations, being a pipeline marketing organization that optimizes for post lead metrics such as revenue can be vital in decision making that improve production, return on investment, and the overall performance and cost benefits of their marketing and sales strategies.

== Optimization ==
As larger vendors work with partner organizations such as distributors, resellers, brokers and other channel partners, those vendors often distribute leads to their respective partners to provide a local contact to those prospects and also 'feed' partners with new business opportunities. Today there are two major methods for distributing sales leads to partners: push or pull.

=== Push ===
The push method sends leads to specific partners assuming that those partners will follow up and work on those leads. The challenge with 'push' is the fact that often the local field sales staff may not be able to engage immediately for various reasons such as they are on vacation.

=== Pull ===
The pull method was created to motivate sales staff to 'pull' leads from an online available system, thereby assigning them to a particular person as they are engaged.

== Technical functionality ==
=== Lead acquisition ===
The lead acquisition functionality should allow for the simple and efficient acquisition of lead data into the lead management system. The acquisition functions must be able to support a variety of marketing channels and methods of capturing data. Some examples include:

- Electronic data transfer

This acquisition function may include the transfer of discrete lead data via technologies like name–value pairs, XML, RSS, HTTP POST, and FTP. These technologies can be used in conjunction with an organization's own website or third party lead provider. Often lead providers will deliver leads via a standard email. These leads can be electronically captured by parsing the email and then submitting the lead using one of the methods described above.

- Batch imports

This acquisition function may include imports of multiple leads' data via technologies like Microsoft Excel, CSV, or other formatted batch data values. These technologies can be used to acquire leads that have been stored in other systems, assembled from lists, or other volume sources.

- Quick-apply web forms

This acquisition function may include Web landing pages or sales interfaces. This technology can be used to acquire discrete lead data via manual input into an application-type form.

=== Lead filtering and assessment ===
Businesses need to keep track of all inquiries and sales leads that are generated from numerous sources and know the conversion from the source of various sales leads. Efficient inquiry management systems can save time. Most lead management systems can filter and categorize lead data. There are various ways to accomplish this process, including industry-specific methods. Possible functions include:

- Data verification (i.e., telephone numbers, zip codes, address scrubbing)
- Device Intelligence (i.e., device fingerprint, botnet proxy detection, true geo location, true ip detection)
- Lead nurturing
- Fraud screening
- Data appending (e.g., appending third-party data such as credit, preferences, purchase history)
- Grading/Lead Scoring
- Prioritization
