= CAN-SPAM Act of 2003 =

American law to regulate bulk e-mail

Controlling the Assault of Non-Solicited Pornography And Marketing Act of 2003
- Other short titles: CAN-SPAM Act of 2003
- Long title: An Act to regulate interstate commerce by imposing limitations and penalties on the transmission of unsolicited commercial electronic mail via the Internet.
- Enacted by: the 108th United States Congress

Citations
- Public law: Pub. L. 108–187 (text) (PDF)
- Statutes at Large: 117 Stat. 2699

Codification
- Titles amended: 15 U.S.C.: Commerce and Trade
- U.S.C. sections created: 15 U.S.C. ch. 103

Legislative history
- Introduced in the Senate as S.877 by Conrad Burns (R–MT) on April 10, 2003; Passed the Senate on October 22, 2003 (97–0); Passed the House on November 22, 2003 (392–5); Signed into law by President George W. Bush on December 16, 2003

The Controlling the Assault of Non-Solicited Pornography And Marketing (CAN-SPAM) Act of 2003 is a law passed in 2003 establishing the United States' first national standards for the sending of commercial e-mail. The law requires the Federal Trade Commission (FTC) to enforce its provisions. Introduced by Republican Conrad Burns, the act passed both the House and Senate during the 108th United States Congress and was signed into law by President George W. Bush in December 16, 2003 and was enacted on January 1, 2004.

== History ==
The acronym CAN-SPAM derives from the bill's full name. The bill was sponsored in Congress by Senators Conrad Burns and Ron Wyden.

The CAN-SPAM Act is occasionally referred to by critics as the "You-Can-Spam" Act because the bill fails to prohibit many types of e-mail spam and preempts some state laws that would otherwise have provided victims with practical means of redress. In particular, it does not require e-mailers to get permission before they send marketing messages. It also prevents states from enacting stronger anti-spam protections, and prohibits individuals who receive spam from suing spammers except under laws not specific to e-mail. The Act has been largely unenforced, despite a letter to the FTC from Senator Burns, who noted that "Enforcement is key regarding the CAN-SPAM legislation." In 2004, less than 1% of spam complied with the CAN-SPAM Act of 2003.

The law prescribed the FTC to report back to Congress within 24 months of the effectiveness of the act. Once this took place, no changes were recommended. It also requires the FTC to promulgate rules to shield consumers from unwanted mobile phone spam. On December 20, 2005 the FTC reported that the volume of spam has begun to level off, and due to enhanced anti-spam technologies, less was reaching consumer inboxes. A significant decrease in sexually explicit e-mail was also reported.

Later modifications changed the original CAN-SPAM Act of 2003 by (1) Adding a definition of the term "person"; (2) Modifying the term "sender"; (3) Clarifying that a sender may comply with the act by including a post office box or private mailbox; and (4) Clarifying that to submit a valid opt-out request, a recipient cannot be required to pay a fee, provide information other than his or her email address and opt-out preferences, or take any other steps other than sending a reply email message or visiting a single page on an Internet website.

== The mechanics of CAN-SPAM ==
=== Applicability ===
CAN-SPAM, a direct response of the growing number of complaints over spam e-mails, defines a "commercial electronic mail message" as "any electronic mail message the primary purpose of which is the commercial advertisement or promotion of a commercial product or service (including content on an Internet website operated for a commercial purpose)." It exempts "transactional or relationship messages." The FTC issued final rules (16 CFR 316) clarifying the phrase "primary purpose" on December 16, 2004. Previous state laws had used bulk (a number threshold), content (commercial), or unsolicited to define spam. The explicit restriction of the law to commercial e-mails is widely considered by those in the industry to essentially exempt purely political and religious e-mail from its specific requirements. Such non-commercial messages also have stronger First Amendment protection, as shown in Jaynes v. Commonwealth.

Congress determined that the US government was showing an increased interest in the regulation of commercial electronic mail nationally, that those who send commercial e-mails should not mislead recipients over the source or content of them, and that all recipients of such emails have a right to decline them. However, CAN-SPAM does not ban spam emailing outright, but imposes laws on using deceptive marketing methods through headings that are "materially false or misleading". In addition there are conditions that email marketers must meet in terms of their format, their content, and labeling. The three basic types of compliance defined in the CAN-SPAM Act—unsubscribe, content, and sending behavior — are as follows:

=== Unsubscribe compliance ===
- A visible and operable unsubscribe mechanism is present in all emails.
- Consumer opt-out requests are honored within 10 business days.
- Opt-out lists also known as suppression lists are used only for compliance purposes.

=== Content compliance ===
- Accurate "From" lines
- Relevant subject lines (relative to offer in body content and not deceptive)
- A legitimate physical address of the publisher or advertiser is present. PO Box addresses are acceptable in compliance with 16 CFR 316.2 and if the email is sent by a third party, the legitimate physical address of the entity, whose products or services are promoted through the email should be visible.
- A label is present if the content is adult.

=== Sending behavior compliance ===
- A message cannot be sent without an unsubscribe option.
- A message cannot contain a false header
- A message should contain at least one sentence.
- A message cannot be null.
- Unsubscribe option should be below the message.

There are no restrictions against a company emailing its existing customers or anyone who has inquired about its products or services, even if these individuals have not given permission, as these messages are classified as "relationship" messages under CAN-SPAM. But when sending unsolicited commercial emails, it must be stated that the email is an advertisement or a marketing solicitation. Note that recipients who have signed up to receive commercial messages from you are exempt from this rule.

If a user opts out, a sender has ten days to cease sending and can use that email address only for compliance purposes. The legislation also prohibits the sale or other transfer of an e-mail address after an opt-out request. The law also requires that the unsubscribe mechanism must be able to process opt-out requests for at least 30 days after the transmission of the original message.

Use of automated means to register for multiple e-mail accounts from which to send spam compound other violations. It prohibits sending sexually oriented spam without the label later determined by the FTC of "SEXUALLY EXPLICIT." This label replaced the similar state labeling requirements of "ADV:ADLT" or "ADLT."

CAN-SPAM makes it a misdemeanor to send spam with falsified header information. A host of other common spamming practices can make a CAN-SPAM violation an "aggravated offense," including harvesting, dictionary attacks, IP address spoofing, hijacking computers through Trojan horses or worms, or using open mail relays for the purpose of sending spam.

==== Criminal offenses ====
Although according to the law, legitimate businesses and marketers should be conscientious regarding the aspects mentioned above, there are misinterpretations and fraudulent practices that are viewed as criminal offenses:

- Sending multiple spam emails with the use of a hijacked computer
- Sending multiple emails through Internet Protocol addresses that the sender represents falsely as being his/her property
- Trying to disguise the source of the email and to deceive recipients regarding the origins of the emails, by routing them through other computers
- Sending multiple spam emails via multiple mailings with falsified information in the header
- Using various email accounts obtained by falsifying account registration information, in order to send multiple spam emails.

== Private right of action ==
CAN-SPAM provides a limited private right of action to Internet Access Services that have been adversely affected by the receipt of emails that violate the Act; and does not allow natural persons to bring suit. A CAN-SPAM plaintiff must satisfy a higher standard of proof as compared with government agencies enforcing the Act; thus, a private plaintiff must demonstrate that the defendant either sent the email at issue or paid another person to send it knowing that the sender would violate the Act. Despite this heightened standard, private CAN-SPAM lawsuits have cropped up around the country, as plaintiffs seek to take advantage of the statutory damages available under the Act.

== Overriding state anti-spam laws ==
CAN-SPAM preempts (supersedes) state anti-spam laws that do not deal with false or deceptive activity. The relevant portion of CAN-SPAM reads:

This chapter supersedes any statute, regulation, or rule of a State or political subdivision of a State that expressly regulates the use of electronic mail to send commercial messages, except to the extent that any such statute, regulation, or rule prohibits falsity or deception in any portion of a commercial electronic mail message or information attached thereto.

Though this move was criticized by some anti-spam activists, some legal commentators praised it, citing a heavily punitive California law seen as over broad and a wave of allegedly dubious suits filed in Utah.

== CAN-SPAM and the FTC ==
CAN-SPAM allows the FTC to implement a national do-not-email list similar to the FTC's popular National Do Not Call Registry against telemarketing, or to report back to Congress why the creation of such a list is not currently feasible. The FTC soundly rejected this proposal, and such a list will not be implemented. The FTC concluded that the lack of authentication of email would undermine the list, and it could raise security concerns.

The legislation prohibits e-mail recipients from suing spammers or filing class-action lawsuits. It allows enforcement by the FTC, state attorneys general, Internet service providers, and other federal agencies for special categories of spammers (such as banks). An individual might be able to sue as an ISP if (s)he ran a mail server, but this would likely be cost-prohibitive and would not necessarily hold up in court. Individuals can also sue using state laws about fraud, such as Virginia's that gives standing based on actual damages, in effect limiting enforcement to ISPs.

The McCain amendment made businesses promoted in spam subject to FTC penalties and enforcement remedies, if they knew or should have known that their business was being promoted by the use of spam. This amendment was designed to close a loophole that allowed those running affiliate programs to allow spammers to abuse their programs, and encouraged such businesses to assist the FTC in identifying such spammers.

Senator Jon Corzine sponsored an amendment to allow bounties for some informants. The FTC has limited these bounties to individuals with inside information. The bounties are expected to be over $100,000 but none have been awarded yet.

== Reaction ==
Those opposing spam greeted the new law with dismay and disappointment, almost immediately dubbing it the "You Can Spam" Act. Internet activists who work to stop spam stated that the Act would not prevent any spam — in fact, it appeared to give federal approval to the practice, and it was feared that spam would increase as a result of the law. CAUCE (Coalition Against Unsolicited Commercial Email) stated:

This legislation fails the most fundamental test of any anti-spam law, in that it neglects to actually tell any marketers not to spam. Instead, it gives each marketer in the United States one free shot at each consumer's e-mail inbox, and will force companies to continue to deploy costly and disruptive anti-spam technologies to block advertising messages from reaching their employees on company time and using company resources. It also fails to learn from the experiences of the states and other countries that have tried "opt-out" legal frameworks, where marketers must be asked to stop, to no avail.

AOL Executive Vice President and General Counsel Randall Boe stated:

[CAN-SPAM] not only empowered us to help can the spam, but also to can the spammers as well. ... Our actions today clearly demonstrate that CAN-SPAM is alive and kicking — and we're using it to give hardcore, outlaw spammers the boot.

Advertising organizations such as the Data & Marketing Association (DMA) have sought to weaken implementation of the law in various ways. These include lengthening the time for honoring opt-outs from 10 business days to 31 calendar days, limiting the validity of opt-out requests to no more than two to three years, and eliminating rewards to persons who assist the Federal Trade Commission in enforcement of the act. The DMA has also opposed provisions requiring the subject line of spam to indicate that the message is an advertisement.

== Criminal enforcement ==
On February 16, 2005, Anthony Greco, 18, of Cheektowaga, New York, was the first person to be arrested under the CAN-SPAM Act of 2003. After pleading guilty, he was sentenced in a closed session.

Within a few months, hundreds of lawsuits had been filed by an alliance of ISPs. Many of these efforts resulted in settlements; most are still pending. Though most defendants were "John Does," many spam operations, such as Scott Richter's, were known.

On April 29, 2004, the United States government brought the first criminal and civil charges under the Act. Criminal charges were filed by the United States Attorney for the Eastern District of Michigan, and the FTC filed a civil enforcement action in the Northern District of Illinois. The defendants were a company, Phoenix Avatar, and four associated individuals: Daniel J. Lin, James J. Lin, Mark M. Sadek, and Christopher Chung of West Bloomfield, Michigan. Defendants were charged with sending hundreds of thousands of spam emails advertising a "diet patch" and "hormone products." The FTC stated that these products were effectively worthless. Authorities said they face up to five years in prison under the anti-spam law and up to 20 years in prison under U.S. mail fraud statutes.

On September 27, 2004, Nicholas Tombros pled guilty to charges and became the first spammer to be convicted under the Can-Spam Act of 2003. He was sentenced in July 2007 to three years probation, six months house arrest, and a fine of $10,000.

On April 1, 2006, Mounir Balarbi, of Tangier, Morocco, was the first person outside the United States to have an arrest warrant validated under the CAN-SPAM Act of 2003. Mounir's trial was held in absentia, and he was sentenced in a closed session.

On January 16, 2006, Jeffrey Goodin, 45, of Azusa, California, was convicted by a jury in United States district court in Los Angeles in United States v. Goodin, U.S. District Court, Central District of California, 06-110, under the CAN-SPAM Act (the first conviction under the Act), and on June 11, 2007, he was sentenced to 70 months in federal prison. Out of a potential sentence of 101 years, prosecutors asked for a sentence of 94 months. Goodin was already detained in custody, as he had missed a court hearing.

As of late 2006, CAN-SPAM has been all but ignored by spammers. A review of spam levels in October 2006 estimated that 75% of all email messages were spam, and the number of spam emails complying with the requirements of the law were estimated to be 0.27% of all spam emails. As of 2010, about 90% of email was spam.

On August 25, 2005, three people were indicted on two counts of fraud and one count of criminal conspiracy. On March 6, 2006 Jennifer R. Clason, 33, of Raymond, New Hampshire, pled guilty and was to be sentenced on June 5, 2006. She faced a maximum sentence of 5 years on each of the three counts and agreed to forfeit money received in the commission of these crimes. On June 25, 2007, the remaining two were convicted of spamming out millions of e-mail messages that included hardcore pornographic images. Jeffrey A. Kilbride, 41, of Venice, California, and James R. Schaffer, 41, of Paradise Valley, Arizona, were convicted on eight counts in U.S. District Court in Phoenix, Arizona. Both were sentenced to five years in prison, and ordered to forfeit $1,300,000. The charges included conspiracy, fraud, money laundering, and transportation of obscene materials. The trial, which began on June 5, was the first to include charges under the CAN-SPAM Act of 2003, according to the Department of Justice. The specific law that prosecutors used under the CAN-Spam Act was designed to crack down on the transmission of pornography in spam. Two other men, Andrew D. Ellifson, 31, of Scottsdale, Arizona, and Kirk F. Rogers, 43, of Manhattan Beach, California, also pled guilty to charges under the CAN-SPAM Act related to this spamming operation. Both were scheduled to be sentenced on June 5, 2006 in Phoenix. After sentencing, Ellifson received a presidential pardon by President Obama.

== Civil enforcement ==
In July 2005, the Federal Trade Commission lodged civil CAN-SPAM complaints against nine companies alleging that they were responsible for spam emails that had been sent by them or by their affiliates. Eight of the nine companies, Cyberheat of Tucson, Arizona, APC Entertainment, Inc., of Davie, Florida, MD Media, Inc., of Bingham Farms, Michigan, Pure Marketing Solutions, LLC, of Tampa, Florida, TJ Web Productions, LLC, of Tampa, Florida, and BangBros.com, Inc., RK Netmedia, Inc., and OX Ideas, Inc., LLC, of Miami, Florida entered into stipulated consent decrees. Impulse Media Group, Inc. of Seattle, Washington, represented by CarpeLaw PLLC, defended the case brought against it.

The Department of Justice asserted that the CAN-SPAM statute imposed strict liability on producers such as Impulse Media for the actions of its non-agent, independent-contractor affiliates. However, the two courts to consider that argument rejected the DOJ's contention. In March 2008 the remaining defendant, Impulse Media Group, went to trial. At trial, it was determined that IMG's Affiliate Agreement specifically prohibited spam bulk-email and that if an affiliate violated that agreement, it would be terminated from the program. In fact, several affiliates had been terminated for that very reason. After a 2½ day trial, the jury retired to determine whether Impulse Media should be held liable for the bad acts of its affiliates. Three and one-half hours later, the jury returned with a verdict that IMG was not liable and that the emails were the fault of the affiliates.

In March 2006, the FTC obtained what was then its largest settlement to date—a $900,000 consent decree against Jumpstart Technologies, LLC for numerous alleged violations of the CAN-SPAM act. However, the FTC has never prevailed at trial with their theory of strict liability.

In 2024, security camera company Verkada agreed to pay a $2.95 million civil penalty over its marketing emails, which the FTC described as the largest penalty it had obtained for a CAN-SPAM violation.

Each email that violates the act can draw a civil penalty of up to US$53,088. The FTC adjusts the cap for inflation each year; it was US$16,000 until August 2016, and the 2025 amount remained in effect for 2026 after that year's adjustment was cancelled.

== See also ==
- Communications Act of 1934 (Pub. L. 73–416)
- Do-Not-Call Implementation Act of 2003 (Pub. L. 108–10 (text) (PDF))
- Email spam
- General Data Protection Regulation
- Junk Fax Prevention Act of 2005 (Pub. L. 109–21 (text) (PDF))
- Spamming
- Suppression list
- Email spam legislation by country
