= Email marketing =

Act of sending a commercial message using email

Email marketing is the act of sending a commercial message, typically to a group of people, using email. In its broadest sense, advertising or soliciting business through email to people with an existing customer relationship could be considered email marketing. It involves using email to send advertisements, request business, or solicit sales or donations. The term usually refers to sending email messages with the purpose of enhancing a merchant's relationship with current or previous customers, encouraging customer loyalty and repeat business, acquiring new customers or convincing current customers to purchase something immediately, and sharing third-party ads.

== History ==
Email marketing has evolved alongside technological growth in the 21st century. Before this growth, when emails were novelties to most customers, email marketing was not as effective. In 1978, Gary Thuerk of Digital Equipment Corporation (DEC) sent out the first mass email to approximately 400 potential clients via the Advanced Research Projects Agency Network (ARPANET). He claimed that this resulted in $13 million worth of sales of DEC products, and highlighted the potential of marketing through mass emails.

== Types ==
Email marketing can be carried out through different types of emails:

=== Transactional emails ===
Transactional emails are usually triggered based on a customer's action with a company. To be qualified as transactional or relationship messages, these communications' primary purpose must be "to facilitate, complete or confirm a commercial transaction that the recipient has previously agreed to enter into with the sender" along with a few other narrow definitions of transactional messaging. Triggered transactional messages include dropped basket messages, password reset emails, purchase or order confirmation emails, order status emails, reorder emails, and email receipts.

The primary purpose of a transactional email is to convey information regarding the action that triggered it. But, due to their high open rates (51.3% compared to 36.6% for email newsletters), transactional emails are an opportunity to introduce or extend the email relationship with customers or subscribers; to anticipate and answer questions; or to cross-sell or up-sell products or services.

=== Direct emails ===
Direct email involves sending an email solely to communicate a promotional message (for example, a special offer or a product catalog). Companies usually collect a list of customer or prospect email addresses to send direct promotional messages to, or they rent a list of email addresses from service companies.

== Comparison to traditional mail ==
There are both advantages and disadvantages to using email marketing in comparison to traditional advertising mail.

=== Advantages ===
Email marketing is popular with companies for several reasons:

- Email marketing is significantly cheaper and faster than traditional mail, mainly because with email, most of the cost falls on the recipient.
- Email marketing platforms provide detailed analytics, allowing businesses to track open rates, click-through rates, and other important metrics to evaluate campaign performance.
- Automation tools make it easier to schedule and send emails at specific times or based on user actions, saving time and effort.
- Businesses and organizations who send a high volume of emails can use an ESP (email service provider) to gather information about the behavior of the recipients. The insights provided by consumer response to email marketing help businesses and organizations understand and make use of consumer behavior.
- Almost half of American Internet users check or send email on a typical day, with emails delivered between 1 am and 5 am local time outperforming those sent at other times in open and click rates.

=== Disadvantages ===
- As of mid-2016 email deliverability is still an issue for legitimate marketers. According to the report, legitimate email servers averaged a delivery rate of 73% in the U.S.; six percent were filtered as spam, and 22% were missing. This lags behind other countries: Australia delivers at 90%, Canada at 89%, Britain at 88%, France at 84%, Germany at 80% and Brazil at 79%.
- Companies considering the use of an email marketing program must make sure that their program does not violate spam laws such as the United States' Controlling the Assault of Non-Solicited Pornography and Marketing Act (CAN-SPAM), the European Privacy and Electronic Communications Regulations 2003, or their Internet service provider's acceptable use policy.
- An overwhelming amount of commercial email or untargeted emails can be irritating to consumers. This irritation can lead to consumers unsubscribing from all messages or building a negative brand association. Untargeted emails lead to low click through rate, hindering marketing campaign performance.

== Opt-in email advertising ==
Opt-in email advertising, or permission marketing, is advertising via email whereby the recipient of the advertisement has consented to receive it.

A common example of permission marketing is a newsletter sent to an advertising firm's customers. Such newsletters inform customers of upcoming events or promotions, or new products. In this type of advertising, a company that wants to send a newsletter to their customers may ask them at the point of purchase if they would like to receive the newsletter.

With a foundation of opted-in contact information stored in their database, marketers can send out promotional materials automatically using autoresponders—known as drip marketing. They can also segment their promotions to specific market segments.

== Legal requirements ==
=== Australia ===
The Australian Spam Act 2003 is enforced by the Australian Communications and Media Authority, widely known as "ACMA". The act defines the term unsolicited electronic messages, states how unsubscribe functions must work for commercial messages, and gives other key information. Fines range with three fines of AU$110,000 being issued to Virgin Blue Airlines (2011), Tiger Airways Holdings Limited (2012) and Cellar master Wines Pty Limited (2013).

=== Canada ===
The "Canada Anti-Spam Law" (CASL) went into effect on July 1, 2014. CASL requires an explicit or implicit opt-in from users, and the maximum fines for noncompliance are CA$1 million for individuals and $10 million for businesses.

=== European Union and UK ===
In 2002 the European Union (EU) introduced the Directive on Privacy and Electronic Communications. Article 13 of the Directive prohibits the use of personal email addresses for marketing purposes. The Directive establishes the opt-in regime, where unsolicited emails may be sent only with the prior agreement of the recipient; this does not apply to business email addresses. The UK gives sole traders and members of unincorporated partnerships the same protection as private individuals.

The directive has since been incorporated into the laws of member states. In the UK it is covered under the Privacy and Electronic Communications (EC Directive) Regulations 2003 and applies to all organizations that send out marketing by some form of electronic communication.

The GDPR in 2018 imposed "a number of new requirements on companies that collect, store and process personal data from EU users, which impacts email marketers" - in particular, users' right to access information held about them; and the right to have all such information deleted at their request.

=== United States ===
The CAN-SPAM Act of 2003 was passed by Congress as a direct response to the growing number of complaints over spam emails. Congress determined that the US government was showing an increased interest in the regulation of commercial electronic mail nationally, that those who send commercial emails should not mislead recipients over the source or content of them, and that all recipients of such emails have a right to decline them. The act authorizes a US$16,000 penalty per violation for spamming each individual recipient. However, it does not ban spam emailing outright, but imposes laws on using deceptive marketing methods through headings which are "materially false or misleading". In addition, there are conditions that email marketers must meet in terms of their format, their content and labeling. As a result, many commercial email marketers within the United States utilize a service or special software to ensure compliance with the act. A variety of older systems exist that do not ensure compliance with the act. To comply with the act's regulation of commercial email, services also typically require users to authenticate their return address and include a valid physical address, provide a one-click unsubscribe feature, and prohibit importing lists of purchased addresses that may not have given valid permission.

In addition to satisfying legal requirements, email service providers (ESPs) began to help customers establish and manage their own email marketing campaigns. The service providers supply email templates and general best practices, as well as methods for handling subscriptions and cancellations automatically. Some ESPs will provide insight and assistance with deliverability issues for major email providers. They also provide statistics about the number of messages received and opened, and whether the recipients clicked on any links within the messages.

The CAN-SPAM Act was updated with some new regulations including a no-fee provision for opting out, further definition of "sender", post office or private mail boxes count as a "valid physical postal address" and definition of "person". These new provisions went into effect on July 7, 2008.

== See also ==
- CAUCE – Coalition Against Unsolicited Commercial Email
- Customer engagement
- Suppression list
- Email spam - Unsolicited email marketing
- Cold email
