= Conversion marketing =

Electronic commerce marketing technique

Example Conversion Funnel
Saw the advertisement	100%
Clicked the advertisement	30%
Bought the product	6%

In electronic commerce, conversion marketing is a marketing technique aimed at increasing conversions—that is, turning site visitors into paying customers.

Conversion marketing addresses low online conversion rates by improving overall customer experience.

== Overview ==
By focusing on elements such as site usability, support channels, and overall digital experience, conversion marketing is generally considered a long-term strategic investment rather than a short-term fix. Conversion marketing strategies prioritize optimizing existing traffic rather than simply generating more visitors.

This approach includes proactive use of real-time analytics to identify signs of visitor hesitation or intent to abandon a site. In response, targeted messaging, interface enhancements, and personalized content are deployed to guide users, highlight value propositions, and increase the likelihood of conversion. Post-sale, marketers may continue engagement through support services or re-engagement campaigns to strengthen customer retention.

Conversion marketing spans the full customer lifecycle, using integrated tools to support transitions between each phase—from initial interest to repeat purchase.

Conversion marketing efforts are typically evaluated based on the conversion rate, which represents the percentage of visitors who complete a desired action—such as making a purchase, signing up for a newsletter, or submitting a form.

== Conversion rate ==
The conversion rate is the proportion of visitors to a website who take action to go beyond a casual content view or website visit, as a result of subtle or direct requests from marketers, advertisers, and content creators.

$$\mathrm{Conversion\ rate} = \frac{\mathrm{Number\ of\ Goal \ Achievements}}{\mathrm{Visitors}}$$

Successful conversions are defined differently by individual marketers, advertisers, and content creators. For online retailers, for example, a successful conversion may be defined as the sale of a product to a consumer whose interest in the item was initially sparked by clicking a banner advertisement. For content creators, a successful conversion may refer to a membership registration, newsletter subscription, software download, or other activity.

== Common conversion marketing services ==
Recommendations
Behavioral analysis that identifies products and content relevant to the customer's perceived intent.
Targeted offers
Targeting attempts to fit the right promotion with the right customer based upon behavioral and demographic information.
Ratings and reviews
Using user-generated ratings and reviews to increase conversion rates, capture feedback, and engender visitor trust.
Email personalization
Email with embedded recommendations and chat that are tailored personally to the recipient.
Chat
As consumers tend to abandon sites after only three clicks, attempts to use proactive chat, reactive chat, exit chat, and click-to-call to convert consumers quickly.
Click-to-call
Supports cross-channel conversion without losing the context of the conversation when visitors move from the website to the phone.
Call to action (marketing)
A statement designed to get an immediate response from the person reading or hearing it.
Cobrowsing
A tool used by support agents to assist customers during an online transaction.
Voice of the customer
Feedback about products, services, and online experiences captured through structured and unstructured data.
Automated guides
Predetermined steps that help customers better understand product features and assist with selection.
Retargeting
Identifies visitors interested in particular products or services based on past site activity and delivers targeted advertising accordingly.

== Methods of increasing conversion rate ==
The process of improving the conversion rate is called conversion rate optimization. However, different sites may consider a "conversion" to be a result other than a sale. Say a customer were to abandon an online shopping cart. The company could market a special offer, like free shipping, to convert the visitor into a paying customer. A company may also try to recover the customer through an online engagement method, such as proactive chat, to attempt to assist the customer through the purchase process.

Methods to improve conversion include:

- Applying Attention, Interest, Desire, Action (AIDA) principles throughout the conversion funnel
- Building credibility with trust signals and strong site design
- Simplifying navigation to reduce user friction
- Focusing content around targeted conversion goals
- Removing outdated or irrelevant information
- Enhancing usability
- Offering self-service knowledge bases
- Providing live support tools (chat, co-browsing)
- Enabling customer reviews
- Tracking objections and usability patterns
- Defining and monitoring key performance metrics
- Regularly optimizing based on analytics
- Highlighting clear offers (e.g., discounts or add-ons)

== See also ==
- Customer intelligence
- Win–loss analytics
