= Attentive (company) =

Mobile marketing platform

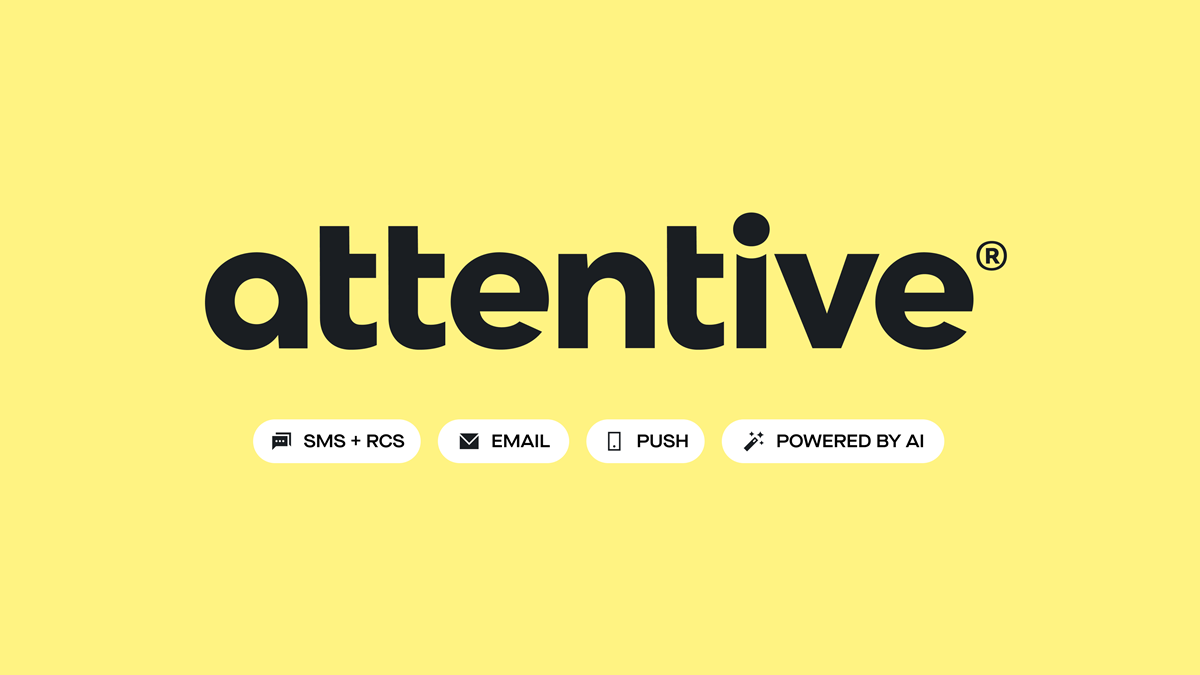
- Industry: Mobile Marketing, AI, SMS, SaaS
- Founded: 2016
- Founder: Brian Long, Andrew Jones
- Headquarters: New York, NY
- Key people: Amit Jhawar (CEO); Keri McGhee (CMO); Antonio Silveira (CTO)
- Products: Marketing automation, AI-powered SMS and email, Rich Communications Services
- Number of employees: 1,000+ (2025)
- Website: www.attentive.com

Attentive (also known as Attentive Mobile) is an American company that sells a mobile marketing software service. Their customer engagement software is used by more than 8,000 businesses for multichannel marketing and interacting with customers through email, SMS, push notifications, and RCS. The company is based in New York City, with offices in San Francisco, CA; London, England; and Sydney, AUS.

== History ==
Attentive was founded by Brian Long and Andrew Jones, who previously founded TapCommerce, a mobile app advertising startup acquired by Twitter. In September 2020, Attentive closed a $230 million Series D funding round led by Coatue Management, giving it a $2.2 billion valuation. In March 2021, the company raised an additional $470 million in a Series E funding round.

In 2020, Attentive was on a list from CB Insights and Fast Company of 50 future "unicorns" (companies that are projected to eventually be valued over $1 billion). The company was named one of Deloitte Technology Fast 500 winners in 2021, 2022, 2023, and 2024.

In June 2023, Amit Jhawar was named CEO after serving as president since January 2021. In November 2023, Attentive said it processed messaging campaigns that generated $1.8 billion in online sales for its customers during Cyber Week. Attentive had considered holding an initial public offering (IPO) in 2024, but in late 2023 they decided to postpone it.

A report in 2023 said that the company was "nearing profitability". In January 2025, the company reported reaching $500 million in annual recurring revenue in 2024. Competitors include Klaviyo, Braze, and other marketing automation services.

== See also ==
- Digital marketing
- Online marketing platform
- Real-time marketing
