= Salesforce Marketing Cloud =

Digital marketing automation provider

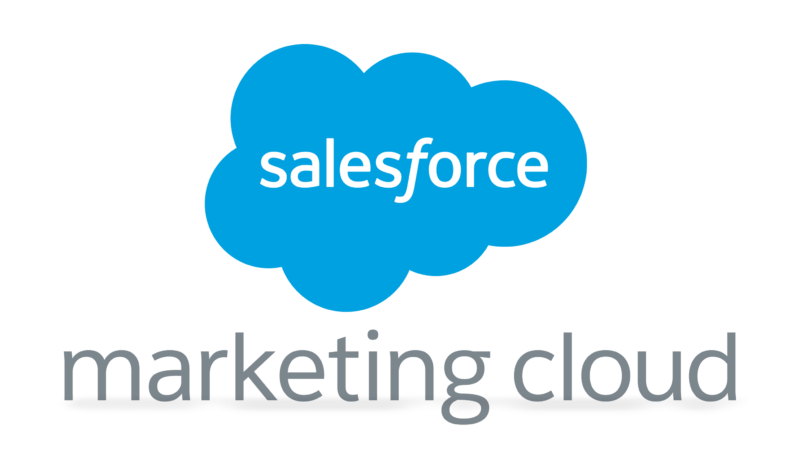
- Industry: Marketing automation
- Founded: Indianapolis, Indiana; December 15, 2000
- Founder: Peter McCormick, Scott Dorsey and Chris Baggott
- Headquarters: Indianapolis, Indiana
- Number of locations: 14
- Area served: Worldwide
- Key people: Adam Blitzer, GM & EVP
- Revenue: $292.3 million (2012)
- Number of employees: 1,800 (2013)
- Parent: Salesforce
- Website: MarketingCloud.com

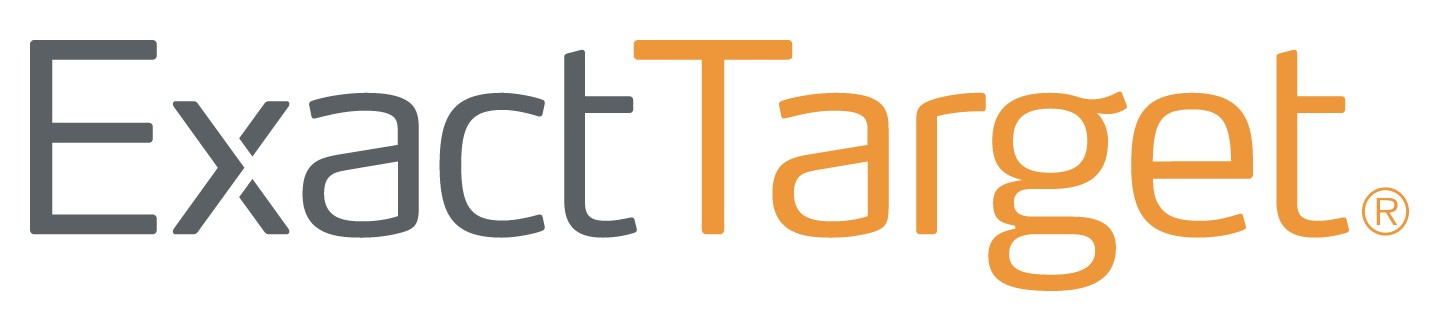
ExactTarget logo

Salesforce Marketing Cloud is a digital marketing automation and analytics software and services platform developed by Salesforce. It was founded in 2000 under the name ExactTarget. The company filed for an IPO in 2007, but withdrew its filing two years later and raised $145 million in funding.

It acquired CoTweet, Pardot, iGoDigital and Keymail Marketing. In 2012, it raised $161.5 million in an initial public offering, before being acquired by Salesforce for $2.5 billion in 2013. ExactTarget was renamed Salesforce Marketing Cloud in 2014 after its acquisition by Salesforce.

== Corporate history ==
Salesforce Marketing Cloud was founded under the name ExactTarget in late 2000 by Scott Dorsey, Chris Baggott, and Peter McCormick with $200,000 in financing. Joanna Milliken joined ExactTarget as the first employee in 2001. It raised $10.5 million in funding from Insight Venture Partners in 2004. The firm grew from $11.5 million in its second year of operations to $41.1 million in 2006, which was its first profitable year.

In December 2007, ExactTarget filed an intent for an initial public offering with the Securities and Exchange Commission, but withdrew its filing in May 2009. Instead, it announced that $70 million in venture funding had been raised for international expansion, which was followed by another $75 million round later that year.

An office was established in London with the acquisition of a UK-based ExactTarget reseller, Keymail Marketing, in September 2009. The company hired 200 additional employees. In 2010, ExactTarget acquired CoTweet, a company founded in 2008 that develops and markets software for managing multiple Twitter accounts.

ExactTarget went public in March 2012 and raised $161.5 million in funding on the New York Stock Exchange. In late 2012, it acquired a marketing automation vendor, Pardot, for $96 million, and the developers of a product recommendation engine, iGoDigital, for $21 million.

In 2012, its revenues grew 40 percent over the preceding year. The following June, ExactTarget was acquired by Salesforce for $2.5 billion. A few months later, salesforce.com said it was laying off 200 staff due to overlaps after the ExactTarget acquisition. That September at the ExactTarget Connections conference, salesforce.com said it was integrating ExactTarget into a new division called Salesforce ExactTarget Marketing Cloud.

In May 2014, Scott Dorsey stepped down as CEO of ExactTarget and was replaced by Scott McCorkle. The company was renamed in October 2014 to "Salesforce Marketing Cloud", removing "ExactTarget" from its name, as part of its integration with Salesforce.

In 2019, Salesforce moved its Marketing Cloud to Microsoft Azure.

In 2020, the company launched Salesforce Customer 360 Audiences, a customer data platform designed to unify customer profiles and improve targeted marketing.

In 2021, Salesforce introduced enhancements to Interaction Studio for real-time personalization and expanded messaging capabilities, including WhatsApp integration.

In 2022, Salesforce rebranded several Marketing Cloud products: Interaction Studio became Marketing Cloud Personalization, Datorama became Marketing Cloud Intelligence, and Pardot became Marketing Cloud Account Engagement.

In 2023, the company launched Einstein GPT for Marketing, integrated WhatsApp for conversational campaigns, and deepened connections with Salesforce Data Cloud for real-time customer journey activation.

== Software and services ==
Salesforce Marketing Cloud develops marketing automation and analytics software for email, mobile, social and online marketing. It also offers consulting and implementation services. The software is sold primarily on a multi-year subscription basis. The price of the subscription is based on what features are enabled, the number of users and level of customer service.

The software's Interactive Marketing Hub was released in 2010, when the software's user interface was re-done. It serves as the software's primary user interface for managing communications and content through different media. The Salesforce Marketing Cloud software is offered in a hosted, online subscription model. The company owns the CoTweet, Pardot, and iGoDigital tools. Its mobile features, as well as many of its workflow and collaboration tools, were released in July 2013.

Salesforce Marketing Cloud was founded as an email marketing vendor. Its email management software maintains mailing lists and schedules and modifies email messages based on what recipients read, click-on or forward.

In September 2014 the company introduced the Journey Builder for Apps, which is intended to create customer lifecycle maps of mobile app users. That month, at the September 2014 ExactTarget Connections conference, they announced numerous updates to their software. This included integration with software products owned by Salesforce.com, such as Buddy Media and Social Studio, as well as improvements to workflow and content management tools.

In November 2014 the company released a new version of Social Studio. This release expanded Social Studio beyond Salesforce's Marketing Cloud, where it started, integrating it with the Service Cloud and the Sales Cloud. This enabled sending leads over to the Sales Cloud — the salesperson can see the full context of the company's social media interactions with the lead.

== Operations ==
As of December 2012, about two thirds of ExactTarget's 1,500 employees were located in Indianapolis.

The company hosts an annual user conference called Salesforce Connections, previously the ExactTarget Connections Event. The first Connections event in 2007 attracted 500 attendees, and it has since grown into one of the largest conferences on digital marketing.

The event was located in Indianapolis from 2007 until 2014, New York City in 2015, and Atlanta in 2016. It did not occur in 2017 as it was merged with world tours, and was brought back in Chicago in 2018. As of April 28, 2016 the conference was renamed Salesforce Connections. It merged with Salesforce World Tour in 2017.
