= Klaviyo =

American marketing automation platform and email marketing service

Klaviyo, Inc.
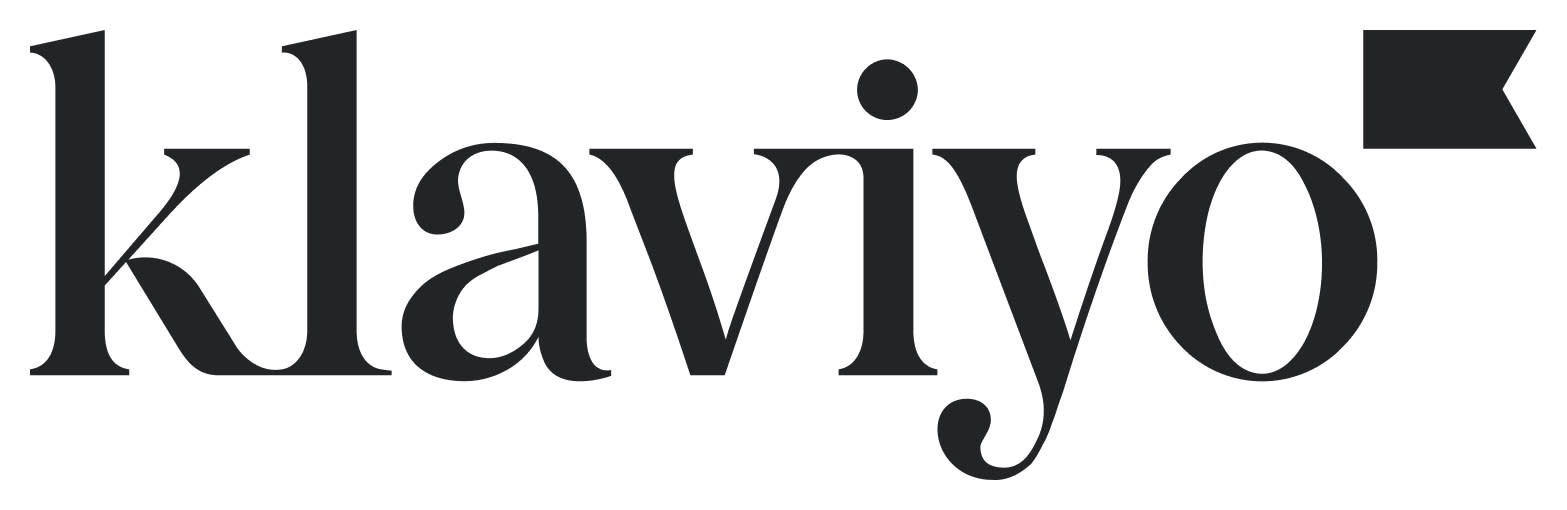

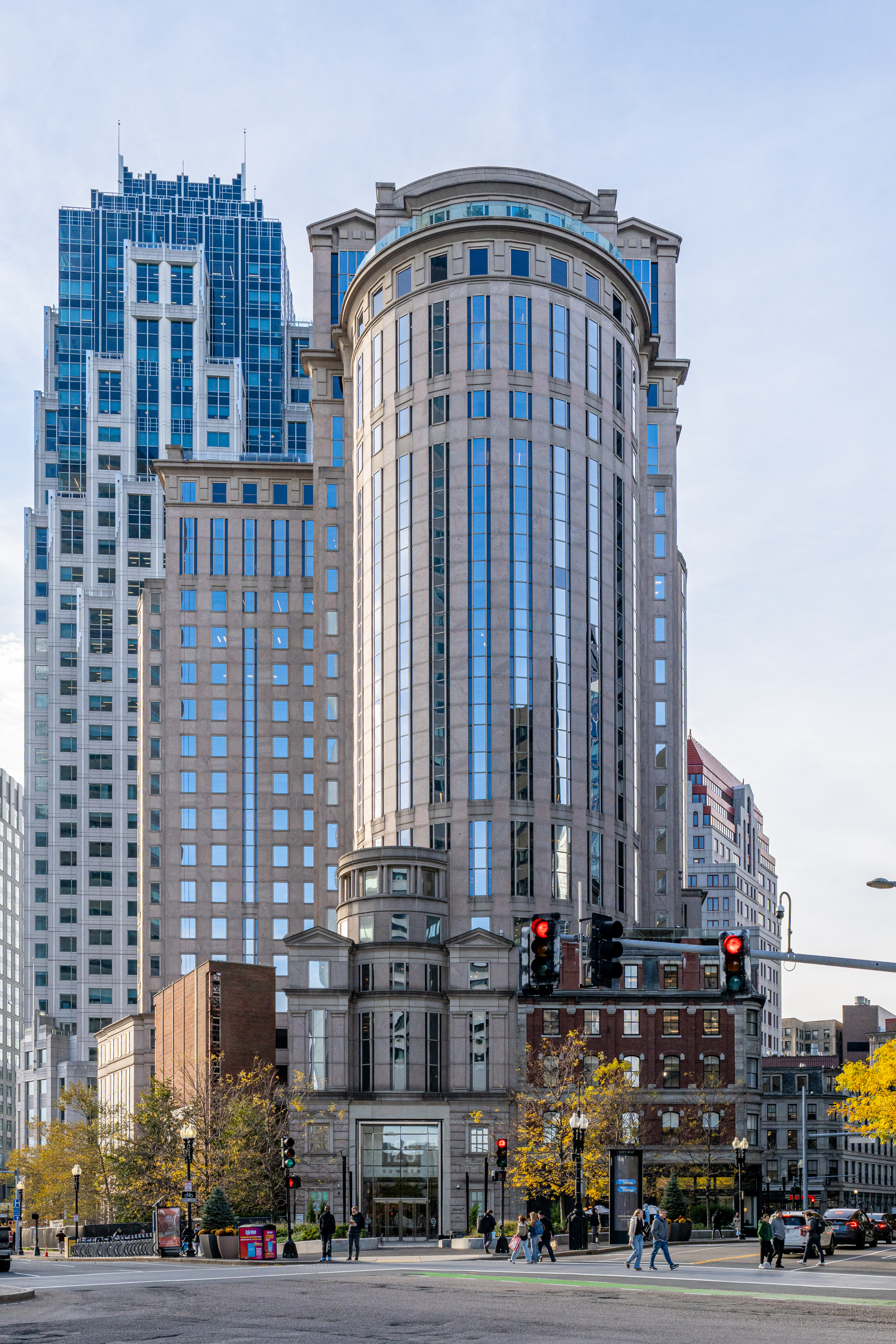
- Headquarters in Boston (2026)
- Type: Public
- Traded as: NYSE: KVYO
- Industry: Marketing Automation
- Founded: 2012; 14 years ago
- Founders: Andrew Bialecki; Ed Hallen
- Headquarters: Boston, Massachusetts, United States
- Area served: Worldwide
- Key people: Andrew Bialecki (CEO)
- Products: email marketing, sms marketing, product reviews, CDP, CRM
- Revenue: ▲US$1.234 billion (2025)
- Operating income: ▼ −US$67.8 million (2025)
- Net income: ▼ −US$31.8 million (2025)
- Total assets: ▲US$1.58 billion (2025)
- Total equity: ▲US$1.197 billion (2025)
- Owners: Andrew Bialecki (38%); Summit Partners (23%); Ed Hallen (14%); Shopify (11%)
- Number of employees: 2,368 (2025)
- Website: klaviyo.com

Klaviyo is an international SaaS technology company headquartered in Boston, Massachusetts, that provides an omnichannel, customer relationship management (CRM) platform with agentic AI features. The platform is used by B2C brands for email marketing, SMS marketing, WhatsApp business management, mobile push notifications, and social media marketing, as well as customer service automation and data management.

A majority of the approximately 196,000 merchants who use Klaviyo's software are e-commerce sellers who host their offerings on Shopify, Woocommerce and Prestashop.

== History ==
The company was founded in 2013 by Andrew Bialecki and Ed Hallen. Both Bialecki and Hallen had previously worked at Applied Predictive Technologies.

In August 2022, e-commerce company Shopify announced it was making Klaviyo the recommended email solution partner for its Shopify Plus merchant platform, with a US$100,000,000 strategic investment into the company.

In November 2022, Klaviyo announced its first acquisition, code development firm Napkin.io.

In April 2023, Klaviyo filed for an initial public offering (IPO) for a listing at the New York Stock Exchange. In September, the company went public, raising $576 million in the IPO at a $9.2 billion valuation.

In June 2023, Klaviyo partnered with e-commerce platform Prestashop with the launch of Prestashop Automation with Klaviyo

In 2023, Klaviyo first introduced AI-powered features, which as of 2025 include Marketing Agent, which automates campaign planning and optimization, and Customer Agent, which provides 24/7 customer service automation. The launches reflected the company's expansion from a marketing automation platform toward an AI-powered B2C CRM platform integrating customer data, automation, and omnichannel engagement.

In 2024, the Klaviyo Marketing Platform was localised into six non-English languages, French, German, Spanish, Italian, Korean and Brazilian Portuguese. In 2025 the platform was further localised into Dutch, Polish, Mexican Spanish and Swedish.

In August 2025, Klaviyo announced it had acquired Gatsby, a customer engagement platform. The acquisition expands the Klaviyo platform's capabilities to include social media marketing.

== Software and services ==
The Klaviyo platform primarily integrates with e-commerce platforms, such as Shopify, Magento, BigCommerce, WooCommerce, Wix, Salesforce, and Square. In 2026 Klaviyo's signup form was found on 109 of 4,885 Inc. 5000 company homepages, ahead of Mailchimp's 91.

In addition to its e-commerce platform integrations, users can integrate other tools from their tech stacks like Zendesk, Postscript, Meta Ads, Google Ads, Square, Albato, Zapier, Aftership, Amazon Buy with Prime, Big Commerce, Canva, Zoho and Okendo and Salesforce, directly to Klaviyo, or use an API solution when an integration needs to be customized.

== See also ==
- Customer data platform
- Customer relationship management
- Digital marketing
- E-commerce
- Email marketing
- Marketing automation
- Mobile marketing
- Online marketing platform
- Real-time marketing
- Social media marketing
