= Telephone recording =

Telephone recording may refer to:

- Wiretapping, monitoring of telephone and Internet-based conversations by a third party
- Call-recording software, records telephone conversations over PSTN or VoIP in a digital audio file format
- Call tracking software, records information about incoming telephone calls, and, in some regions, the conversation
- Call logging, the collection, evaluation, and reporting of technical and statistical data about telephone calls
- Call detail record, a data record of the details of a telephone call or other telecommunications transactions
