= Demand generation =

Marketing to create demand for a product

Demand generation is the focus of targeted marketing programs to drive awareness and interest in a company's products and/or services. Commonly used in business-to-business, business-to-government, or longer business-to-consumer sales cycles, demand generation involves multiple areas of marketing and is really the marriage of marketing programs coupled with a structured sales process.

There are multiple components of a stepped demand generation process that vary based on the size and complexity of a sale. These components include, among other things: building awareness, positioning relevance, supporting validation and mitigating customer evaluation. Useful demand generation methodologies include AIDA (attract Attention, maintain Interest, create Desire, get Action), developed by E. St. Elmo Lewis, an American advertising advocate.

== Building awareness ==
Demand generation is a holistic approach to marketing and sales cohesion within the company. Through various nurture campaigns and marketing approaches, demand generation efforts aim to both create a long-term relationship between a brand and a potential buyer, and at the same time gauge and develop a prospect's purchasing interest in said brand's products/services. Building brand or product/service awareness is a vital component in the demand generation process, and often takes a continued effort and involves multiple facets of marketing.

Advanced demand generation programs typically rely on some form of proactive lead generation activities supported by more traditional market programs and processes. This is because demand generation programs tend to assume that prospective customers are aware that they have a need or problem, and are attempting to solve it when they search for solutions. If the prospect is unaware (consciously or, at least, subconsciously) that they have the problem, then demand generation may not be effective—thus the need for adjunct lead generation activities.

== Facilitating discovery ==
The second key area of focus for a marketer focused on demand generation is ensuring that when a prospect decides to seek a vendor to provide a solution in a given solution category, they discover the vendor that the marketer serves. This is again accomplished with a variety of techniques and tools, often overlapping with the tools used for creating awareness of the category, but with a different emphasis.

- Search engine advertising – the purchase of advertisements on search engines to appear when keywords on the specific category, or known competitors in the solution space, are searched for.
- Search engine optimization – the use of a variety of techniques to increase a web site’s natural position in search engine results when keywords on the specific category, or known competitors in the solution space, are searched for
- Webinars or seminars – online web based seminars, or in person seminars to allow prospective buyers to discover and understand a vendor’s solution, how it can be used, and who else is using it, in detail
- Demonstrations and free trials – easily accessed, often online, tools for demonstrating a solution or accessing a time-limited or feature-constrained trial version to assist prospective buyers in discovering the solution and its fit with their need

Again, in this phase of the demand generation process, many approaches and tools are used and this list is only a selection of the more common approaches.

== Guiding solution validation ==
Often confused with demand generation is the lead process itself. Converting demand into sales is a totally separate task. Many companies, however, will call themselves demand generation organizations when they are really lead generating.

This later phase of the buying process involves validating that a selected vendor will meet specified requirements, coming to an agreement with the vendor on costs, contract terms, support and services, and finalizing the purchase process.

This often involves coordinating the involvement of other organizational and extra-organizational resources such as sales representatives and reference clients.

- Marketing tools as detailed above – trials, demonstrations, whitepapers, and seminars designed for a more detailed evaluation and validation of the solution in question
- Reference management – cultivation, management, and selection of client references willing to provide a potential purchaser with the perspective of a current (or past) client.
- Sales involvement – coordination of the right sales resource to interact with the prospect to navigate the final stages of the buying process including contract negotiation, legal terms and conditions, and sign off.

The coordination of sales involvement, the selection of the right sales resource, and the timing of the involvement can be difficult to determine. The scoring, ranking, and routing of leads into sales is a sufficiently deep topic to warrant further exploration.

=== Sales involvement ===
The involvement of sales professionals in the solution validation process involves three main aspects. These are the same whether inside sales or field sales professionals are being involved.

- Lead scoring – understanding which prospective buyers warrant being contacted by a sales professional. Lead scoring involves scoring two distinct aspects of the prospect; whether he or she is qualified to be a buyer, and whether he or she is interested in being a buyer. The former looks at explicit information such as title, industry, and revenues to understand whether that individual is able to make a buying decision, while the latter examines implicit information such as recent online activity and marketing response in order to determine whether the individual is currently interested in making a buying decision. Many Marketers will take a simple approach by labeling lead scoring criteria on two foundations: behavioral scoring and demographic scoring.
- Lead ranking – based on the scoring of leads, leads can be assigned ranks based on the business process sales should follow in interacting with the leads. For example, if explicit scoring leads to a 1, 2, or 3 ranking on how qualified the lead is, while implicit scoring leads to an A, B, or C ranking on how interested the lead is, a follow-up process may have 1A leads contacted within 24 hours, 1B leads contacted by a field sales professional within 72 hours, while 1C, 2A, and 2B leads are contacted by an inside sales professional and 2C and all leads ranked as a 3 are not contacted.
- Lead routing – once a business process is determined, a lead routing process determines which lead should be connected with which salesperson, based on geographic territory, industry, company size, or any other factor. Often this involves management of the notification of the salesperson and monitoring of the time taken to follow up.

== Related disciplines ==
In order to effectively manage and optimize the required communication, response, and lead management processes outlined above, marketers focused on demand generation must become proficient at two other related disciplines

- Data management – the centralization, removal of duplicates, profiling, appending, normalizing and cleansing of marketing data so that it can be effectively used to personalize communications, define target lists and segments, score leads, and route leads to sales.
- Marketing analytics – the analysis of the effectiveness of marketing efforts, from individual tactics such as email communications or landing pages through to overall campaign performance.

== See also ==
- Artificial demand
- Demand chain
- Digital marketing
- Digital marketing engineer
- Marketing automation
- Voice-based marketing automation
