= Voice-based marketing automation =

Software platforms

Voice-based marketing automation (VBMA) refers to software platforms designed for marketing, sales, and support departments to measure, manage, and automate their phone conversations. Marketing departments, sales teams, and support agents use VBMA to initiate, manage, monitor, track, route, record, and report on sales and support phone conversations.

VBMA encompasses a wide range of automation and analytics tools. It is used as a standalone solution and as a way to complement the functionality found in traditional marketing automation software.

== Comparison to marketing automation ==
Activity	Marketing Automation	Voice-Based Marketing Automation
Lead Generation	Uses emails and web forms to generate web leads	Uses voice broadcasts, phone surveys, and SMS texts to generate phone leads
Lead Tracking	Tracks email success, web downloads, and web site activity	Tracks voice broadcast success and inbound phone leads
Lead Scoring	Uses web forms to score web leads	Uses inbound IVR to score phone leads
Lead Routing	Routes web leads to sales	Routes phone leads to sales
Lead Nurturing	Uses emails to nurture leads	Uses voice broadcasts, phone surveys, and SMS texts to nurture leads
Lead Reporting	Generates real-time reports on web leads	Generates real-time reports on phone leads
CRM Integration	Shares data with CRM tools like Salesforce.com	Shares data with CRM tools like Salesforce.com

== Growth of voice-based marketing automation ==
Voice-based marketing automation platforms have emerged as an integrated solution in response to both the growth in mobile users, and mobile advertising. It is estimated that mobile search will generate 73 billion calls to businesses (up from 30 billion in 2013) and businesses are placing more value on phone calls as a lead source, as is evident from the estimated $64.6 billion spent annually on ads to generate phone calls. With Google's call-only ad type, businesses were able to generalize billions of calls through mobile search. In 2015, mobile search drove 48 percent of calls. Advances in call analytics have been made to provide businesses with deeper insights to measure and optimize inbound calls.

== Functionality ==
Voice-based marketing automation software consists of the following core pieces of functionality:

Call tracking
Enables marketers to tie incoming phone calls back to the specific marketing source (ad, keyword search, email, QR code, website, collateral, trade show, or other source) that originated them.
Hosted IVR (interactive voice response)
Is a cloud-based technology that allows a computer to interact with humans through the use of voice and DTMF tones input via a keypad. Inbound IVRs are used as auto-attendants to answer, qualify, and route callers to their desired area of the organization. They can also be used to process orders or provide basic information without involving a live operator. Outbound IVRs are also used in voice broadcast campaigns to conduct customer surveys, solicit and process orders, and more.
Voice broadcasting
Is a mass communication technique that broadcasts telephone messages to hundreds or thousands of call recipients at once. They are a means of automating appointment reminders, delivery confirmations, event promotions, reorders, accounts receivable collections, phone surveys, and more. Voice broadcasts delivered via voice-based marketing automation can be an audio recording, a text-to-speech message, or an IVR for handling recipient interaction. The system can also play different messages if a live person answers or if the call goes to voicemail.
Call routing and forwarding
Automatically passes inbound phone calls to a specific location, department, agent, or group of agents based on various criteria.
Call screening
Gives agents the option of accepting or declining calls based on a caller’s information.
Call transcription
Captures voice interactions by transcribing conversations, IVR responses, and voice messages.
Call recording
Automatically captures calls or portions of calls as audio files.
Agent panels
Appear on sales and support agents computer screens and display information on incoming calls, such as their names, phone numbers, the marketing source they are calling from, and CRM information.
Manager dashboards
Appear on the sales or support team manager’s computer screen and enable them to monitor agent activities.
Web form call triggering
Initiates a call to a company’s agent when a visitor on their website submits their phone number in a web form. If the agent accepts the call, the system calls the web site visitor and connects the two in conversation.
SMS messaging
Is a service where business can send text messages to their use base to generate and nurture leads, confirm appointments and deliveries, provide alerts, and other functions.
API integration
Is a protocol intended to be used as an interface by software components to communicate with each other.
Software analytics
Enabled software practitioners to perform data exploration and analysis to obtain insightful and actionable information for completing various tasks.

== How voice-based marketing automation is used ==
There are three types of groups who use voice-based marketing automation software:

Marketers
Use voice-based marketing automation to generate, track, qualify, filter, route, and report on inbound sales calls. They also use the call recording component to review sales and support calls.
Salespeople
Use voice-based marketing automation to capture and respond to phone leads. They often set up a virtual call center to manage, route, and record inbound sales calls. Sales teams also use the voice broadcasting and SMS messaging components to automate the communication of information and to process orders.
Support professionals
Use voice-based marketing automation to provide phone-based customer service using a virtual call center to handle support calls. The software enables agents to work from any location and receive and transfer calls using any phone type. Support teams often use the IVR technology component to answer incoming calls, provide answers to routine inquiries, conduct surveys, and route callers who need to speak to a live person to the correct agent or group of agents.

== See also ==
- Demand generation
- Lead scoring
- Call tracking
- Voice broadcasting
- Interactive voice response (IVR)
- SMS
