= Market system =

Process enabling individuals to offer and demand goods

A market system (or market ecosystem) is any systematic process enabling many market players to offer and demand: helping buyers and sellers interact and make deals. It is not just the price mechanism but the entire system of regulation, qualification, credentials, reputations and clearing that surrounds that mechanism and makes it operate in a social context. Some authors use the term "market system" to refer specifically to the free market system. This article focuses on the more general sense of the term according to which there are a variety of different market systems.

Market systems are different from voting systems. A market system relies on buyers and sellers being constantly involved and unequally enabled; in a voting system, candidates seek the support of voters on a less regular basis. In addition (a) buyers make decisions on their own behalves, whereas voters make decisions for collectives, (b) voters are usually fully aware of their participation in social decision-making, whereas buyers are often unaware of the secondary repercussions of their acts, (c) responsibility for making purchasing decisions is concentrated on the individual buyer, whereas responsibility for making collective decisions is divided, (d) different buying decisions at the same time are made under conditions of scarcity --- the selection of one thing precludes the selection of another, whereas different voting decisions are not --- one can vote for a president and a judge in the same election without one vote precluding the other, and (e) under ordinary conditions, a buyer is choosing to buy an actual good and is therefore never overruled in his choice, whereas it is the nature of voting that the voter is choosing among potential alternatives and may be overruled by other voters. However, the interactions between market and voting systems are an important aspect of political economy, and some argue they are hard to differentiate; for example, systems like cumulative voting and runoff voting involve a degree of market-like bargaining and trade-off, rather than simple statements of choice.

== Types ==
In economics, market forms are studied. These look at the impacts of a particular form on larger markets, rather than technical characteristics of how buyers and sellers interact.

Heavy reliance on many interacting market systems and different forms of markets is a feature of capitalism, and advocates of socialism often criticize markets and aim to substitute markets with economic planning to varying degrees. Competition is the regulatory mechanism of the market system. This article does not discuss the political impact of any particular system nor applications of a particular mechanism to any particular problem in real life. For more on specific types of real-life markets, see insurance markets, bond markets, energy markets, flea markets, debt markets, commercial markets, online auctions, media exchange markets, real estate market, each of which is explained in its own article with features of its application, referring to market systems as such if needed. One of the most important characteristics of a market economy, also called a free enterprise economy, is the role of a limited government.

== Protocols ==
The market itself provides a medium of exchange for the contracts and coupons and cash to seek prices relative to each other, and for those to be publicized. This publication of current prices is a key feature of market systems, and is often relevant far beyond the current groups of buyers and sellers, affecting others' supply and demand decisions, e.g. whether to produce more of a commodity whose price is now falling. Market systems are more abstract than their application to any one use, and typically a 'system' describes a protocol of offering or requesting things for sale. Well-known market systems that are used in many applications include:

- auctions - the most common, including:
  - Dutch auctions
  - reverse auctions
  - silent auctions
- rationing
- Administrative allocation (including the command economy of some states)
- regulated market (including most real-life examples as above)
- black market (the term 'black' indicating lack of regulation, or any trade, often illegal, operating in violation of official regulations)

The term 'laissez-faire' ("let alone") is sometimes used to describe some specific compromise between regulation and black market, resulting in the political struggle to define or exploit "free markets". This is not an easy matter to separate from other debates about the nature of capitalism. There is no such thing as a "free" market other than in the sense of a black market, and most free-market advocates favor at least some form of regulated market, e.g. to prevent outright fraud, theft, and retain some degree of credibility with the larger public. This political debate is out of the scope of this article, other than to note that the "free" market is usually a "less regulated" market, but not qualitatively different from other regulated markets, in any society with laws, and that what opponents of "free markets" usually seek is some kind of moral purchasing rather than pure rationing.

As this debate suggests, key debates over market systems relate to their accessibility, safety, fairness, and ability to guarantee clearance and closure of all transactions in a reasonable period of time.

== Importance of trust ==
The degree of trust in a political or economic authority (such as a bank or central bank) is often critical in determining the success of a market. A market system depends inherently on a stable money system to ensure that units of account and standards of deferred payment are uniform across all players—and to ensure that the balance of contracts due within that market system are accepted as a store of value, i.e. as "collateral" of the holder of the contract, which justifies "credit" from a lender of cash.

Banks, themselves, are often described in terms of markets, as "transducers of trust" between lenders (who deposit money) and borrowers (who take it out again). Trust in the bank to manage this process makes more economic activity possible. However, critics say, this trust is also quite easy to abuse, and has many times proven difficult to limit or control (see business cycle), resulting in 'runs on banks' and other such 'crises of trust' in 'the system'.

== Criticisms ==
In The Economics of Innocent Fraud, Economist John Kenneth Galbraith criticized the concept of the "market system" as nonsensical and as a weasel word intended to replace the term "capitalism", but which does not specify anything specific.

== Marketing System ==
Marketing System is a consistent pattern of provisioning relationships in society that exists between members of society including individuals, firms, communities and institutions. While marketing, in the sense of firm's micro marketing activities, can be the same across contexts, cultures, and nations, a marketing system is a unique market structure pertaining to a specific context (e.g. agricultural marketing systems in Africa). Marketing system is a differentiated subset of social system. Marketing system is a general term that represents how different patterns of the flows of goods/services from producers to consumers are culturally (uniquely) organised, whereas terms such as market system (a market based economic system of the West), horizontal marketing system (cooperation between two firms at the same level), and digital marketing system (a specific type of centralised channel distribution) represent its context-specific variations. Marketing systems are mostly researched within the discipline of macromarketing.

=== Definition ===
The notion of "aggregated marketing system" signifies all marketing practices at the societal level. Roger Layton defines a marketing system as "a network of individuals, groups and/or entities, embedded in a social matrix, linked directly or indirectly through sequential or shared participation in economic exchange, which jointly and/or collectively creates economic value with and for customers, through the offer of assortments of goods, services, experiences and ideas, that emerge in response to or anticipation of customer demand". Marketing systems can be rudimentary or complex, emergent or purposefully designed, spatio-temporal or virtual; these can also be aggregate, parallel, symbolic, dignity-based and chrematistics-driven. From the societal perspective, a marketing system represents a public good which can have value over and beyond goods/services it generates.

=== MAS theory ===
MAS (mechanism, action, structure) theory of marketing systems proposed by Layton focuses on social mechanisms, strategic action fields, and emergent marketing system structure to explicate potential sources and causes of marketing system's formation, adaptation, and evolution. Social mechanisms include cooperation, specialisation, and self-organisation, while strategic action fields comprise the action and practices of marketing system actors in their specific roles. Layton argues that marketing systems emerge as localised exchanges grow in scope and become stabilised while specialisation expands, and in addition, as key structures become formalised.

=== MSPG theory ===
MSPG (marketing systems as a public good) theory conceptualises a marketing system as a purposefully designed structure that resembles a "public good" in its features. According to this theory, the holistic design of a marketing system as a public good enables its structural elements (e.g. goods, value, exchanges and processes) to become meaningful. Hence, purposeful design precedes emergence.

=== Symbolism in Marketing Systems ===
Marketing systems are strongly driven by symbolism.

== See also ==
- The Economics of Innocent Fraud
- Capitalism
- Financial capital
- Free price system
- Market abolitionism
- Market economy
- Market forms
- Money
- Moral purchasing
- Risk
- Voting system
