= Bain Capital Ventures =

American venture capital division within Bain Capital

Bain Capital Ventures LLC
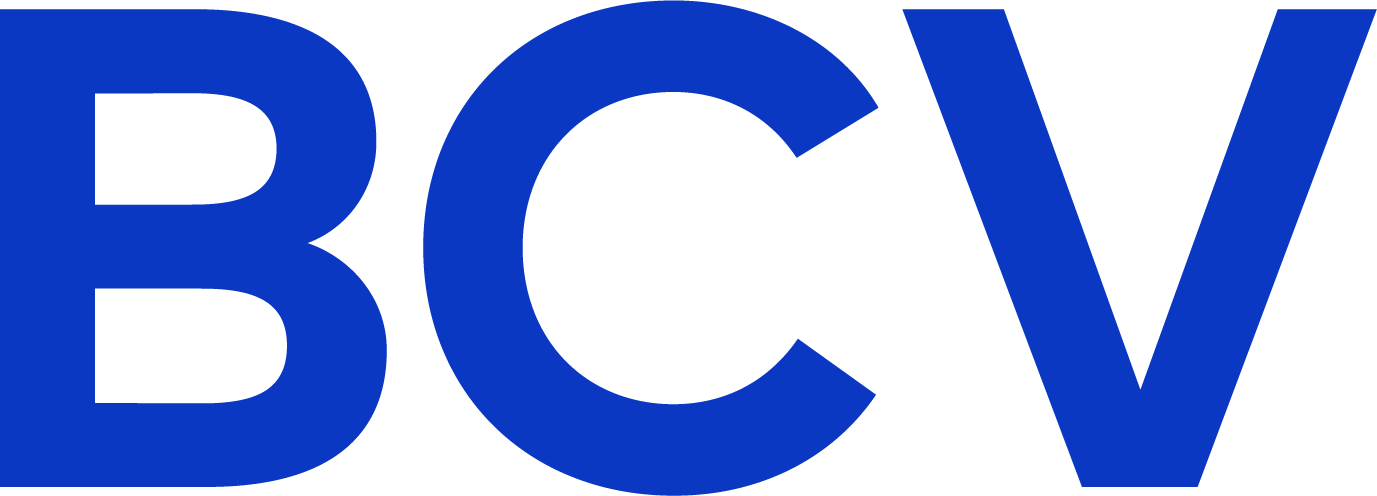
- Type: Limited liability company
- Industry: Financial services, Investment management
- Founded: 2001
- Headquarters: New York, New York, San Francisco, California, Palo Alto, California
- Key people: Partners: Ajay Agarwal, Scott Friend, Matt Harris, Aaref Hilaly, Sarah Hinkfuss, Merritt Hummer, Christina Melas-Kyriazi, Saanya Ojha, Enrique Salem, Slater Stich, Kevin Zhang
- Products: Venture capital
- AUM: $10 billion
- Number of employees: 30+
- Parent: Bain Capital
- Website: www.baincapitalventures.com

Previous logo

Bain Capital Ventures LLC (BCV) is the venture capital division of Bain Capital. It has approximately $10 billion of committed capital. The firm's early-stage investments have included Attentive, Bloomreach, Billtrust, Docusign, Flywire, LinkedIn, Justworks, Turbonomic, Rent the Runway, Twilio, Rapid7, and Redis. BCV has over 400 active portfolio companies, and has offices in New York City, Palo Alto, and San Francisco.

== Investments ==
Bain Capital Ventures has raised slightly over $10 billion of investor capital since 2001 across ten core investment funds and three co-investment funds. The firm is currently investing its tenth fund, Bain Capital Venture Fund X, which raised $1.4 billion from investors. The following is a summary of Bain Capital Venture's private equity funds raised from its inception through 2023:

| Fund | Vintage Year | Committed Capital ($m) |
|---|---|---|
| Bain Capital Venture Fund I | 2001 | $250 |
| Bain Capital Venture Fund II | 2005 | $250 |
| Bain Capital Venture Fund III | 2007 | $500 |
| Bain Capital Venture Fund IV | 2009 | $525 |
| Bain Capital Venture Fund V | 2012 | $660 |
| Bain Capital Venture Fund VI | 2014 | $650, $200 |
| Bain Capital Venture Fund VII | 2016 | $600 |
| Bain Capital Venture Fund VIII | 2019 | $650, $250 |
| Bain Capital Venture IX | 2021 | $950, $350 |
| Bain Capital Ventures Fund X | 2023 | $1440, $480 |

Some of the company's notable investments have included: Attentive, Bloomreach, Clari, Docusign, Flywire, LinkedIn, Moveworks, Rapid7, and Redis.

== Investments ==
Bain Capital Ventures works with seed, early and growth-stage investments. Its seed and early stage investments include Soona, Momento, Hightouch, and Zenlytic. Examples of growth stage investments include Docker, Tecton, GoCardless, Whop.com, Signifyd, and MaintainX and HYCU. It invested in the US unit of Japanese national company Seven-Eleven Japan by taking a stake in its US convenience business in case it sells it or lists it in the public markets.

=== Notable exits ===
- DocuSign: IPO valuation of $629 million in 2018
- LinkedIn: IPO valuation of $7.8 billion in 2011
- Twilio: IPO valuation of $150 million in 2016
- Rent the Runway: IPO valuation of $357 million in 2021
- Flywire: IPO valuation of $3.5 billion in 2021
- Avidxchange: IPO valuation of $4.6 billion in 2021
