= SiriusDecisions =

SiriusDecisions, Inc.
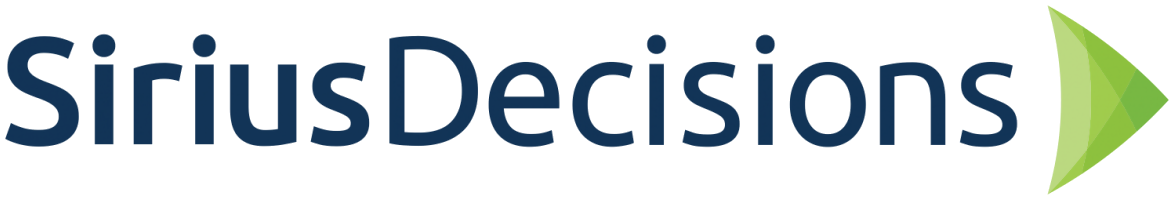
- Company type: Private
- Industry: Research
- Founded: 2001
- Founders: John Neeson and Richard Eldh
- Headquarters: Wilton, Connecticut, USA
- Key people: John Neeson (Managing Director); Richard Eldh (Managing Director); Tony Jaros (SVP of Research); Ally Motz (President and CEO, SiriusDecisions Canada)
- Number of employees: 150
- Website: SiriusDecisions.com

SiriusDecisions, Inc. was a global B2B research and advisory firm with headquarters in Wilton, Connecticut. The company provided advisory, consulting and learning services to help executives improve the performance of their sales, marketing, and product strategies.

SiriusDecisions developed the "Demand Waterfall" model, which is widely used by B2B companies to describe and measure their lead-to-revenue funnel.

SiriusDecisions clients included Adobe, IBM, GE, HP, Cisco; SAP; and Motorola. Forrester Research acquired the company in 2018.

== Company history ==
SiriusDecisions was founded in 2001 by John Neeson and Rich Eldh.

SiriusDecisions helped define many business marketing best practices and concepts, including lead scoring and marketing operations. Since 2005, the company's "Demand Waterfall®" model, (updated in 2012 to "The Rearchitected Demand Waterfall" and then to the "Demand Unit Waterfall™" in 2017) has been used by marketers to analyze their lead qualification process, from the inquiry stages through closed sales. The model introduced prominent B2B marketing terms, including marketing qualified lead (MQL) and sales qualified lead (SQL)

SiriusDecisions announced January 8, 2014, that it had received an investment from JMI Equity.

Headquartered in Wilton, CT, the company also had offices in London, Toronto, San Francisco, Waltham, Massachusetts, Austin and Singapore.

On November 27, 2018, the company announced that it was acquired by Forrester Research.

== Products and services ==
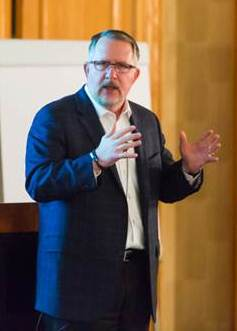
Managing Director John Neeson speaks during the annual SiriusDecisions sales and marketing Summit.

SiriusDecisions’ research services provide information to help executives inform aspects of their marketing, sales and product strategies, including:

- Account-Based Marketing
- Brand and Communications
- Channel Marketing
- Channel Sales
- Content Strategy and Operations
- Customer Engagement
- Demand Creation
- Emerging Growth Strategies
- Marketing Executive (CMO)
- Marketing Operations
- Portfolio Marketing
- Product Management
- Sales Enablement
- Sales Executive (CSO)
- Sales Operations

== Conferences and events ==
Since 2006, SiriusDecisions hosted an annual SiriusDecisions Summit, which brought together marketing, sales, and product professionals and executives to discuss how intersections between their disciplines can be used to solve business problems. During the Summit, SiriusDecisions honored B2B organizations that develop innovative sales and marketing integration practices with its Return on Integration (ROI) Awards. The company also hosted Summit in London and Singapore.

Past SiriusDecision Summit keynotes include:

- Former United States Army General Stanley A. McChrystal (2013)
- Best-selling author Malcolm Gladwell (2014)
- NBA legend and entrepreneur Magic Johnson (2015)
- Internationally acclaimed chef Marcus Samuelsson (2016)
- Renowned and Grammy award-winning singer/songwriter Jewel (2017)
- Entrepreneur and best-selling author Molly Bloom (2018)
- Grammy award-winning artist, actor and activist Common (2019)

== Press coverage ==
SiriusDecisions research and commentary from executives has been featured in Forbes, AdAge, CMO.com, Inc.com, Channel Marketer Report, CRM Magazine, Marketing Magazine and Demand Gen Report.
