= Terragon Group Ltd =

Nigerian tech based company

Terragon Group
- Company type: Private
- Industry: Marketing Technology
- Founded: 2009
- Headquarters: Lagos, Nigeria
- Key people: Elo Umeh (CEO), Ayodeji Balogun (CTO)
- Website: terragongroup.com

Terragon Group Ltd is a Nigerian tech based company that uses data and analytics to help companies market their products in Africa. The company was founded in 2009 by Elo Umeh and Ayodeji Balogun and is headquartered in Lagos, Nigeria with operations in Kenya, Ghana, South Africa and India.

In 2015, Terragon Group released the first advertising mobile application in Africa called ‘Adrenaline’ which allows advertisers to buy inventory and organically generate channels and potential customers.

In April 2018, Terragon raised a US$5million from TLcom Capital. In November 2018, Terragon group acquired Bizense.

In 2021, Terragon became the first African company to make it to the list of verified Customer Data Platform (CDP) companies.
