= O2O =

O2O can refer to:

- Online to offline marketing. (also Offline to online)
- Orion Artemis II Optical Communications System, using laser communications to Earth from lunar orbit.
