= Insider One =

Software company

- Formerly: Insider
- Industry: Software as a service (SaaS); Artificial intelligence
- Founded: 2012
- Founders: Hande Cilingir, Serhat Soyuerel, Muharrem Derinkok, Mehmet Sinan Toktay, Okan Yedibela
- Area served: Worldwide
- Key people: Hande Cilingir (Co-founder & CEO); Serhat Soyuerel (Co-founder & CRO); Muharrem Derinkok (Co-founder & CPO); Mehmet Sinan Toktay (Co-founder & CTO); Okan Yedibela (Co-founder)
- Subsidiaries: Bluecore Inc.
- Website: insiderone.com

Insider One (formerly Insider) is a software as a service (SaaS) company that develops software for customer engagement and marketing automation.

== History ==
Insider One was founded in 2012 in Istanbul by Hande Cilingir, Serhat Soyuerel, Muharrem Derinkok, Mehmet Sinan Toktay, and Okan Yedibela. Originally focused on digital marketing and optimization software across Europe and Asia, the company expanded its operations into Japan in 2017, and later into North America and Latin America.

To support its international growth and software development, the company completed several venture financing rounds between 2016 and 2024, reaching a valuation of $2 billion in 2022. In January 2023, Insider One made its first acquisition, purchasing the Istanbul- and Dubai-based conversational messaging platform MindBehind to integrate instant messaging applications into its software suite.

Following a rebranding to Insider One in December 2025, the company acquired New York-based retail marketing technology company Bluecore in May 2026 to expand its North American retail operations and data infrastructure.

== Technology and operations ==
Insider One develops software as a service (SaaS) for customer relationship management (CRM) and marketing automation. Its core product is an enterprise platform that integrates a customer data platform (CDP), artificial intelligence tools, and cross-channel campaign management. The platform consolidates first-party consumer data across digital touchpoints, including web, mobile applications, email, SMS, and messaging applications, to enable audience segmentation and behavioral tracking.

In March 2025, the company introduced Agent One, a software suite of autonomous AI tools designed to automate campaign execution and customer engagement tasks.

As of 2026, the company has offices across North America, Europe, Asia, and the Middle East.

== Funding ==
Year	Funding round	Amount	Lead investor(s)	References
2016	Series A	US$2.2 million	212	
2018	Series B	US$11 million	Sequoia Capital (now Peak XV Partners)	
2020	Series C	US$32 million	Riverwood Capital	
2022	Series D	US$121 million	Qatar Investment Authority, Riverwood Capital	
2023	Venture round	US$105 million	Qatar Investment Authority, Esas Private Equity	
2024	Series E	US$500 million	General Atlantic	
