= Scott Dorsey =

American entrepreneur

Scott D. Dorsey
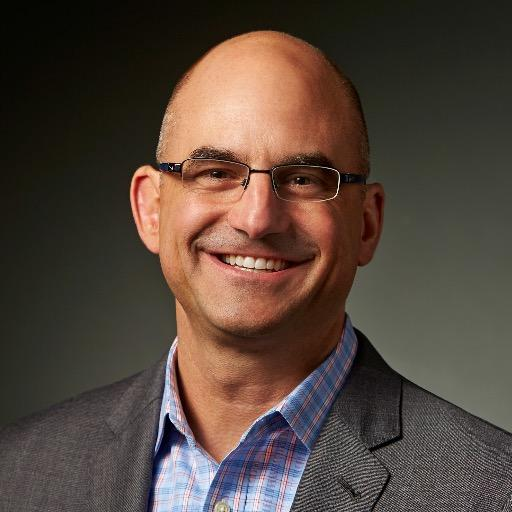
- Born: July 1, 1967 (age 59); Ohio
- Education: Indiana University; Northwestern University Kellogg School of Management
- Occupations: Entrepreneur, investor
- Known for: Managing Partner at High Alpha; Former CEO and Chairman of ExactTarget; Executive Chairman of Zylo

Scott Dorsey (born July 1, 1967) is an American entrepreneur, investor, and startup advisor. He is a co-founder and managing partner at High Alpha, a venture studio that conceives, launches and scales enterprise technology companies. In late 2000, Dorsey, Chris Baggott, and Peter McCormick co-founded ExactTarget, a provider of digital marketing automation and analytics software and services. ExactTarget raised $161.5 million in an initial public offering on the New York Stock Exchange in 2012 and was acquired by salesforce.com for $2.5 billion in 2013. During his career at ExactTarget, Dorsey held the positions of chairman and CEO. Dorsey stepped down as chief executive officer of Salesforce ExactTarget Marketing Cloud in May 2014.

== Early life and education ==
Dorsey was born in Cleveland Ohio and grew up in Naperville, Illinois. He attended Indiana University Bloomington and received a Bachelor's in Marketing from the Kelley School of Business.

He later earned his MBA from the Kellogg School of Management at Northwestern University in 1999.

== Career ==
Dorsey, Baggott, and McCormick co-founded ExactTarget in late 2000. In 2004, ExactTarget raised $10.5 million from Insight Venture Partners and grew to $31.2 million in revenues by 2006 before filing to go public in December 2007. In May 2009, ExactTarget withdrew its IPO application and instead raised $70 million in equity financing from Battery Ventures, Scale Venture Partners, and Greenspring Associates, followed by another $75 million later that year led by Technology Crossover Ventures.

Over the next two years, ExactTarget acquired Keymail Marketing, a UK-based ExactTarget reseller, CoTweet, a social media management tool, mPath Global, an Australian-based reseller, and Frontier Digital, a Brazilian-based reseller. These acquisitions began ExactTarget's international and product line expansions.

In March 2012, ExactTarget raised $161.5 million in its initial public offering on the New York Stock Exchange. ExactTarget went on to acquire marketing automation vendor, Pardot, and product recommendations and intelligence engine, iGoDigital, later in 2012. Salesforce.com acquired ExactTarget for $2.5 billion in June 2013 at a 50% premium. Dorsey stepped down as chief executive officer of Salesforce ExactTarget Marketing Cloud in May 2014.

In 2015, Dorsey co-founded the venture studio, High Alpha, alongside Kristian Andersen and former ExactTarget executives Mike Fitzgerald and Eric Tobias. High Alpha raised $35 million in initial funding in June 2015 from Emergence Capital, Greenspring Associates, and Hyde Park Venture Partners.

Dorsey served for seven years as a board member of Indiana Sports Corp, from 2009 to 2017. In 2013, he was elected Chairman of the Indiana Sports Corp board of directors. Dorsey also served as the Chair for the Marketing and Communications Division for the 2012 Indianapolis Super Bowl Host Committee.

The ExactTarget Foundation was founded in 2011. After the Salesforce acquisition in 2013, the ExactTarget Foundation was reorganized under a new name and mission as Nextech with Dorsey as its chairman. Nextech's mission is to connect educators, innovative nonprofits, and entrepreneurs to deliver programs that inspire and enable young people from all backgrounds to pursue careers in technology.

Dorsey was named Executive Chairman of Zylo, a SaaS management platform, in October 2021.

== Honors and awards ==
Dorsey was named the Indiana 2003 Ernst & Young Entrepreneur of the Year in 2003.

In 2004, Dorsey was recognized by the Indianapolis Business Journal as one of their 40 Under 40.

In 2011, Dorsey was named an American Business Awards Executive of the Year and Techpoint Trailblazer in Technology.

Dorsey was named to the Laureate Central Indiana Junior Achievement Business Hall of Fame and the Indiana Chamber of commerce Business Leader of the Year in 2012.

In 2014, Dorsey was presented the Distinguished Entrepreneur Award by Indiana University's Kelley School of Business.

Dorsey was awarded a Sagamore of the Wabash award, the highest honor which the Governor of Indiana bestows, from Governor Daniels in 2012 and from Governor Pence in 2014.

Dorsey also serves on a number of boards, including Indiana Sports Corp, Nextech, Techpoint, Dean's Advisory Board at Indiana University School of Informatics and Computing, and Global Advisory Board at Kellogg School of Management at Northwestern University
