= Jenny Dearborn =

American business executive and author

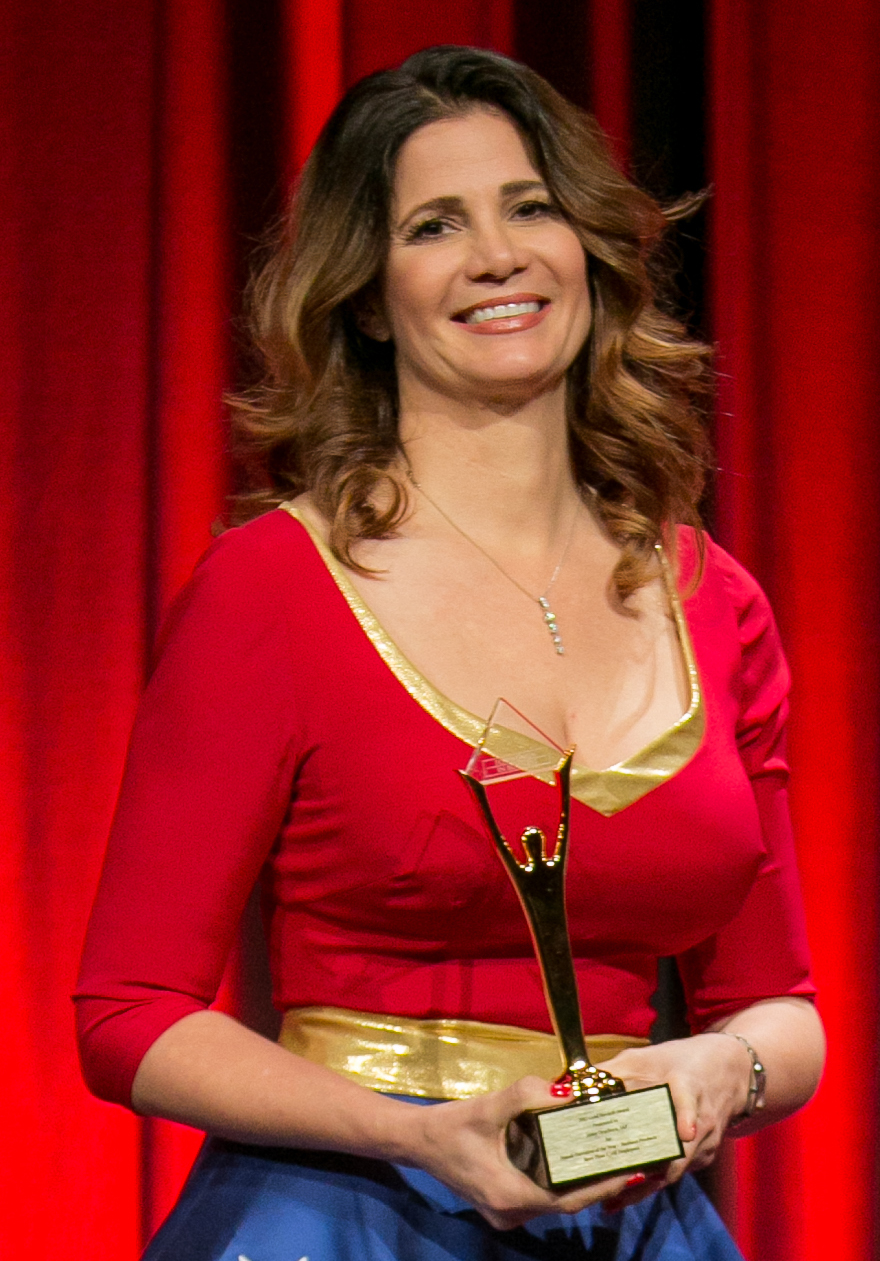
- Dearborn in 2017
- Born: Marin County, California, U.S.
- Education: American River College (AA); University of California, Berkeley (BA); Stanford University (MEd); San José State University (MBA)
- Occupations: Business executive author
- Years active: 1993–present
- Employer: SAP (2012–2019); Klaviyo (2020–2021); BTS Group (2023–present)
- Known for: Former chief talent officer at SAP
- Notable work: Data Driven (2015); The Data Driven Leader (2017)
- Website: jennydearborn.com

Jenny Dearborn is an American business executive and author who is the founder of Actionable Analytics Group. Previously, she served as a chief talent officer and vice president at the software company SAP, where she was recognized as one of the top 50 most powerful women in technology.

== Early life and education ==
Dearborn was born in Marin, California and raised in Davis, California. During her primary and secondary education, she was placed in special education classes due to undiagnosed dyslexia and ADHD. She was officially diagnosed with these conditions, along with mild OCD, at the age of 18. Following her adult diagnoses, Dearborn became an advocate for children with learning disabilities struggling in the American education system.

Dearborn graduated from Davis High School in 1987 and earned an associate degree in Social Sciences from American River College in 1989. She received a Bachelor of Arts in English from the University of California, Berkeley in 1991, followed by a Master of Education from Stanford University in 1993. She later completed an MBA in organization development in 2003.

== Career ==
Dearborn began her career as an English and drama teacher at Woodside High School. In 1995, she transitioned to corporate education, joining Hewlett-Packard as a classroom instructor in the Employee Learning and Development department, where she remained for twenty years. She later held roles as the Chief Learning Architect at Sun Microsystems and the Chief Learning Officer at SuccessFactors.

Following the acquisition of SuccessFactors by SAP, Dearborn was appointed chief learning officer (CLO) by Bill McDermott. In this role, she was responsible for the strategy and education programs for approximately 95,000 employees. She developed the Leadership Excellence Acceleration Program (LEAP), a year-long course designed to advance the careers of high-potential female employees.

In 2015, Dearborn founded the Actionable Analytics Group, a consulting firm. In the same year, her coaching strategies received the Prism Award from the International Coaching Federation, and her team was ranked first globally among corporate learning departments by eLearning Magazine. She left SAP in 2019.

In 2020, she joined the Boston-based start-up Klaviyo as its Chief People Officer and left in 2022. Dearborn currently serves as Chief People Strategy Officer and Head of the Global Talent Insights Practice at BTS. She transitioned to an advisory role at Klaviyo in 2021 and continues to lead Actionable Analytics Group.

== Advocacy ==
Dearborn is an advocate for diversity and inclusion in the workforce. She co-founded the Silicon Valley Apprenticeship Consortium to create alternative career pathways into the technology industry. She has served on the board of directors for organizations including, the Commonwealth Club of California, TheatreWorksUSA, The Association for Talent Development.

== Personal life ==
Dearborn is married to John Tarlton, and they have four children. The family resides in Palo Alto, California.

== Bibliography ==
- Jenny, Dearborn (2015). Data Driven: How Performance Analytics Delivers Extraordinary Sales Results
- Jenny, Dearborn (2017). The Data Driven Leader
- Jenny, Dearborn (2025). The Insight Driven Leader

== Filmography ==
- Until the Wheels Come Off (2022)
- Lilly (2024)

== Recognition ==
Dearborn has been recognized with multiple industry awards, including:

- Silicon Valley Woman of Influence Award (2014)
- Female Executive of the Year (2017)
- Athena Leadership Award (2017)
- Awarded Top 50 Most Influential Women in business in San Francisco by San Francisco Business Journal (2025)
