= Jon David Carder =

American businessman

Jon David Carder is an American businessman. He is the co-founder and CEO of Empyr, an (O2O) commerce company.

== Undertaking ==
After selling Clientshop.com for $10 million, Carder co-founded Mogl, a rewards program concentrating on restaurants using card linked offer technology.
