= Pay-per-call =

Pay-per-call may refer to:

- Pay-per-call advertising, where an advertiser is charged for each telephone call received on a number keyed to a specific advertisement
- Premium-rate telephone numbers, where the caller is charged an inflated price on a "shared-revenue" basis, with a kickback to the owner of the called number.
