= Outbound marketing =

Outbound marketing may refer to:

- Older, non-pejorative sense of marketing communications
- Newer, pejorative sense of interruption marketing
