= Pardot =

Marketing automation platform

- Industry: Marketing Technology
- Founded: January 1, 2007 in Atlanta, USA
- Founders: David Cummings, Adam Blitzer
- Fate: Acquired
- Successor: ExactTarget
- Headquarters: Buckhead, USA
- Parent: Salesforce
- Website: pardot.com

Pardot is a marketing automation platform founded in 2007 in Atlanta, Georgia, by David Cummings and Adam Blitzer. It provides business-to-business marketing automation and lead generation tools.

In October 2012, ExactTarget acquired Pardot for about US$95.5 million. In 2013, Salesforce purchased ExactTarget for US$2.5 billion and integrated Pardot into the Salesforce Marketing Cloud. In 2022, Salesforce rebranded Pardot as Marketing Cloud Account Engagement as part of its unified product naming.
