= Voice broadcasting =

Voice broadcasting is a mass communication technique, begun in the 1990s, that broadcasts telephone messages to hundreds or thousands of call recipients at once. This technology has both commercial and community applications. Voice broadcast users can contact targets (whether they be members, subscribers, constituents, employees, or customers) almost immediately. When used by government authorities, it may be known as an emergency notification system (since such notifications are intended only for use in emergencies).

Voice broadcast systems manage a database of phone lists as well as digitally recorded phone messages. Using telephony components, these computers can simultaneously broadcast thousands of phone messages. Personalized information can be included in the phone messages through the integration of text-to-speech software.

Advanced systems include telephony boards with answering-machine detection, and the logic to properly play a unique message to answering machines without message truncation.

== Interactive voice broadcasting ==
Interactive voice broadcasting (also referred to as interactive voice messaging) programs allow the call recipient to listen to the recorded message and interact with the system by pressing keys on the phone keypad. The system can detect which key is pressed and be programmed to interact and play various messages accordingly. This is a form of Interactive voice response (IVR).

for the interactive version, there will be an option to talk with the agent, so customers can talk directly with the agent for other questions. This is called a two-way IVR.

The actions that can be programmed may include surveys, information confirmation, contact preference confirmation, or navigation through a phone menu. An example of the use of this technology is automated phone surveys, where professional polling organizations place automatic calls to conduct surveys. Respondents are provided survey questions that are answered using DTMF-tone keypad responses.

More qualitative results can be captured by allowing call recipients to leave their own voice messages instead of just button presses. This function can not only be used for "grassroots" lobbying, but can be used to allow loved ones to leave voice messages for each other when separated after a disaster.

== Voice broadcasting law ==
Voice broadcasting law is a subset of laws under telemarketing law. One of the most recent of these laws is the 2008 Telemarketing Sales Rule Amendment as issued by the US Federal Trade Commission (FTC). Predictive dialing drop call rates and prerecorded message delivery restrictions were provided in the amendment. "

== Popularity ==
Voice broadcasting is a popular method of direct marketing. Industry groups such as insurance, real estate, telemarketing, healthcare, direct sales, etc., have used it to create leads or as a follow-up method to their existing or past customers and/or current prospects. Also, one example of the popularity is its use by nonprofit organizations (NPOs). For example, an NPO can use voice broadcasting to send a simple "thank you" message to its donor base. This may be very valuable especially when an organization is a manpower constrained and there is a large donor list to call periodically, e.g., quarterly, to thank or to request additional donations.

== Two voice broadcasting methods for lead creation ==
Two popular methods to create marketing leads with voice broadcasting are to deliver a prerecorded interactive message and the voicemail message. The prerecorded message is commonly referred to as the "press one" method. The dialer or voice broadcasting system calls the consumer, plays a marketing message, and then asks the recipient to press a number on their keypad (e.g., "1") to receive more information or to connect with a live agent.

Instead of reaching the consumer, the consumer's answering machine may have answered the call. The dialer may use an answering machine detection (AMD) algorithm and leave a message on the prospect's answering machine. The objective is for the recipient to check and listen to their messages, and then to call back the phone number in the prerecorded message for more information.

Both of these methods cost much less than making calls with live sales agents. Making a voice broadcast call in the U.S. costs one or two cents. The voice broadcast call does not have a significant labor cost (a $20/hour sales agent consumes $0.33 per minute). Live sales agents are expensive, so telemarketers using live agents will purchase marketing lists that identify good demographic targets. Voice broadcast marketing is cheap enough that marketers may not bother purchasing marketing lists. Voice broadcast marketing only needs live agents for those prospects who express interest in the product by pressing "1" or calling back.

Consumers do not like automated cold calls, so many jurisdictions have made marketing voice broadcasts illegal unless the recipient has previously consented to such calls. The U.S. Congress passed the Telephone Consumer Protection Act (TCPA) in 1991. Recipients of illegal voice broadcast calls under the TCPA may sue the caller for statutory damages of $500 to $1500 per violation. TCPA class actions have been settled for millions of dollars. Even before the TCPA was enacted, state laws prohibited voice broadcast solicitations. California's Consumers Legal Remedies Act prohibited many such calls and allows plaintiffs to recover attorneys' fees.

== See also ==
- Voice-based marketing automation
- Interactive voice response
- Direct marketing
- Robocall
