= Permission marketing =

Method of advertising

Permission marketing is a type of advertising in which the target audience can choose whether or not to receive the adverts. This marketing type is becoming increasingly popular in digital marketing. Seth Godin first introduced the concept in his book "Permission Marketing: Turning Strangers Into Friends, And Friends Into Customers."

== History ==
Traditional marketing methods often involve interruption – whether a television advertisement that cuts into a TV show or an internet pop-up that interferes with a website. According to Godin, such methods (often referred to as "interruption marketing") have become less effective in the modern world, where consumers are overloaded with information.

Interruption marketing is essentially a competition to win people's attention. In today's world of mass-marketing, people are overloaded with advertisements that compete for their limited time and attention span. Yankelovich, Inc claims the average consumer comes into contact with 1 million advertisements per year – or nearly 3000 per day. When there is an overflow of interruptions, people's inevitable response is to disregard them, tune them out, and refuse to respond to them. Such traditional marketing methods are more difficult and costly to attain the same outcome.

In 1999, Godin observed that successful campaigns were the ones that sought the customer's consent. From such observations, Godin believed that marketing strategies should be based on the following elements:

- Anticipated: people will anticipate the service/product information from the company.
- Personal: the marketing information explicitly relates to the customer.
- Relevant: the marketing information is something that the consumer is interested in.

These elements were combined to define permission marketing, first publicized in Godin's book, "Permission Marketing: Turning Strangers into Friends and Friends into Customers", published on May 6, 1999.

== Benefits ==
Permission marketing allows consumers to choose whether or not to be subjected to marketing. This choice can result in better engagement. For example, consumers are more likely to open an email marketing message if they "double opt-in" than a regular "single opt-in." By targeting volunteers, permission marketing improves the odds that consumers pay more attention to the marketing message. Permission marketing thus encourages consumers to engage in a long-standing, cooperative marketing campaign.

- Cost efficiency: Permission marketing employs low cost online tools – social media, search engine optimization, e-mails, etc. Furthermore, businesses can lower their marketing costs by only marketing to consumers who have expressed an interest.
- High conversion rate: As the targeting audience has expressed an interest in the product, it is easier to convert the leads into sales.
- Personalization: Permission marketing allows businesses to run personalized campaigns; it allows them to target specific audiences according to their age, gender, geographical location, etc.
- Long-term relationships with customers: Through the usage of social media and e-mails, businesses can interact and build long-term relationships with customers.
- Marketing reputation: Permission marketing only sends information to those anticipating the information. Therefore, prospects who receive the information feel less discomfort.

== Initiation paradox ==
Supporters of permission marketing claim that it is more effective than interruption marketing, however, it has been claimed that this is paradoxical in that permission marketing is inevitably initiated with interruption marketing. To get the attention of a prospective consumer for a permission-based relationship, the first step requires interruption marketing. However, many techniques in permission marketing may be seen as unreliant on interruption for contact initiation. One example that highlights both approaches is the web search results page format, which typically includes both ads (interrupting the user's access to information) and links to information (providing the information, and often accompanied by offers for further interaction).

== Levels ==
There are five levels of permission in permission marketing. These "levels" measure the degree of permission a consumer has granted to a specific business. At each successive level of the permission framework, the business achieves a higher efficiency state, with a decrease in marketing cost. Thus, businesses usually aim to achieve the "intravenous permission" level. However, the five levels of permission should not be considered a necessary sequential process, as more than one level could apply simultaneously depending on the nature of the business.

- Situational permission: The prospect permits the business to come into contact by providing their personal information.
- Brand trust: The prospect permits the business to continue supplying its needs.
- Personal relationship: The prospect's permission is granted because of a personal relationship that he/she has with someone in the provider organization.
- Points permission: At this stage, the customer has agreed to receive goods or services and has allowed the business to collect their personal data. This is usually because they are given incentives, such as exchangeable points or an opportunity to earn a prize.
- Intravenous permission: The supplier has now taken over the supply function for a specific good or a service; the customer is completely dependent on the business. This is the highest level of permission. The marketer who has taken over the intravenous permission will be making the buying decisions on behalf of their customers.

== Examples ==
Early social media was a prime example – whether it is to post, share, or amplify, the marketer would have to send a friend request (or permission) to the potential prospects.

Opt-in email is an example of permission marketing, where Internet users request to receive information about a certain product or a service. Supporters of permission marketing claim it to be effective, as the potential client would be more interested in information that was requested in advance. It is also more cost-efficient than traditional marketing methods, as businesses only need to target consumers who have expressed an interest in their product.

RSS feeds, where users voluntarily subscribe to an information feed for a website and receive future updates, are a strong method of permission marketing.

Huffington Post is an American online news aggregator and blog which offers original content in areas including politics, business, entertainment, environment, technology, etc. The Huffington Post has a clear permission marketing-based approach: the readers must register on the site using their social media (such as Facebook, Twitter, etc.). The registration implies that readers have permitted for Huffington Post to send them marketing information, such as newsletters.

YouTube is a video-sharing website that allows users to upload, view, and share videos. Many firms utilize YouTube as part of their social media marketing strategy to promote their products and services. Firms specifically use the "subscribing" feature to establish a permission-based relationship with their customers. Subscription would imply that viewers have permitted for the business to market them with updated information, campaign, etc.

Sundance Vacations is a travel company that allows customers to buy vacations in bulk. The company employs a method of permission marketing by attending sporting events, shows, and more and getting people to sign up to win their annual sweepstakes. The entry forms that are filled out contain an agreement that says the company is allowed to contact the person filling the form at the methods provided by the entrant. The potential client's signature is considered a form of consent to contact them, allowing the company to email and phone market to entrants.
