= The Economics of Innocent Fraud =

2004 English-language book by John Kenneth Galbraith

- First edition
- Author: John Kenneth Galbraith
- Publisher: Houghton Mifflin
- Publication date: 2004

The Economics of Innocent Fraud: Truth for Our Time was Harvard economist John Kenneth Galbraith's final book, published by Houghton Mifflin in 2004. It is a 62-page essay that recapitulates themes—such as the dominance of corporate power in the public sector and the role of advertising in shaping consumer demand—found in earlier works.

== Argument ==
In twelve short chapters, Galbraith summarizes what he takes to be a number of types of 'fraud'—some innocent, some less so—inherent in corporate-dominated economic life at the end of the 20th century. His use of the word fraud is not legalistic, but designates what he sees as the divergence between 'approved belief—what I have elsewhere called conventional wisdom—and the reality' (p. ix).

The 'frauds' highlighted are:

1. The replacement of the term 'capitalism' with 'the market system' in American economic and political discourse. He calls the latter 'meaningless, erroneous, bland, and benign' and suggests 'the corporate system' as the more accurate modern replacement (p. 8).
2. The belief in consumer sovereignty within the corporate/market system. Consumer consumption, according to Galbraith, is to a large extent controlled and manipulated by corporate management through advertising and other forms of persuasion (p. 13-14).
3. The use of Gross Domestic Product (GDP) as the standard measure of economic and larger social advance. GDP, argues Galbraith, measures only producer-influenced production, to the exclusion of the valuable 'cultural, artistic, educational, and scientific aspects of life' (p. 15).
4. The paradox inherent in the word 'work', which signifies drudgery and boredom for low-paid workers but provides enjoyment and reward for the affluent workers. Similarly, work avoidance in the poor is regarded as unacceptable, but acceptable for those who can afford leisure (pp. 18–21).
5. The illusion that shareholders, stockholders, investors, boards of directors — even owners — are relevant to the large corporate entities that dominate the economy. In fact, claims Galbraith, it is management (corporate bureaucracy) that runs them (pp. 28–31).
6. The distinction between the 'private sector' and the 'public sector' as used by economists, politicians, and commentators. Galbraith believes that large corporate interests and leaders (private sector) have become so embedded within government (public sector) that the distinction cannot be maintained. He cites corporate influence on the Treasury, and defense industry influence in foreign policy, as prime examples (p. 36).
7. The passing off of hopeful economic prediction by experts and commentators as truth, and the related fraud of harsh lay-offs for workers when rosy predictions inevitably turn out to be false (p. 40-42).
8. The illusion that the Federal Reserve, by raising or lowering interest rates, has any effect whatsoever on spurring growth or preventing inflation. This Galbraith calls 'our most prestigious form of fraud, our most elegant escape from reality' (p. 43). According to him, 'only in innocence does it [the Fed] control general consumer and business spending' (p. 47).

In three concluding chapters he makes a case for impartial government oversight of corporate behavior; returns to his theme of corporate dominance in the affairs of the state, particularly in the military and defense, for its own enrichment; and claims that additional tax relief for corporations serves no public good. He ends by drawing an analogy between the failure to redress social hardship through sound economic policy and the dominance of war-making in our economic life. He calls war 'the decisive human failure' (p. 62).
