= Mobile marketing automation =

Mobile marketing automation refers to the use of software to execute, manage and automate mobile marketing tasks and processes. For example, someone who manages an iOS or Android app could automate push notifications or in-app messages. They could also segment their existing app users to send messages only to the people they want to target.

Mobile marketing automation is different from traditional marketing automation because mobile users often behave differently than web users. For example, the constraint of a smaller screen size causes differences in user behavior. However, the number of users who have adapted to mobiles has grown drastically over the years. With Google penalizing websites that are not mobile friendly, marketing platforms have also made the shift to mobile.

Increasing demand for mobile marketing automation is seen, with 71% of marketers believing that mobile marketing is core to their business.

The mobile industry continues to be one of the fastest growing industries in the world. The number of apps being created has increased substantially across Apple iOS, Android, and Amazon. It has been reported that Apps account for 89% of mobile media time, while websites take up the other 11%.

Another important aspect of mobile marketing automation is the use of A/B testing. This is the concept of testing two different marketing platforms on consumers to see which one performs better. After implementing marketing campaigns, the A/B testing begins and automatically finding the optimal campaign and continuing to show only the winning option.
