= Digital marketing engineer =

A digital marketing engineer is a member of a marketing team who applies web technology and digital marketing platforms (such as a website, email system, CMS, CRM, or other software application) for the purpose of achieving marketing business goals. It is a hybrid role involving both marketing and technology knowledge. The need for digital marketing engineers arose, as a result of marketing becoming reliant on increasingly sophisticated digital technologies.

== See also ==
- Digital marketing
- Demand generation
- Conversion optimization
- Web analytics
- Search engine optimization
- Software engineer
