= Call logging =

Collection and reporting of telephone call data

Call logging is the collection, evaluation, and reporting of technical and statistical data about telephone calls. It does not encompass phone tapping or call recording.

== Collecting data ==
Telephone call data, such as originating station, destination, start and ending times, and transmission characteristics, is collected from a telecommunications system or private branch exchange (PBX) in form of call detail records (CDRs). The equipment typically presents this data on older PBXs via a serial communications port, or more recently via a computer network over an Ethernet connection. From the interface, CDRs are collected on computer systems running call logging and analysis software. Some PBX manufacturers provide their own basic call logging software but many other third-party software packages are available.

== Call logging software ==
The goal of the call logging software is to interpret the raw CDR data and produce graphical and summarizing reports. Call logging software packages differ in the sizes of PBX systems that they can support, from hundreds of extensions to hundreds of thousands of extensions. They also differ in the capability of logging specific types of events or data and support for specialized PBX features. In general terms, call logging reports can highlight such areas as:

- Cost Control – cost of calls, cost of trunk lines, costs by department or individual extension, number of unused extensions, etc. Call logging software can also discover instances of Telephone fraud.
- Performance Management – looks at how long it is taking an organization to answer phone calls by operator, department or extension and demonstrates whether they meet acceptable target levels for that organization.
- Capacity Management – judges whether the system is being over or under utilized. It examines trunk usage and call patterns that show where extra capacity is required or where cost savings can be achieved.
- QoS Reporting – modern VoIP PBXs are able to output quality of service data in addition to standard CDRs. An up-to-date call logging package should be able to include this data along with its other reports to help monitor and improve system performance.

== History ==
=== United Kingdom ===
During the 1970s, Post Office Telecommunications was embarking on upgrading the telephone network, with the view to modernizing the various established mechanical switching devices, consisting mostly of Strowger exchanges, employed in the UK telephone exchanges, and replacing them with an electronic system. This replacement system became known as System X. Concurrently, and as part of this network upgrade, a dedicated engineering group was formed within the division THQ (Telecoms) to design a call logging system and to establish its feasibility for integration within the various existing Strowger and electronic exchanges, prior to their eventual replacement. A mix of different telephone exchange equipment was selected for trial within Scotland, comprising Strowger pre-2000, 2000 and 4000 type switches located in Director telephone systems and non-Director areas. The call logging trial proved successful and while it was initially designed to gather phone call data and cost of billing details specific to the customers' call's, a hidden benefit emerged such that local management were also able to see a pattern of the types of calls being generated, i.e. calls to and from certain businesses in addition to billing information, which was used to ease flow of traffic during peak times in the exchange and to plan for future customer provision within a catchment area. The concept of this call logging equipment was also deployed in UXD exchanges for remote areas where a System X exchange was not considered feasible.

== See also ==
- Call management
- Call-tracking software
