= Real-time marketing =

Type of marketing technique

Real-time marketing is marketing performed "on-the-fly" to determine an appropriate or optimal approach to a particular customer at a particular time and place. It is a form of market research inbound marketing that seeks the most appropriate offer for a given customer sales opportunity, reversing the traditional outbound marketing (or interruption marketing) which aims to acquire appropriate customers for a given 'pre-defined' offer. The dynamic 'just-in-time' decision making behind a real-time offer aims to exploit a given customer interaction defined by website clicks or verbal contact centre conversation.

== History ==
Real-time marketing techniques developed during the mid-1990s following the initial deployment of customer relationship management (CRM) solutions in major retail banking, investment banking and telecommunications companies. The intrinsic and prevailing 'heavyweight' nature of the key CRM vendors at this time, who were generally focused on major back and front office system integration projects, provided an opportunity for niche players within the campaign management application arena.

The implementation of real-time marketing solutions through the late 1990s would typically involve a 10- to 14-week delivery project with 1-2 FTE expert consultants and often would follow an earlier outbound marketing solution implementation. This relatively lightweight delivery model had obvious appeal within the vendor sales cycle and customer procurement context but was ultimately to prove a disincentive for major systems integration services providers to partner with real-time marketing vendors.

== Unrealized promise ==
The term "real-time marketing" has the potential weakness of self-limiting the underlying decisioning server capability to cross-sell and up-sell despite the observation that this particular function is generally the most compelling aspect of the application class. Vendors therefore found themselves re-branding real-time marketing products to suggest a more holistic appreciation of enterprise interaction decision management.

In some respects, these early real-time marketing customer implementations were ahead of their time despite acknowledged revenue realization within the early adopters.

Gartner's predictions for the Gartner Top 10 Technologies for 2011 suggest that whatever the nomenclature, real-time marketing will continue to evolve, crucially to embrace mobile platforms underpinned by an awareness of customer context, location and social networking (collective intelligence) implications.

== See also ==
- Haggling
- Predictive analytics
- Marketing automation
- Online marketing platform
- Public relations
- Viral marketing
- Mobile marketing
