= AfterShip =

E-commerce shipping, order tracking, and returns software company

- Type: Private
- Industry: Software as a service, electronic commerce, logistics technology
- Founded: December 2011
- Founders: Teddy Chan; Andrew Chan; Dante Tsang
- Products: Multi-channel shipping management Real-time order tracking Automated returns and exchanges Warranty claims management Self-serve order edits Shipping and returns protection

AfterShip is a software company that develops shipment tracking and post-purchase services for e-commerce. Its technology consolidates tracking information from different postal services and private delivery companies. AfterShip applies its carrier-integration and shipment-data technology through its primary commercial software as a service platform, providing tracking, shipping, returns, and other post-purchase tools to merchants.

In September 2026, AfterShip released AfterShip Intelligence, a set of predictive and automation features which the company says are used for delivery prediction, shipment-exception forecasting, and returns processing.

== History ==
AfterShip was founded in Hong Kong in December 2011. The company initially developed a service that enabled online shops to track shipments automatically and notify customers when a delivery's status changed.

AfterShip presented its product at DEMO Asia in 2012. VentureBeat, reporting on the event, described it as a company that helped online stores automate package tracking and customer notifications. Later that year, the company secured seed financing from the Australian company Business Switch. Tech in Asia also covered the financing and described AfterShip as providing package tracking to both online retailers and consumers.

The company introduced a package-tracking application programming interface (API) in January 2013. The API allowed merchants to obtain information from multiple delivery companies through a single service and provide post-purchase tracking and return information to their customers.

AfterShip launched its commercial platform publicly in July 2013. The launch included a tracking-button plugin that online merchants could place on their websites, along with paid service plans based on shipment volume.

In 2014, AfterShip received a US$1 million Series A investment from IDG-Accel. At the time, TechCrunch reported that the platform had integrated with 183 carriers, had more than 15,000 users, and was tracking approximately three million active shipments per month. Reporting on the investment, Hong Kong's Apple Daily discussed the company's development and co-founder Teddy Chan's earlier entrepreneurial experience.

Co-founder Teddy Chan told China Daily that the idea for AfterShip originated from difficulties he encountered while operating an online shop. Tracking international orders across different carrier websites and answering customers' delivery enquiries required substantial manual work. In 2018, the newspaper reported that AfterShip was collecting information from 470 carriers in more than 200 countries and providing tracking services to more than 30,000 businesses.

In 2020, AfterShip made AfterShip Shipping API, previously offered as an enterprise SaaS subscription, available without shipment-volume fees. AfterShip Shipping API integrated with retailers' existing shipping systems and provided functions including label printing, delivery estimates, carrier-cost information, and performance analysis.

AfterShip raised US$66 million in a Series B funding round led by Tiger Global Management in April 2021, with participation from Hillhouse Capital's GL Ventures. TechCrunch reported that its software processed more than six billion shipments annually and tracked deliveries handled by more than 740 carriers.

As of 2026, AfterShip reportedly tracks deliveries handled by 1,400 different carriers.

== Products and services ==
AfterShip develops e-commerce software for businesses and consumers, including multi-carrier shipment tracking, shipping management, returns, marketing, and consumer package-tracking tools. Its products use integrations with postal services and private delivery companies to aggregate shipping information and provide services across different stages of the post-purchase process.

=== Order tracking ===
AfterShip's original commercial product aggregates tracking information from multiple carriers into a single system, allowing merchants to monitor shipments handled by different postal services and delivery companies. The service automatically identifies carriers from tracking numbers and allows merchants to view shipments by status, including deliveries that are in transit, delivered, or delayed. Merchants can integrate the tracking service into their websites through an API, e-commerce applications, or a tracking widget.

The tracking software allows merchants to provide shipment information without redirecting customers to individual carrier websites. Merchants can create branded tracking pages and configure automated delivery notifications for customers through channels including email and SMS. The platform also provides shipment analytics that can be used to compare carrier performance, identify delayed deliveries, and estimate delivery times.

=== Shipping ===
AfterShip's shipping API connects retailers' existing systems with multiple shipping carriers through a common interface. The service supports the creation of shipping and return labels and provides information about courier costs, estimated delivery times, and shipment performance. Retailers can connect their existing carrier accounts and continue using shipping rates they have negotiated directly with carriers. The system is intended to reduce the need for retailers to develop and maintain separate technical integrations with each carrier they use.

=== Returns and exchanges ===
AfterShip expanded its platform beyond shipment tracking to include self-service returns software for online retailers and their customers. The returns product forms part of the company's broader post-purchase software suite alongside shipment tracking and shipping services.

The product suite supports self-serve order edits, automated return and exchange processing, and warranty-claims management. Additionally, AfterShip provides specialised post-purchase coverage options, including Return Care and Shipping Protection, to assist merchants in managing lost, damaged, or returned goods.

=== Tracking app ===
AfterShip also provides consumer-facing package-tracking software that allows shoppers to monitor personal deliveries from multiple carriers through a single service. The consumer software applies the same aggregated carrier-tracking model used by the company's merchant products to individual shipments. Distinguishing the consumer mobile application from enterprise software, the Tracking App provides shoppers with unified tracking updates across supported couriers.

=== MCP server ===
AfterShip offers the AfterShip Post-Purchase MCP Server, which uses the open Model Context Protocol to connect AI assistants directly with a merchant's AfterShip shipment-tracking and returns data. The server allows compatible AI assistants to search and filter shipments, retrieve package status, carrier checkpoints, and estimated delivery dates, and search return merchandise authorisations and examine return items, refund status, and processing progress. The Post-Purchase MCP connection is read-only, meaning an AI assistant can retrieve and report shipment and return information but cannot modify, cancel, or delete data in the merchant's AfterShip account. AfterShip also provides MCP integrations as part of a broader developer platform that includes APIs and SDKs for shipment tracking, returns, shipping, order protection, and other post-purchase functions.

=== AfterShip Intelligence ===
In September 2026, AfterShip launched AfterShip Intelligence, which applies automation and predictive models to post-purchase tracking, returns, and shipping. AfterShip describes the underlying models as designed for delivery prediction, exception forecasting, and return intelligence. The release includes AfterShip Agent, which the company says is used for exception handling and return merchandise authorisation (RMA) review; AfterShip cited Dr. Squatch and Naked Wardrobe as launch customers applying it to those tasks.

== Reception ==
In 2014, Nobuyuki Yashima of Weekly ASCII rated AfterShip the most usable of the parcel-tracking applications he compared. He praised its push notifications, shipment notes, archive, and sharing functions, but criticised incomplete Japanese localisation, English-language contact details, and occasional incorrect identification of Japanese carriers.

Newsday highlighted the application's coverage of more than 750 delivery companies in 2021 and considered it particularly useful for less widely used carriers. That year, Jennifer Dudley-Nicholson of The Daily Telegraph noted its support for more than 800 carriers, automatic updates, and extraction of tracking information from connected Gmail or Outlook accounts.

Cult of Mac reviewed the iOS application in 2023, praising its carrier coverage, lack of advertising and in-app purchases, and fast push notifications. The reviewer reported that AfterShip notifications sometimes arrived before Amazon's for the same package, but noted that automatic email importing did not support iCloud.

In 2024, Computeractive recommended AfterShip for package tracking, citing its support for more than 700 carriers, manual and email-based tracking-number entry, notifications, and map-based shipment information. Fast Company described it as a straightforward way to consolidate tracking numbers and delivery updates, highlighting web and mobile access, automatic carrier detection, optional email importing, and use without an account.

In 2026, Sourcing Journal and Digital Commerce 360 reported on AfterShip Intelligence through its use by launch customer Dr. Squatch. Digital Commerce 360 reported that Dr. Squatch reduced its "where is my order?" enquiries by 25% and quoted a company analyst saying the software provided context and automation for resolving delivery issues more efficiently.

== See also ==
- Package tracking
- Order fulfillment
- Software as a service
- Electronic commerce
