= Call-tracking software =

Call tracking software records information about incoming telephone calls and, in some regions, records the calls themselves. Call tracking is a technology which can enable the pay per call, pay per minute or pay per lead business model, allowing the tracking of phone calls to be associated with performance-based advertising such as Google Ads, SEO Services, Display and Electronic Direct Marketing, and supplying additional analytic information about the phone calls themselves. Call tracking is a method of performance review for advertising and/or staff. It is based on the technological possibility of measuring the behavior of callers and is thus the equivalent in telephony to the conversion tracking used on the internet. Via different channels, both procedures offer the opportunity of clearly assigning a customer response to a specific advertising medium.

== Methods ==
There are currently four technological methods for telephone tracking. Besides an exclusively web-based function, it is possible to evaluate call numbers using a telephone server solution. In addition, there are a few software providers who support advertisers in telephone tracking.

=== Call-back function ===
The call-back function is exclusively web-based. Here, the internet user provides a phone number on the website of a company that is advertising at which he/she can be called back. As soon as the user confirms she wants to be contacted with a click of the mouse, the technology behind this automatically sets up a telephone conversation between the advertiser and the interested party.

At the same time, a cookie saves information on which online advertising medium led to the telephone call. As a web-based service, this procedure is limited to advertising measures on the internet.

Callback is often automated through the use of web callback or mobile phone applications.

=== Call number tracking ===
Unlike the call-back procedure, call number tracking does not include any web-based functions but is based on a telephone server solution. As a rule, advertisers are provided a multitude of service numbers for customer feedback, where landline numbers can also be used. This enables each print ad, each online banner and any number of other advertising media to communicate an individual phone number as a response element.

=== Dynamic Call Tracking ===
Dynamic call tracking works similarly to Google Analytics but has additional software that allows websites to dynamically swap phone numbers presented to each user when the website loads. This is known as dynamic call tracking. In essence, providers for this type of service supply users with code snippets that are placed on their website to control what numbers are shown to users on the site (dynamic number insertion). There are two main methods of dynamic call tracking:

- Channel based tracking
- Unique session tracking

Channel based tracking allows businesses to capture information on call sources down to the marketing channel, such as Google Ads, Bing Ads, organic and referral traffic, etc. This provides a breakdown of the source of the call but does not provide particular information about the web session. This method involves assigning a particular number to a particular source of the web session.

Unique session tracking tracks down each user session on a website, by pooling numbers and allocating each web session a number for a period of time via dynamic number insertion. This allows web-tracking software to accurately link each call to a web session if it results in a call being made to the number shown. The data which can be drawn from this method can be:

- Marketing Source
- Marketing Medium
- Marketing Campaign
- Call Summary/Transcription
- Call Sentiment
- Keyword
- Landing page
- Conversion Page
- Experiments (if A/B Split Testing)
- Device Type
- IP Address Location
- UTM Parameters

This provides a more comprehensive data-set for marketing purposes and can be integrated with industry standard software, such as CRM Systems, Google Ads, Google Analytics, etc.

Additionally, this form of call tracking can be integrated with emerging AI technologies, including AI voice and chat agents, rules-based call management, and automated transcription and analysis. This next evolution of call tracking helps offload routine tasks from human staff, such as answering FAQs, scheduling appointments, and routing initial calls to specific departments.

=== Static Number Tracking ===
Static number tracking allows marketers to assign an individual phone number to online and traditional marketing sources such as Newspaper, Radio, Television, Billboards and other mediums of delivery for marketing materials. It differs from session based tracking as software cannot be run to dynamically replace the numbers for each viewer, however, this is useful for marketing purposes.

== See also ==
- Call logging
- Direct selling
- Telemarketing
- Voice-based marketing automation
- Web analytics

Covert means:

- Covert listening device
- Eavesdropping
- Phone hacking
- Privacy
- Secure telephone
- Telephone call recording laws
- Telephone tapping
