= Digital marketing system =

Centralized channel distribution in digital marketing system used by SaaS products

A digital marketing system (DMS) is a method of centralized channel distribution used primarily by SaaS (Software as a service) products. It combines a content management system (CMS) with data centralization and syndication across the web, mobile, scannable surface, and social channels.

== Web ==
A digital marketing system (DMS) publishes to web channels, usually in the form of a stand-alone website. It can manage any part of the web process, including web design, web hosting, domain registering, marketing, content creation and other standard methods of web promotion. The goal of web publication is to give the user a digital 'home' on the web, where clients, guests, fans and other web browsers arrive as a destination. Other methods of digital marketing often work to drive traffic to the web channel.

Examples of SaaS DMS services are HubSpot and Hootsuite.

A DMS publishes to popular social channels, including Facebook, Twitter and Instagram in order to drive traffic to the user's website. The publication can be in the form of text, images, or videos.

== Mobile ==
A DMS can distribute content via mobile channels, which have grown significantly as a marketing touchpoint. Research has found that sales made through mobile devices account for between 22% and 27% of all online sales, making mobile an essential channel within digital marketing systems.

== Privacy issues ==
Digital marketing is considered a challenge to privacy because consumers' information is searched, collected, and used in digital marketing without consumers' awareness. The privacy of customers is important because it is related to customers' perceived value, satisfaction, loyalty, their trust in a company, and the performance of a company.

=== Types of information ===
Basic information:

In the traditional sense, private information mainly includes gender, age, educational background, marital status and other basic information.

In the network society, private information also includes personalized digital information such as account passwords.

Activity information:

Private information refers to browsing history, purchasing records, location, social activities and so on

=== Illegal use of information ===
At present, the discussion on the consequences of privacy issues caused by digital marketing technology is increasingly focused on the possibility of illegal use of information. The information of consumers may become commodities, which will be exchanged or traded without the consumer's awareness and authorization.

The consumers' information is mainly exchanged or transacted in two forms. One is that the related merchants share those data. The other is that those data are sold by certain recommenders to a third party. For example, the data that can identify the financial status of consumers is very attractive to credit agencies. All of these above increases the risk of consumer privacy.

=== Customer attitude ===
Some customers tend to choose the latter between a right to privacy and other favourable conditions. Evidence shows that some customers are willing to allow merchants to use their personal information if they can have something to gain in return, even just small rewards, even though they do worry about their privacy may be invaded. In addition, digital marketing provide convenience to people. In the minds of some customers, this convenience is more important than their privacy, especially for teens. Nevertheless, most people are very concerned about whether their privacy is protected.

=== Supervision and administration ===
Permission marketing is a system where consumers can grant licenses only to a few merchants which are chosen from a large number of merchants. Merchants can also post privacy logs to promote transparency and accountability.

The General Data Protection Regulation (GDPR) is an example which meets the above requirements. It stipulates that merchants can collect customers' information only for specific, clear and legitimate purposes and deal with them only in a fair, transparent, and legal manner and merchants must protect this data. Customers should be informed that how will their data be used, what the effects will be and other relevant information in a concise, easy-to-understand and free way so that they can determine whether it is necessary to grant authorization or not. Besides the right to be informed, the GDPR also provides customers with seven other rights such as the right of access, the right to erasure, the right to restrict processing, the right to object and establishes corresponding accountability system.
