= Interruption marketing =

Interruption marketing or outbound marketing is promoting a product through continued advertising, promotions, public relations and sales. It's the opposite of permission marketing and inbound marketing. It is considered to be an annoying version of the traditional way of doing marketing whereby companies focus on finding customers through advertising. (Confusingly, the ambiguous term outbound marketing is sometimes used as a label for interruption marketing. This gives rise to an ambiguity because in the past the term had a different meaning, namely that information about finished product capability was flowing out to prospective customers who have a need for it i.e. benign marketing communication and product marketing.)

== Types of interruption marketing ==
Interruption marketing can be via various techniques, such as:

- Facebook: promoting a good or service on the news feed or elsewhere on their platform
- Telemarketing: act of promoting a good or service over the telephone
- Print media advertising: promote a product via newspapers or magazines
- Cold calling: the solicitation of business from potential customers who have had no prior contact with the salesperson conducting the call
- Direct mail: promotional circulars sent directly via mail
- E-mail spam: electronic mails sent to large mailing lists
- TV/radio advertisements: promote a product via television and radio

== Usefulness of interruption marketing ==
The usefulness of interruption marketing to a business depends on what the company wishes to achieve. If the company has sufficient funds to invest in an advertising campaign and that the management wishes to have quick results, then interruption marketing may be most appropriate. Most businesses depend on interruption marketing to bring in their profits. Site Pro News has stated that the main difference between permission and interruption marketing is that interruption marketing gives quick results and allows for a more scientific way to measure sales.

== Problems encountered with interruption marketing ==
With outbound marketing, marketers are often expected to find different ways to cope with the rejections from potential customers. Also, advertisements have expiry dates and once the expiry dates have been reached, the campaign will have to be started again. Thus, the return on investment of advertisement campaigns is rather low most of the time. Outbound marketing is often considered to be a poorly targeted technique as it cannot be personalised to specific customers. Moreover, advertisements often interrupt customers and as such, they may be wrongly considered by potential consumers.

== Permission and interruption marketing ==
To the opposite of interruption marketing, permission marketing is more about getting found by customers. The main components of permission marketing include content, search engine optimisation and social media. With permission marketing, the company is encouraged to build up a long term relationship with customers which can be beneficial in the long run. Also inbound marketing allows for a more targeted traffic on websites which increases the conversion rates. In fact, with technology, permission marketing is often considered to be more effective and less costly.

As per Brian Halligan, CEO and Founder of HubSpot, interruption marketing techniques are becoming less effective, stating:

Your average human today is inundated with over 2000 outbound marketing interruptions per day and is figuring out more and more creative ways to block them out, including caller ID, spam filtering, TiVo, and Sirius satellite radio. Second, the cost of coordination around learning about something new or shopping for something new using the internet (search engines, blogs, and social media sites) is now much lower than going to a seminar at the Marriott or flying to a trade show in Las Vegas.

However, most people are more accustomed to interruption marketing and this often results in companies spending more of their marketing budgets on outbound marketing. To be able to gain additional advantages, some companies are combining both inbound and outbound marketing and making use of multiple channels to reach a larger audience.

== See also ==
- Differences between interruption and permission marketing
- Methods of interruption marketing (in German)
- Criticism
