= Lead scoring =

System to judge the value of sales leads

Lead scoring is a methodology used to rank prospects against a scale that represents the perceived value each lead represents to the organization. The resulting score is used to determine which leads a receiving function (e.g. sales, partners, teleprospecting) will engage, in order of priority.

Lead scoring models incorporate both explicit and implicit data. Explicit data is provided by or about the prospect, for example - company size, industry segment, job title or geographic location. Implicit scores are derived from monitoring prospect behavior; examples of these include Web-site visits, whitepaper downloads or e-mail opens and clicks. Additionally, social scores analyze a person's presence and activities on social networks.

Lead scoring allows a business to customize a prospect's experience based on his or her buying stage and interest level and greatly improves the quality and "readiness" of leads that are delivered to sales organizations for followup.

Lead scoring is a popular feature among B2B marketing automation products.

== Key benefits ==
When a lead scoring model is effective, the key benefits are:

- Increased sales efficiency and effectiveness: Lead scoring focuses sales attention on leads that the organization deems most valuable, ensuring that leads that are unqualified or have low perceived value are not sent to sales for engagement.
- Increased marketing effectiveness: A lead scoring model quantifies for marketers what types of leads or lead characteristics matter most, which helps marketing more effectively target its inbound and outbound programs and deliver more high-quality leads to sales.
- Tighter marketing and sales alignment: Lead scoring helps strengthen the relationship between marketing and sales by establishing a common language with which marketing and sales leaders can discuss the quality and quantity of leads generated.
- Increase in Revenue: Lead scoring also ensures that sales goes first for leads that are qualified by their scores. The probability of a lead with higher scores closing is higher than one with a lower score. This indirectly contributes to a growth in revenue as well.

== Lead scoring methodologies ==
Various lead scoring methodologies are employed:

- Ideal Customer Profile (ICP): uses attributes of known contacts to decide to score (e.g. job title, company size) and allows an organization to focus their efforts on leads that represent their ideal customer. An example would include Hubspot's lead scoring system that bases lead scoring on the values of various fields within the CRM.
- Lamb or Spam: most often employed by small businesses who do not have a clear ideal customer profile (ICP), the lamb or spam model consists of filtering out low-quality leads and surfacing high-potential leads. Low-quality leads are identified by online businesses by personal email address domains (gmail, hotmail, yahoo) or temporary email generators used to send email spam or sign up anonymously. High-quality leads are identified by their corporate email domains as well as firmographic data points such as job title and company size.
- Rule-Based: these lead scoring models assign point values to a lead's firmographic & behavioral attributes. Point thresholds are set for a lead to be considered a good or bad fit. There are rule based scoring solutions built into larger marketing automation platforms, as well as add-ons which act as complements to CRM's such as lead scoring solutions for Salesforce CRM.
- Predictive Lead Scoring: predictive lead scoring models use machine learning to generate a predictive model based on historical customer data augmented by third party data sources. The approach is to analyze past lead behavior, or past interactions between a company and leads, and find positive correlations of such data to a positive business outcome (for instance, a closed deal).

Businesses iterate on existing methodologies and change methodologies in an effort to better prioritize sales engagement. As businesses grow in headcount & the number of products they sell, predictive lead scoring methodologies are generally favored for their ability to ingest new customer data routinely and evolve its predictions.

== Predictive lead scoring ==
With machine learning, lead scoring models have evolved to include components of predictive analytics, generating Predictive Lead Scoring models. Predictive Lead Scoring leverage first party data - such as internal marketing, sales & product data - as well as third party data - such as data enrichment & intent data - in order to build a machine learning model of the ideal customer profile. Predictive Lead Scoring models can also be used to identify, qualify & engage product-qualified leads based on identifying statistically differentiating elements in historical user behavior which best predicts whether a user will spend above a certain threshold.

Predictive Lead Scoring is particularly beneficial for SaaS businesses, which have a high Customer lifetime value & a plethora of customer data. Predictive lead scoring models enable businesses to identify high-value prospects early in the buyer journey, creating a FastLane experience for prospects predicted to be a good firmographic & behavioral fit.

The success of Predictive Lead Scoring models is measured by their ability to identify a subset of prospective buyers who will account for a significant portion of sales opportunities. This is expressed in the following way:

X% of leads represent Y% of conversions

Optimal performance of a predictive lead scoring model sees X approaching 0, Y approaching 100 & conversions defined as a bottom-of-funnel metric such as opportunity created or opportunity won.

== See also ==
- Business intelligence
- Balanced scorecard
- Customer Intelligence
- Customer service
- Database marketing
- Enterprise feedback management
- Marketing automation
- Predictive analytics
- Sales force management system
