= Digital marketing =

Marketing of products or services using digital technologies or digital tools

Advertising revenue over time as a percent of US GDP, showing rise in digital advertising since 1995 at the expense of print media (graph from 2017)

Digital marketing is a component of marketing that uses digital technologies such as desktop computers, mobile phones, and other digital media platforms to promote products and services.

It has significantly changed how brands and businesses use technology for marketing since the 1990s and 2000s. As digital platforms became increasingly incorporated into marketing plans and everyday life, and as people increasingly used digital devices instead of visiting physical shops, digital marketing campaigns became increasingly common, employing combinations of methods. These methods include search engine optimization (SEO), search engine marketing (SEM), content marketing, influencer marketing, content automation, campaign marketing, data-driven marketing, e-commerce marketing, social media marketing, social media optimization, e-mail direct marketing, display advertising, e-books, optical disks and games.

Digital marketing also extends to non-Internet channels that provide digital media, such as television, mobile phones (SMS and MMS), callbacks, and on-hold mobile ringtones. This extension to non-Internet channels differentiates digital marketing from online marketing.

== History ==
=== Origins ===
During the 1980s, the storage capacity of computers was already large enough to store large volumes of customer information. As a result, companies started choosing online techniques such as database marketing rather than relying on limited list brokers. These databases allowed companies to track customers' information more effectively, changing the relationship between buyers and sellers.

A 2023 study credits the SoftAd Group (later ChannelNet) with coining the term digital marketing. Founded by Paula Tompkins in 1985, SoftAd was an early company in using computers to deliver marketing content directly to consumers. Its marketing campaigns were first distributed on floppy disk and later on CD-ROM and the Web.

The term digital marketing came into general use in the 1990s. Search engines also emerged during the decade with the first search engine for FTP sites, Archie, being developed at McGill University. The first clickable banner ad, the "You Will" campaign by AT&T was launched in 1994. Within the first four months, 44% of all people who viewed the advertisement clicked on it. Early digital marketing efforts focused primarily on simple HTML websites and the growing practice of email marketing, which enabled direct communication with consumers.

=== 2000s ===
In the 2000s, with increasing numbers of Internet users and the introduction of the iPhone, customers began searching for products and making decisions online instead of consulting a salesperson, which created a new problem for the marketing department of a company. A survey conducted in the United Kingdom in 2000 found that most retailers had not yet registered their own domain names. These challenges encouraged marketers to explore new ways to integrate digital technology into marketing strategies. At the same time, pay-per-click (PPC) advertising, introduced by Google AdWords in 2000, allowed businesses to target specific keywords, making digital marketing more measurable and cost-effective.

The mid-2000s saw the emergence of social media platforms such as Facebook (2004), YouTube (2005), and Twitter (2006). These platforms enabled companies to talk to their customers, and customers to talk directly to one another about products and the companies that provide them.

In 2007, marketing automation was introduced as a response to the rapidly changing marketing climate. Marketing automation is the process by which software is used to automate conventional marketing processes. It helps companies to segment customers, launch multichannel marketing campaigns, and provide personalized information for customers based on their specific activities. In this way, users' activity (or lack thereof) triggers a personal message that is customized to the user in their preferred platform. However, not all companies implement marketing automation successfully.

=== 2010s ===
Digital marketing became increasingly sophisticated during the 2010s, as the proliferation of devices capable of accessing digital media led to sudden growth. Statistics produced in 2012 and 2013 showed that digital marketing continued to grow significantly.

With the development of social media in the 2000s, such as LinkedIn, Facebook, YouTube, and Twitter, consumers became highly dependent on digital electronics in their daily lives. Therefore, they expected a seamless user experience across different channels for searching product information. The change in customer behavior improved the diversification of marketing technology.

Digital media growth was estimated at 4.5 trillion online ads served annually with digital media spending at 48% growth in 2010. An increasing portion of advertising stems from businesses employing Online Behavioural Advertising (OBA) to tailor advertising for internet users, but OBA raises concerns about consumer privacy and data protection.

=== 2020s ===
In the 2020s, AI-generated responses began to be offered as a replacement for simple search engine results. Digital marketers developed methods known as generative engine optimization (GEO) or answer engine optimization (AEO) to market via these tools.

== Brand awareness ==
One of the key objectives of modern digital marketing is to raise brand awareness, the extent to which customers and the public are familiar with and recognize a particular brand.

Enhancing brand awareness is important in digital marketing, and marketing in general, because of its impact on brand perception and consumer decision-making.

== Channels ==
Digital marketing channels are systems based on the Internet that create, accelerate, and transmit product value from producers to consumers through digital networks. Digital marketing is facilitated by multiple channels, as an advertiser's core objective is to find channels which result in maximum two-way communication and a better overall ROI for the brand. There are many digital marketing channels available.

Digital marketing allows consumers to give back feedback to the firm on a community-based site or straight directly to the firm via email. Firms seeking this long-term communication relationship use multiple promotional strategies related to their target consumer as well as word-of-mouth marketing.

=== Affiliate marketing ===
Affiliate marketing is perceived to not be considered a safe, reliable, and easy means of marketing through online platforms due to a lack of reliability in terms of affiliates that can produce the demanded number of new customers. As a result of this risk and bad affiliates, brands are left prone to exploitation in terms of claiming commission that is not honestly acquired. Legal means may offer some protection against this, yet there are limitations in recovering any losses or investment. Despite this, affiliate marketing allows brands to market towards smaller publishers and websites with smaller traffic.

=== Display advertising ===
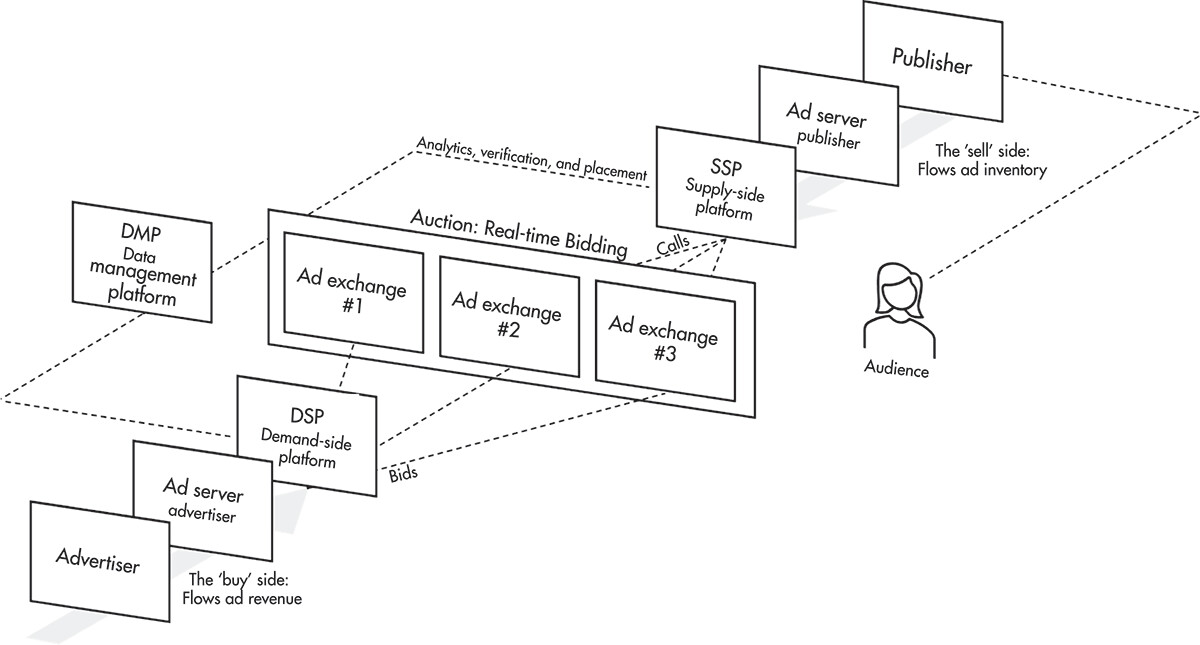
Digital advertising technologies support the real-time bidding infrastructure used in digital display advertising.

As the term implies, online display advertising deals with showcasing promotional messages or ideas to the consumer on the internet. This includes a wide range of advertisements like advertising blogs, networks, interstitial ads, contextual data, ads on search engines, classified or dynamic advertisements, etc. The method can target specific audience tuning in from different types of locals to view a particular advertisement, the variations can be found as the most productive element of this method.

=== Email marketing ===
Email marketing is considered cheap compared to other forms of digital marketing. It is also a way to rapidly communicate a message such as their value proposition to existing or potential customers. Yet this channel of communication may be perceived by recipients to be bothersome and irritating, especially to new or potential customers, therefore the success of email marketing is reliant on the language and visual appeal applied. In terms of visual appeal, there are indications that using graphics/visuals that are relevant to the message—yet less visual graphics to be applied with initial emails—are more effective, in-turn creating a relatively personal feel to the email. In terms of language, the style is the main factor in determining how captivating the email is. Using a casual tone invokes a warmer, gentler and more inviting feel to the email, compared to a more formal tone.

=== Search engine marketing ===
Search engine marketing (SEM) is a form of Internet marketing that involves the promotion of websites by increasing their visibility in search engine results pages (SERPs) primarily through paid advertising. SEM may incorporate Search engine optimization, which adjusts or rewrites website content and site architecture to achieve a higher ranking in search engine results pages to enhance pay per click (PPC) listings.

=== Social media marketing ===
The term 'digital marketing' has a number of marketing facets, as it supports different channels, social media being among these. Social media marketing involve the use of social media channels (Facebook, Twitter, Pinterest, Instagram, Google+, etc.) to market products or services. It is a procedure wherein strategies are made and executed to draw in traffic for a website or to gain the attention of buyers over the web using different social media platforms.

A social networking service is an online platform which people use to build social networks or social relations with other people who share similar personal or career interests, activities, backgrounds or real-life connections.

=== In-game advertising ===
In-game advertising is defined as the "inclusion of products or brands within a digital game." A game allows brands or products to place ads within it, either in a subtle manner or in the form of an advertisement banner.

There are many factors that exist in whether brands are successful in the advertising of their brand/product, these being:

- Type of game
- Technical platform
- 3-D and 4-D technology
- Game genre
- Congruity of brand and game
- Prominence of advertising within the game

Individual factors consist of attitudes towards placement advertisements, game involvement, product involvement, flow, or entertainment. The attitude towards the advertising also takes the displayed message and the attitude towards the game into account. The game's enjoyability determines how the brand is perceived; if the game is not very enjoyable, the consumer may subconsciously have a negative attitude towards the brand/product being advertised. In terms of integrated marketing communication, the "integration of advertising in digital games into the general advertising, communication, and marketing strategy of the firm" results in more clarity about the brand/product and creates a larger overall effect.

=== Online public relations ===
The use of the internet to communicate with both potential and current customers in the public realm.

=== Video advertising ===
This type of advertising, in terms of digital/online means, are advertisements that play on online videos such as YouTube videos. This type of marketing has seen an increase in popularity over time. Online video advertising usually consists of three types:

- Pre-roll advertisements, which play before the video is watched
- Mid-roll advertisements, which play during the video
- Post-roll advertisements, which play after the video is watched

Post-roll advertisements were shown to have better brand recognition in relation to the other types, whereas "ad-context congruity/incongruity plays an important role in reinforcing ad memorability". Due to selective attention from viewers, there is the likelihood that the message may not be received.

Video advertising disrupts the viewing experience of the video, and attempting to avoid them is difficult. How a consumer interacts with online video advertising can come down to three stages: Pre-attention, attention, and behavioral decision. These online advertisements give the brand/business options and choices. These consist of length, position, adjacent video content which all directly affect the effectiveness of the produced advertisement time, therefore manipulating these variables will yield different results. The length of the advertisement has been shown to affect memorability, whereas a longer duration resulted in increased brand recognition.

Due to its nature of interrupting the viewing experience, this type of advertising is likely to make consumers feel as if their experiences are being interrupted or invaded, creating negative perception of the brand. These advertisements are also available to be shared by viewers. Sharing these videos can be equated to the online version of word by mouth marketing, extending the number of people reached. Sharing videos creates six different outcomes: these being "pleasure, affection, inclusion, escape, relaxation, and control". Videos that have entertainment value are more likely to be shared, yet pleasure is the strongest motivator to pass videos on. Creating a 'viral' trend from a mass amount of a brand advertisement can maximize the outcome of an online video advertisement, whether it be a positive or a negative outcome.

=== Native advertising ===
This involves the placement of paid content that replicates the look, feel, and oftentimes, the voice of a platform's existing content. It is most effective when used on digital platforms like websites, newsletters, and social media. This can be somewhat controversial, as some critics feel it intentionally deceives consumers.

=== Content marketing ===
This is an approach to marketing that focuses on gaining and retaining customers by offering helpful content to customers that improves the buying experience and creates brand awareness. A brand may use this approach to hold a customer's attention with the goal of influencing potential purchase decisions.

=== Sponsored content ===
This utilises content created and paid for by a brand to promote a specific product or service.

=== Inbound marketing ===
A market strategy that involves using content as a means to attract customers to a brand or product. This requires extensive research into the behaviors, interests, and habits of the brand's target market.

=== SMS marketing ===
Although the popularity is decreasing day by day, SMS marketing still plays a large role in bringing new users, providing direct updates, providing new offers, etc.

=== Push notifications ===
Push notifications are responsible for bringing new and abandoned customers through smart segmentation. Many online brands use this to provide personalised appeals depending on the scenario of customer acquisition.

== Regulation ==
Digital marketing used to rely primarily on self-regulation included in the ICC Code, which included rules that apply to marketing communications using digital interactive media. However, self-regulation has proved largely ineffective, leading to the consolidation of market power in a few firms, including Google, which has been determined to hold monopolies in search marketing and digital advertising. While self-regulation codes still exist, government regulation is increasing in multiple jurisdictions, including California's legislation on targeting advertising online. In Europe, digital marketing is regulated through multiple codes, of which the most important is the Digital Services Act, which entered into force on 17 February 2024. Other regulations focus on user privacy and data management such as the General Data Protection Regulation (GDPR).

A 2023 European Commission study on digital advertising reported that extensive collection of personal data, tracking and profiling can have consequences for data protection and privacy. The study also noted limited independent evidence that extensive tracking and profiling provide significant advantages over advertising models that do not rely on these practices, and called for greater transparency, accountability and user control over personal data.

== Strategy ==
=== Planning ===
Digital marketing planning is a term used in marketing management. It describes the first stage of forming a digital marketing strategy for the wider digital marketing system. The difference between digital and traditional marketing planning is that it uses digitally based communication tools and technology such as Social, Web, Mobile, Scannable Surface. Nevertheless, both are aligned with the vision, the mission of the company and the overarching business strategy.

=== Stages of planning ===
Dr. Dave Chaffey, an author on marketing topics, has suggested that successful digital marketing strategies undergo digital marketing planning (DMP), which is a three-stage approach: Opportunity, Strategy, and Action. This generic strategic approach often has phases of situation review, goal setting, strategy formulation, resource allocation and monitoring.

==== Opportunity ====
To create an effective DMP, a business first needs to review the marketplace and set SMART (specific, measurable, actionable, relevant, and time-bound) objectives. They can set SMART objectives by reviewing the current benchmarks and key performance indicators (KPIs) of the company and competitors. It is pertinent that the analytics used for the KPIs be customized to the type, objectives, mission, and vision of the company.

Companies can scan for marketing and sales opportunities by reviewing their own outreach as well as influencer outreach. This means they have competitive advantage because they are able to analyse their co-marketers' influence and brand associations.

To seize the opportunity, the firm should summarize its current customers' personas and purchase journey from this they are able to deduce their digital marketing capability.

==== Strategy ====
A planned digital strategy is where a company expresses clearly what they are offering customers online e.g., brand positioning. The marketing mix is a framework which can be used to facilitate this.

==== Action ====
The third and final stage requires the firm to set a budget and management systems. These must be measurable touchpoints, such as the audience reached across all digital platforms. Furthermore, marketers must ensure the budget and management systems are integrating the paid, owned, and earned media of the company. The Action and final stage of planning also requires the company to set in place measurable content creation e.g. oral, visual or written online media.

=== Understanding the market ===
One way marketers can reach out to consumers and understand their thought process is through what is called an empathy map. An empathy map is a four-step process. The first step is through asking questions that the consumer would be thinking in their demographic. The second step is to describe the feelings that the consumer may be having. The third step is to think about what the consumer would say in their situation. The final step is to imagine what the consumer will try to do based on the other three steps. This map is so marketing teams can put themselves in their target demographics shoes. Web Analytics are also a very important way to understand consumers. They show the habits that people have online for each website. One particular form of these analytics is predictive analytics which helps marketers figure out what route consumers are on. This uses the information gathered from other analytics and then creates different predictions of what people will do so that companies can strategize on what to do next, according to the people's trends.

== Sharing economy ==
The "sharing economy" refers to an economic pattern that aims to obtain a resource that is not fully used. Nowadays, the sharing economy has had an unimagined effect on many traditional elements including labor, industry, and distribution system. This effect is not negligible that some industries are obviously under threat. The sharing economy is influencing the traditional marketing channels by changing the nature of some specific concept including ownership, assets, and recruitment.

Digital marketing channels and traditional marketing channels are similar in function that the value of the product or service is passed from the original producer to the end user by a kind of supply chain. Digital Marketing channels, however, consist of internet systems that create, promote, and deliver products or services from producer to consumer through digital networks. Increasing changes to marketing channels has been a significant contributor to the expansion and growth of the sharing economy. Such changes to marketing channels has prompted unprecedented and historic growth. In addition to this typical approach, the built-in control, efficiency and low cost of digital marketing channels is an essential features in the application of sharing economy.

Digital marketing channels within the sharing economy are typically divided into three domains including, e-mail, social media, and search engine marketing or SEM.

- E-mail – A form of direct marketing characterized as being informative, promotional, and often a means of customer relationship management. Organization can update the activity or promotion information to the user by subscribing the newsletter mail that happened in consuming. Success is reliant upon a company's ability to access contact information from its past, present, and future clientele.
- Social media – Social media has the capability to reach a larger audience in a shorter time frame than traditional marketing channels. This makes social media a powerful tool for consumer engagement and the dissemination of information.
- Search engine marketing (SEM) – Requires more specialized knowledge of the technology embedded in online platforms. This marketing strategy requires long-term commitment and dedication to the ongoing improvement of a company's digital presence.

Other emerging digital marketing channels, particularly branded mobile apps, have excelled in the sharing economy. Branded mobile apps are created specifically to initiate engagement between customers and the company. This engagement is typically facilitated through entertainment, information, or market transaction.

== See also ==
- Business analytics – Concept in business analytics
- Customer data platform – Software creating a unified customer database accessible to other systems
- Digital marketing engineer
- Digital privacy – Data protection and control
- Multichannel marketing
- Interactive marketing – Marketing strategy allowing consumers to directly connect with a company
- Marketing strategy – Organizational efforts to increase sales
- Mobile marketing – Multi-channel online marketing technique
- Online advertising – Form of advertising that uses the Internet
- User intent – A user's goal in making a search query
- Visual marketing
