= Marketing automation =

Software for automating repetitive marketing tasks

Marketing automation refers to software platforms and technologies that marketing departments and organizations use to automate repetitive tasks and to run campaigns across channels such as email, SMS, chatbots, and social media, including tracking, web analytics, lead scoring, campaign management, and reporting. It often integrates with customer relationship management (CRM) and customer data platform (CDP) software.

== Overview ==
Marketing automation tracks top-of-funnel activities to drive prospects to sales. This is contrasted with CRM, which manages information about the prospect and their position in the sales cycle.

The use of marketing automation makes processes that would otherwise be performed manually much more efficient and enables new processes. Marketing automation can be defined as the use of technology to automate several repetitive tasks that are carried out regularly as part of a marketing campaign.

Marketing automation platforms allow marketers to automate and simplify client communication by managing complex omnichannel marketing strategies with a single tool. Marketing automation assists in areas such as lead generation, segmentation, lead nurturing and lead scoring, relationship marketing, cross-sell and upsell, customer retention, and marketing ROI measurement. Effective marketing automation tools leverage data from a separate or integrated CRM to understand customer impact and preferences. The same platforms are used to schedule campaigns and monitor customer engagement across digital channels.

There are four categories of marketing automation software:

Marketing intelligence
Uses tracking codes in social media, email, and webpages to track the behavior of anyone interested in a product or service to gain a measure of intent. It can record which social media group or thread they followed, which link was clicked on in an email or which search term was used to access a website. Multiple link analysis can then track buyer behavior - following links and multiple threads related to product A, but not B will show an interest only in A. This allows more accurately targeted response and the development of a nurturing program specifically targeted towards their interest and vertical market. This allows businesses to more efficiently and effectively reach target consumers who show, through their internet history behavior, that they will be interested in the company's products.
Marketing automation
Has a focus on moving leads from the top of the marketing funnel through to becoming sales-ready leads at the bottom of the funnel. Prospects are scored, based on their activities, and receive targeted content and messaging, thus nurturing them from first interest through to sale. Commonly used in business-to-business (B2B), business-to-government (B2G), or longer sales cycle business-to-consumer (B2C) sales cycles, marketing automation involves multiple areas of marketing and is really the marriage of email marketing technology coupled with a structured sales process.
Advertising automation
Covers automation of advertising work such as media planning, scheduling, media-mix models, ad serving, and reporting, including with artificial intelligence.
Advanced workflow automation
Covers internal marketing processes such as budgeting and planning, approvals, the marketing calendar, collaboration, and digital-asset creation. These systems often rely on a CRM or commercial operations management administrator to configure rules that assign work to sales and marketing staff. What the team can take on still depends on staffing and on whether people complete the tasks the system assigns.

=== Rules-based automation and agentic systems ===
Rules-based marketing automation runs a predetermined action when a condition is met. A common case is an email series or other message sent because a person did something specific, such as viewing a product and leaving the site.

Agentic systems are a different arrangement. A software agent is given a business objective and can call other systems, rather than firing a single stored rule. In advertising, the IAB Tech Lab's Agentic Advertising Management Protocols (AAMP) are a standards effort for buyer and seller agents that plan, negotiate, and buy media, including programmatic deals, using existing advertising specifications.

In media buying, the same split is a fixed threshold — if cost per acquisition exceeds a set level, reduce the bid — versus an agent aimed at a goal such as incremental return. That agent can update recommendations as experiment results and marketing mix modeling change, with a person approving budget moves. An agent that optimizes last-click or platform-reported return will scale those metrics' biases unless the signal is checked against experiments.

=== Effects of GDPR on marketing automation ===
The General Data Protection Regulation (GDPR) took effect in the EU on 25 May 2018. It changed how marketing teams can handle consumer data. An organization that uses marketing automation to process personal data needs a lawful basis. Consent is one basis; a contract or a legitimate interest can be another, depending on the processing. Where the basis is legitimate interest, the organization has to tell people what that interest is. Commercial email also has to comply with the ePrivacy Directive.

=== California Consumer Privacy Act (CCPA) ===
The California Consumer Privacy Act (CCPA) took effect on 1 January 2020. As later amended, it gives California residents the right to know what personal information a business collects, how that information is used and shared, and to opt out of the sale or sharing of it.

=== Impact of marketing automation on consumers ===
Marketing automation personalizes products and messages from data people provide and from behavior companies observe. Klaus Wertenbroch has described that personalization as a commercial opportunity for firms, including finer price discrimination, and as a risk to consumer surplus, equality of opportunity, and personal autonomy and dignity.

== Functionality ==
Marketing automation solutions provide three functions:

Campaign and customer analysis help organizations create appropriate offers and gain insights from information collected during previous campaigns.

Campaign management oversees all customer communications across multiple channels, monitors customer responses, and reports on campaign performance and outcomes.

Data warehousing pulls customer information together from different systems and channels.

=== Examples of automation ===
After a user visits a merchant's website and navigates away, an automated email can be triggered to be sent out to that user. They can be reminded of an abandoned shopping cart, a subscription that is about to expire, or be welcomed if they are a new customer. Coupons and messages can be tailored based on past purchases.

Software can also automate the creation of product landing pages and chatbots for customer support.

== Market size ==
According to Gartner, the B2B marketing automation market grew 15% in 2020, to $2.1 billion. In that September 2021 Magic Quadrant, Gartner placed the following vendors in the Leaders quadrant:

- Adobe (Adobe Marketo Engage)
- Creatio (Marketing Creatio)
- HubSpot (Marketing Hub)
- Oracle (Oracle Eloqua)
- Salesforce (Pardot)

== See also ==
- AI agent
- Artificial intelligence in marketing
- Demand generation
- Lead scoring
- Outbound marketing
- Online advertising
- Real-time marketing
- Predictive analytics
- Customer retention
- Data integration
- Marketing mix modeling
- Mobile marketing automation
- Email marketing
