= List of radio comedies =

This is a list of radio comedies.

== Produced independently ==
- Man of the People: The Only-Recently Discovered Secret Political Recordings of Acting Mayor Francis "Woody" Woodson
- The Sound of Young America
- The Comedy-O-Rama Hour
- The Wireless Theatre Company
- The Auntie Mabel Hour, broadcast on the 1960s pirate radio station Radio City, off the British coast.

== Australia ==
=== Produced by ABC (Australia) ===
- The Idiot Weekly
- Yes, What?/The Fourth Form at St Percy's (discontinued)
- Coodabeen Champions

== Canada ==
- Double Exposure
- Frantic Times
- The Royal Canadian Air Farce
- Spring Thaw
- Great Conversations with Joseph the Irish Potato Farmer

=== Produced by or for the CBC ===
- CBC Festival of Comedy
- CBC Festival of Funny
- Canadia: 2056
- Chas Lawther's Stand Up Documentaries
- The Chumps Without a Net
- The Dead Dog Cafe Comedy Hour
- Double Exposure (comedy series)
- The Frantics Frantic Times, Fran of the Fundy, and The Frantics Look at History
- Gary & Ivan's Winnebago Tour
- Great Eastern
- Growing Up and Having Babies
- The Happy Gang
- Here Come the Seventies (radio show)
- How to Seem Smart
- The Irrelevant Show
- Laugh in a Half
- Madly Off in All Directions
- Mr. Interesting's Guide to the Continental United States
- The Muckraker
- The Norm
- Radio Free Vestibule
- Rick and Pete Grow Up and Have Babies
- The Royal Canadian Air Farce
- Running with Scissors with Mr. Interesting
- Steve, The First
- Steve, The Second
- Sunny Days and Nights
- This Hour Has 17 Programs
- Those People Across the Street
- The Vinyl Cafe
- What a Week

== Ireland ==
=== Produced by or for RTÉ ===
- The Apocalypse of Bill Lizard
- The Comedy Improv Radio Show
- Beyond the Back of Beyond
- Scrap Saturday

== New Zealand ==
- ZM - Hamish and Andy
- RNZ Comedy

== United Kingdom ==
- The 99p Challenge
- Absolute Power
- Babblewick Hall
- Beyond Our Ken
- The Cabaret of Dr Caligari
- The Clitheroe Kid
- Clare in the Community
- Count Arthur Strong's Radio Show
- Dead Ringers
- Elastic Planet
- The Glums
- The Goon Show
- Hancock's Half Hour
- Hello, Cheeky!
- The Hitchhiker's Guide to the Galaxy
- I'm Sorry I Haven't A Clue
- I'm Sorry, I'll Read That Again
- It Sticks Out Half a Mile
- It's That Man Again
- Just a Minute
- Knowing Me, Knowing You
- Ladies of Letters
- Lenin of the Rovers
- Little Britain
- Living with the Enemy
- The Mark Steel Revolution
- The Mark Steel Solution
- The Masterson Inheritance
- The Men from the Ministry
- The Mighty Boosh
- My Word!
- The Navy Lark
- Nebulous
- The News Huddlines
- The News Quiz
- The Now Show
- Old Harry's Game
- On the Hour
- On the Town with the League of Gentlemen
- Radio Active
- Revolting People
- Round the Horne
- Smelling of Roses
- The Sunday Format
- Truly, Madly, Bletchley

=== Produced by or for the BBC ===
- 15 Minute Musical
- 15 Minutes of Misery
- 15 Storeys High
- 4 at the Store
- The 99p Challenge
- Absolute Power
- Alison and Maud
- And Now in Colour
- The Arthur Smith Lectures
- Beat The Kids
- Boothby Graffoe, In No Particular Order and Big Booth Too
- The Brothers
- The Burkiss Way
- Cabin Pressure
- Charm Offensive
- The Christopher Marlowe Mysteries
- Clare in the Community
- Clive Anderson's Comedy Revolutions
- Creme de la Crime
- Concrete Cow
- Comedians' Comedians
- Comedy Album Heroes
- Comedy Showcase
- The Consultants
- Dead Ringers
- Deep Trouble (radio comedy series)
- Delve Special
- Dial M For Pizza
- Educating Archie
- Ed Reardon's Week
- ElvenQuest
- Fags, Mags and Bags
- Fist of Fun
- Flight of the Conchords
- Flywheel, Shyster, and Flywheel
- Four Joneses and a Jenkins
- The Game's Up
- Genius
- Giles Wemmbley Hogg Goes Off
- Geoffrey Boycott's Proper World History of Cricket
- Getting Nowhere Fast
- Goodness Gracious Me
- The Goon Show
- Hancock's Half Hour
- The Harpoon
- Hazelbeach
- The Hitch Hiker's Guide to the Galaxy
- The Hole in the Wall Gang
- The House of Milton Jones
- The Hudson and Pepperdine Show
- Hut 33
- I'm Sorry I Haven't a Clue
- I'm Sorry, I'll Read That Again
- In One Ear
- It's Been a Bad Week
- It's That Man Again
- Jackie Mason
- Jammin'
- Jeremy Hardy Speaks to the Nation
- Just a Minute
- "John Finnemore's Souvenir Programme"
- King Street Junior
- Knowing Me, Knowing You
- The League of Gentlemen
- Lionel Nimrod's Inexplicable World
- Lines From My Grandfather's Forehead
- Linda Smith's A Brief History of Timewasting
- Little Britain
- Loose Ends
- Mackay the New
- Man of Soup
- The Mark Steel Lectures
- The Mark Steel Revolution
- The Mark Steel Solution
- The Mel and Sue Thing
- Men from the Ministry
- Mitch Benn's Crimes Against Music
- That Mitchell and Webb Sound
- Much Binding in the Marsh
- The Museum of Everything
- The National Theatre of Brent
- The Navy Lark
- Nebulous
- Newsjack
- The News Huddlines
- The News Quiz
- Nightcap
- The Now Show
- Old Harry's Game
- The Omar Khayyam Show
- On the Hour
- Party
- Paperback Hell
- People Like Us
- Police 5...to 12
- The Problem with Adam Bloom
- Quote... Unquote
- Radio Active
- Recorded for Training Purposes
- The Remains of Foley and McColl
- Robin and Wendy's Wet Weekends
- Room 101
- Ross Noble Goes Global
- Round the Horne
- Route One, USA
- Saturday Night Fry
- The SitCrom
- Son of Cliche
- Steptoe and Son
- The Sunday Format
- Take It From Here
- Think the Unthinkable
- The Unbelievable Truth
- The Very World of Milton Jones
- We've Been Here Before
- Whose Line Is It Anyway?
- World of Pub
- Yes Minister (adapted from television)
- You'll Have Had Your Tea (a spin-off from I'm Sorry I Haven't a Clue)

=== Produced by or for Resonance FM ===
- Entrance of the Gladiators

== USA ==
- The Abbott and Costello Show
- The Adventures of Ozzie and Harriet
- The Adventures of Topper
- Amos & Andy
- The Alan Young Show
- The Aldrich Family
- Archie Andrews
- Audience of Two
- Avalon Time
- The Baby Snooks Show
- The Best Show with Tom Scharpling
- The Bob Burns Show
- The Bob Hope Show/The Pepsodent Show
- Bob & Ray
- Beulah
- The Bickersons
- The Billie Burke Show
- Block and Sully
- Blondie
- Blue Ribbon Town
- That Brewster Boy
- Burns and Allen
- The Candid Microphone
- The Charlie McCarthy Show
- The Chase and Sanborn Hour
- Chickenman
- The Credibility Gap
- The Cuckoo Hour
- The Dr Demento Radio Show
- Duffy's Tavern
- The Durante-Moore Show
- Easy Aces
- The Eddie Cantor Show
- Fibber McGee and Molly
- The Firesign Theatre
- Flywheel, Shyster, and Flywheel
- The Fire Chief/Ed Wynn Show
- The Fred Allen Show
- Forever Ernest
- Gasoline Alley
- The Goldbergs
- The Great Gildersleeve
- Granby's Green Acres
- The Grumps
- The Halls of Ivy
- Here's Morgan
- It Pays to Be Ignorant
- The Jack Benny Show
- The Jack Pearl Show/Baron Munchausen
- Jean Shepherd
- The Joe Penner Show
- Joe and Mabel
- The Judy Canova Show
- The Jumbo Fire Chief Program
- The Life of Riley
- Life with Luigi
- Lum and Abner
- Major Hoople
- Meet Me at Parky's
- The Mel Blanc Show
- The Milton Berle Show/Three Ring Time/Let Yourself Go
- The Morey Amsterdam Show
- My Favorite Husband
- My Friend Irma
- The National Lampoon Radio Hour
- Nutmeg Junction
- Our Miss Brooks
- People Are Funny
- The Phil Harris-Alice Faye Show
- The Raleigh Cigarette Program/The Red Skelton Show
- Sam 'n' Henry
- Seven Second Delay
- Smackout
- The SpeLcast
- The Stan Freberg Show
- Stoopnagle and Budd
- Stop Me If You've Heard This One
- Talkback with Jerry Galvin
- Texaco Star Theater
- Tommy Riggs and Betty Lou
- Vic and Sade
- You Bet Your Life

=== Produced by or for US public radio ===
- A Prairie Home Companion (Minnesota Public Radio)
- Car Talk
- Comedy College (Minnesota Public Radio)
- Le Show (KCRW)
- NonProductive (WRSU-FM)
- Wait Wait... Don't Tell Me! (Chicago Public Radio)
- The Comedy-O-Rama Hour (Joe Bevilacqua)

=== Comedy Talk Radio ===
- The Adam Carolla Show
- Armstrong & Getty
- The Bob & Tom Show
- Don and Mike Show
- The Howard Stern Show
- Imus in the Morning
- Mancow's Morning Madhouse
- The Me and Him Show
- The Mark & Brian Show
- Opie and Anthony
- Ron and Fez

=== Golden Age Variety Shows That Featured Comedians ===
- The Big Show
- The Danny Kaye Show
- The Dodge Victory Hour
- Ed Sullivan Entertains
- The Fleischmann's Yeast Hour/ The Rudy Vallee Show
- The George Jessel Show
- The Gulf Headliners
- The Jack Carson Show
- The Kate Smith Show
- Kraft Music Hall
- The Martin and Lewis Show
- Monitor
- The Ziegfeld Follies of the Air

=== Other ===
- Loveline
- Hour of Slack

== See also ==
- Lists of comedy films
- List of comedy television series
- List of theatrical comedies
