= Lists of comedies =

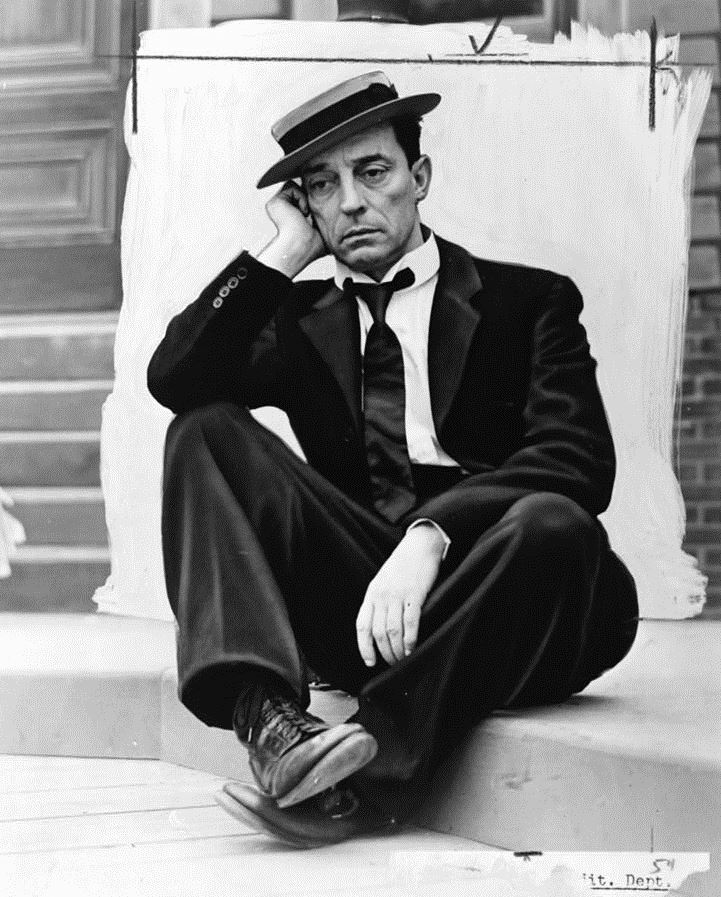
The film comedian Buster Keaton

Lists of comedies cover comedy performances in different media and genres.

== Media ==
- Lists of comedy films
- List of comedy television series
- List of comedy-drama television series
- List of radio comedies
- List of theatrical comedies

== Genre ==
- List of comedy horror films
- List of comedy–mystery films
- List of comedy anime
- List of science fiction comedy films
- List of romantic comedy films
- List of situation comedies
- List of teen sitcoms
