= Talkback =

Talkback or talk back may refer to:

- Talkback (album), a 1983 album by the Canadian band the Spoons
- Talk Back (album), a 2016 album by Kembe X
- "Talkback", a 2023 song by 6lack from Since I Have a Lover
- Talkback, an alternate name for Marvel Comics superhero Chase Stein
- Talkback (recording), an audio system used in recording studios for communications
- Talkback (television production), an audio system used in TV shows
- TalkBack Reader Response System, talkback system for internet reader response
- Talk radio, radio format
- Talkback (production company), a British television production company which merged with Thames Television
- Talkback Thames, a company resulting from the merger of Talkback Productions and Thames Television
- Google TalkBack, an accessibility service on Android

== Programs ==
- Talkback (BBC Radio Ulster), a radio program in Northern Ireland, on air since 1986
- Talkback (TV show), a Philippine interactive current affairs-talk show television program broadcast on the ABS-CBN News Channel 2000-2020
- Talkback Classroom, an Australian radio program
- Talkback Live, a CNN talk show on air from 1994 to 2003
- Talkback with Jerry Galvin, an American comedic radio show, on air in the mid-1980s
- Talkback 16, viewer feedback segment of WNEP-TV's news broadcasts

== See also ==
- Trash talk
