= Free software (disambiguation) =

Free software may refer to one of the following:

- Freely redistributable software
  - Free and open-source software
    - Free software, defined by the Free Software Foundation, is software which may be used, copied, studied, modified and redistributed ("free as in free speech"), but is not necessarily available for no charge. If distributed, source code must be made available for no charge.
    - Open-source software, similar to free software, except that source code is not required to be distributed with executables.
- Freeware, software available at no charge, but not necessarily with the rights to modify and redistribute it
- Free Software Magazine
