= Direct marketing =

Model of communicating discounts and other sales offers

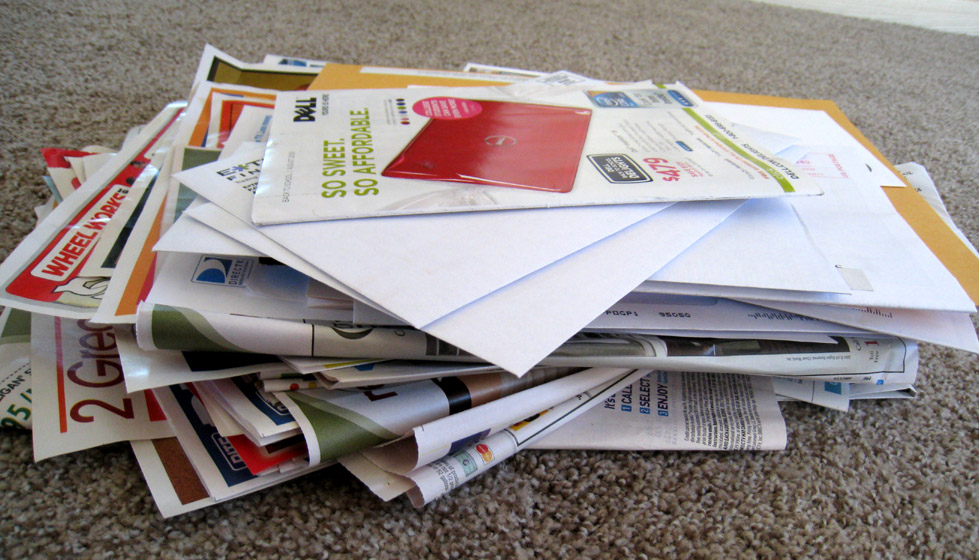
A pile of advertising mail

Direct marketing is a form of communicating an offer, where organizations communicate directly to a pre-selected customer and supply a method for a direct response. Among practitioners, it is also known as direct response marketing. In contrast to direct marketing, advertising is more of a mass-message nature. Response channels include toll-free telephone numbers, reply cards, reply forms to be sent in an envelope, websites, and email addresses.

The prevalence of direct marketing and the unwelcome nature of some communications has led to regulations and laws such as the CAN-SPAM Act, requiring that consumers in the United States be allowed to opt-out.

== Overview ==
Intended targets are selected from larger populations based on vendor-defined criteria, including average income for a particular ZIP code, purchasing history, and presence on other lists. The goal is "to sell directly to consumers" without letting others "join (the) parade."

Compared to general marketing, which is not as targeted, direct marketing is targeted to speak directly with the consumer.

== History ==
Direct marketing, using catalogues, was practiced in 15th-century Europe. The publisher Aldus Manutius of Venice printed a catalogue of the books he offered for sale. In 1667, the English gardener, William Lucas, published a seed catalogue, which he mailed to his customers to inform them of his prices. Catalogues spread to colonial America, where Benjamin Franklin is believed to have been the first cataloguer in British America. In 1744, he produced a catalogue of scientific and academic books.

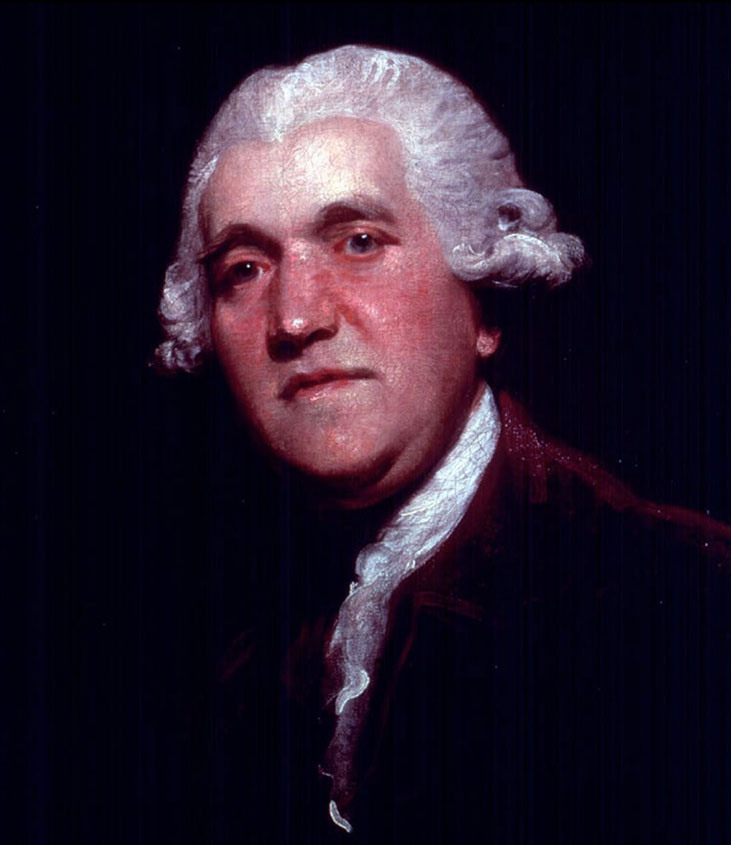
18th-century English entrepreneur and potter Josiah Wedgwood developed modern marketing techniques and was an early advocate of direct mail.

Meeting the demands of the consumer revolution and the growth in wealth of the middle classes helped drive the Industrial Revolution in Britain. Following the Industrial Revolution of the late 18th-century, a growing middle class created new demand for goods and services. Entrepreneurs, including Matthew Boulton and pottery manufacturer Josiah Wedgwood, pioneered many of the marketing strategies used today, including direct marketing.

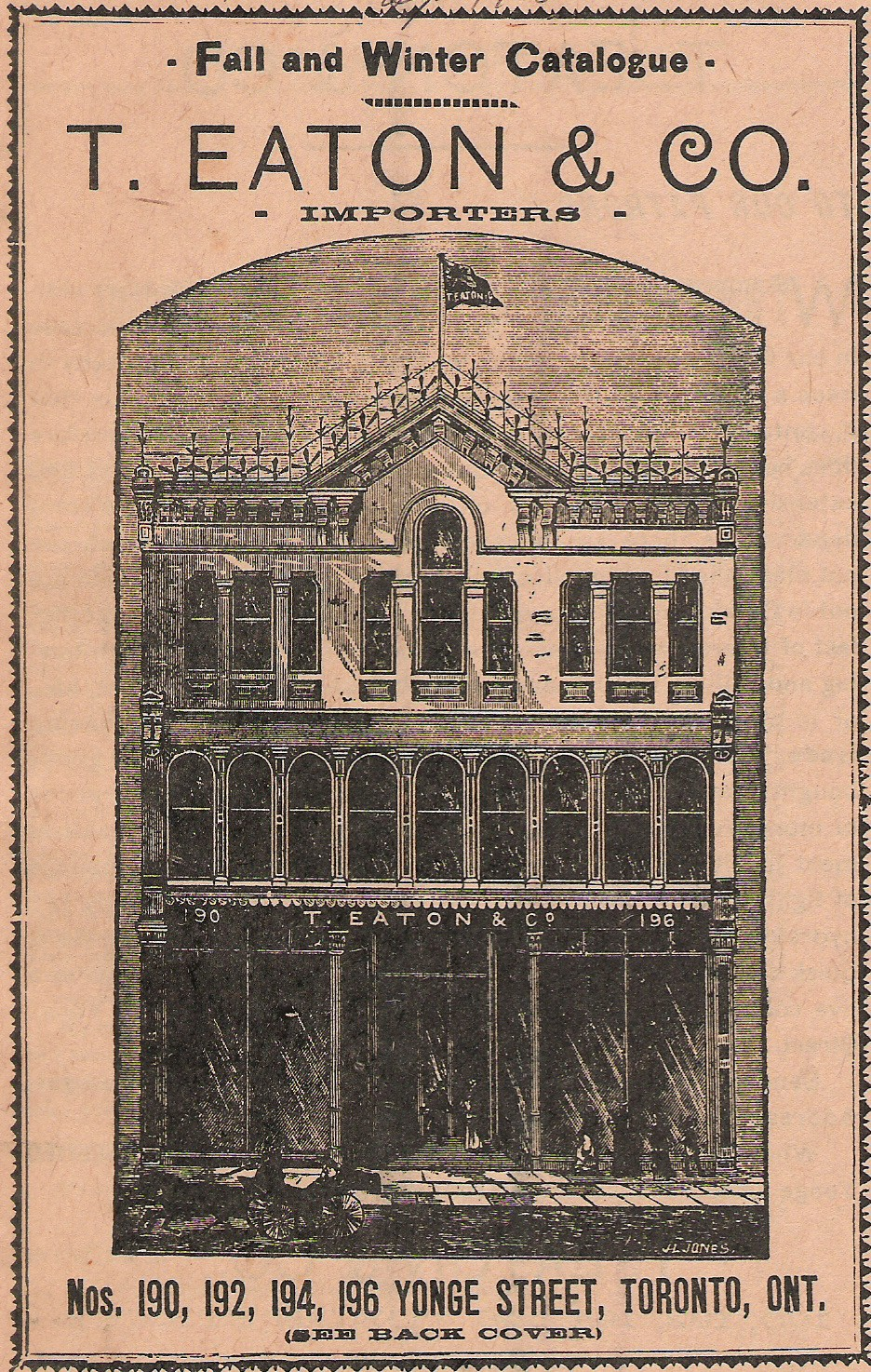
Cover of Eatons Catalogue, Ontario, Canada, 1884

The Welsh entrepreneur Pryce Pryce-Jones set up the first modern mail order in 1861. Starting as an apprentice to a local draper in Newtown, Wales, he took over the business in 1856 and renamed it the Royal Welsh Warehouse, selling local Welsh flannel.

Improvements in transportation systems, combined with the advent of the Uniform Penny Post in the mid-19th century, provided the necessary conditions for rapid growth in mail order services. In 1861, Pryce-Jones hit upon a unique method of selling his wares. He distributed catalogs of his wares across the country, allowing people to choose the items they wished and order them via post. Pryce-Jones would then dispatch the goods to the customer via the railways. It was an ideal way to meet the needs of customers in isolated rural locations who were either too busy or unable to get to Newtown to shop directly. This was the world's first mail-order business, an idea which would change the nature of retail in the coming century.

One of Pryce-Jones' most popular products was the Euklisia Rug, the forerunner of the modern sleeping bag, which Pryce-Jones exported around the world, at one point landing a contract with the Russian Army for 60,000 rugs. By 1880, he had more than 100,000 customers and his success was rewarded in 1887 with a knighthood.

In the 19th century, the American retailer, Aaron Montgomery Ward, believed that using the technique of selling products directly to the customer at appealing prices could, if executed effectively and efficiently, revolutionize the market industry and therefore be used as a model for marketing products and creating customer loyalty. The term "direct marketing" was coined long after Montgomery Ward's time.

In 1872, Ward produced the first mail-order catalog for his Montgomery Ward mail order business. By buying goods and reselling them directly to customers, Ward was removing the middlemen at the general store and, to the benefit of customers, drastically lowering prices. The Direct Mail Advertising Association, the predecessor of the present-day Direct Marketing Association, was first established in 1917. Third class bulk mail postage rates were established in 1928.

In 1967, Lester Wunderman identified, named, and defined the term "direct marketing". Wunderman—considered to be the father of contemporary direct marketing—is behind the creation of the toll-free 1-800 number and numerous loyalty marketing programs including the Columbia Record Club, the magazine subscription card, and the American Express Customer Rewards program.

== Objectives ==
Direct Marketing has a few objectives, such as selling, generating leads, and developing relationships with customers.

Selling is a major objective of direct marketing. An example of this can be a newspaper with an advertisement promoting a certain product to buy.

Another objective of direct marketing is to both generate leads and qualify leads. Leads that are qualified can also be identified as prospective customers.

Developing relationships with customers is also an objective of a direct marketing campaign. If a direct marketing campaign is executed correctly, the loyalty ladder shows that a target company can go from suspects to prospects to customers to clients and finally to advocates.

== Challenges and solutions ==
List brokers provide names and contact information, but their services need to be contrasted to expected "return on investment."

Success can vary based on factors such as:

- Offer (best offer may yield up to 3 times the response, as compared with the worst offer)
- Timing (best timing for the campaign may yield up to 2 times the response, as compared with the worst timing)
- Ease of response (best/multiple ways offered to respond may yield up to 1.35 times the response, as compared with not-so-friendly response mechanism/s)
- Creativity
- Media employed. The medium/media used to deliver a message can significantly impact responses. It is difficult to truly personalize a DRTV or radio message. One can even try sending a personalized message via email or text, but a high-quality direct-mail envelope and letter are more likely to generate a response in this scenario.
- Fulfillment – Mail fulfillment is the physical act of printing and then the postage and distribution of it. This is an important stage in the Direct Marketing process. This stage is known as direct mail fulfillment – and includes tasks such as data cleansing, material preparation, collation, folding, closing, bundling, packaging, and courier collection. This stage is also not to be overlooked, as it can truly define the success of a direct marketing campaign.

Some direct marketers use individual "opt-out" lists, variable printing, and more targeted list practices to improve success rates. Additionally, to avoid unwanted mailings, the marketing industry has established preference services that give customers more control over the marketing communications they receive by mail.

The term "junk mail", referring to unsolicited commercial ads delivered via the post office or directly deposited in consumers' mailboxes, can be traced back to 1954. The term "spam," meaning "unsolicited commercial e-mail," can be traced back to March 31, 1993, although in its first few months it merely referred to inadvertently posting the same message so many times on UseNet that the repetition effectively drowned out the normal flow of conversation.

To address the concerns of unwanted emails or spam, in 2003, the US Congress enacted the Controlling the Assault of Non-Solicited Pornography and Marketing (CAN-SPAM) Act to curb unwanted email messages. Can-Spam gives recipients the ability to stop unwanted emails and sets out tough penalties for violations. Additionally, ISPs and email service providers have developed increasingly effective Email Filtering programs. These filters can interfere with the delivery of email marketing campaigns, even if the person has subscribed to receive them, as legitimate email marketing can possess the same hallmarks as spam. There are a range of email service providers that provide services for legitimate opt-in emailers to avoid being classified as spam.

Consumers have expressed concerns about the privacy and environmental implications of direct marketing. In response to consumer demand and increasing business pressure to increase the effectiveness of reaching the right customer with direct marketing, companies specialize in targeted direct advertising to great effect, reducing advertising budget waste and increasing the effectiveness of delivering a marketing message with better geo-demography information, delivering the advertising message to only the customers interested in the product, service, or event on offer. Additionally, members of the advertising industry have been working to adopt stricter codes regarding online targeted advertising.

== Channels ==
There are many channels that are effective for direct marketing such as: direct mail, telephone, newspaper, magazine, television, radio, and use of the internet.

=== Email marketing ===
Sending marketing messages through email or email marketing is one of the most widely used direct-marketing methods. One reason for email marketing's popularity is that it is relatively inexpensive to design, test, and send an email message. It also allows marketers to deliver messages around the clock and accurately measure responses.

=== Online tools ===
With the expansion of digital technology and tools, direct marketing is increasingly taking place through online channels. Most online advertising is delivered to a focused group of customers and has a trackable response.

- Display Ads are interactive ads that appear on the Web next to content on Web pages or Web services. Formats include static banners, pop-ups, videos, and floating units. Customers can click on the ad to respond directly to the message or to find more detailed information. According to research by eMarketer, Display Advertising, including Social Media display ads, was 45.9% of all ad spending in 2018 and is expected to grow to 60.5% of ad spending by 2023.
- Search: 49% of US spending on Internet ads goes to search, in which advertisers pay for prominent placement among listings in search engines whenever a potential customer enters a relevant search term, allowing ads to be delivered to customers based upon their already-indicated search criteria. This paid placement industry generates more than $10 billion for search companies. Marketers also use search engine optimization to drive traffic to their sites.
- Social Media Sites, such as Facebook and Twitter, also provide opportunities for direct marketers to communicate directly with customers by creating content to which customers can respond.

=== Mobile ===
Through mobile marketing, marketers engage with prospective customers and donors in an interactive manner through a mobile device or network, such as a cellphone, smartphone, or tablet. Types of mobile marketing messages include: SMS (short message service)—marketing communications are sent in the form of text messages, also known as texting. MMS (multi-media message service)—marketing communications are sent in the form of media messages.

In October 2013, the Federal Telephone Consumers Protection Act made it illegal to contact an individual via cell phone without prior express written consent for all telephone calls using an automatic telephone dialing system or a prerecorded voice to deliver a telemarketing message (known as a Robocall) to wireless numbers and residential lines. An existing business relationship does not exempt you from this requirement.

Mobile Applications: Smartphone-based mobile apps contain several types of messages. Push Notifications are direct messages sent to a user either automatically or as part of a campaign. They include transactional, marketing, geo-based, and more. Rich Push Notifications are full HTML Push Notifications. Mobile apps also contain Interactive ads that appear inside the mobile application or app; Location-Based Marketing: marketing messages delivered directly to a mobile device based on the user's location; QR Codes (quick-response barcodes): This is a type of 2D barcode with an encoded link that can be accessed from a smartphone. This technology is increasingly being used for everything from special offers to product information. Mobile Banner Ads: Like standard banner ads for desktop Web pages but smaller to fit on mobile screens and run on the mobile content network

=== Telemarketing ===
Another common form of direct marketing is telemarketing, in which marketers contact customers by phone. The primary benefit for businesses is increased lead generation, which helps them increase sales volume and their customer base. The most successful telemarketing service providers focus on generating more "qualified" leads with a higher probability of conversion into actual sales.

In the United States, the National Do Not Call Registry was created in 2003 to offer consumers a choice of whether to receive telemarketing calls at home. The FTC created the National Do Not Call Registry after a comprehensive review of the Telemarketing Sales Rule (TSR). The do-not-call provisions of the TSR cover any plan, program, or campaign to sell goods or services through interstate phone calls.

The 2012 modification, which went into effect on October 16, 2013, stated that prior express written consent will be required for all auto-dialed and/or pre-recorded calls/texts sent/made to cell phones; and for pre-recorded calls made to residential land lines for marketing purposes.

Further, a consumer who does not wish to receive further prerecorded telemarketing calls can "opt out" of receiving such calls by dialing a telephone number (required to be provided in the prerecorded message) to register his or her do-not-call request. The provisions do not cover calls from political organizations or charities.

Canada has its own National Do Not Call List (DNCL). In other countries, it is voluntary, such as the New Zealand Name Removal Service.

==== Voicemail marketing ====
Voicemail marketing emerged from the market prevalence of personal voice mailboxes, and business voicemail systems. One particular form is known as Ringless voicemail. Voice-mail courier is a similar form of voice-mail marketing with both business-to-business and business-to-consumer applications.

=== Broadcast faxing ===
Broadcast faxing, in which faxes are sent to multiple recipients, is now less common than in the past. This is partly due to laws in the United States and elsewhere which regulate its use for consumer marketing. In 2005, President Bush signed into law S.714, the Junk Fax Prevention Act of 2005 (JFPA), which allows marketers to send commercial faxes to those with whom they have an established business relationship (EBR), but imposes some new requirements. These requirements include providing an opt-out notice on the first page of faxes and establishing a system to accept opt-outs at any time of the day. Roughly 2% of direct marketers use faxes for advertising purposes, mostly for business-to-business marketing campaigns.

=== Couponing ===
Couponing is used in print and digital media to elicit a response from the reader. An example is a coupon which the reader receives through the mail and takes to a store's check-out counter to receive a discount.

Digital Coupons: Manufacturers and retailers make coupons available online for electronic orders that can be downloaded and printed. Digital coupons are available on company websites, social media outlets, texts, and email alerts. There are an increasing number of mobile phone applications offering digital coupons for direct use.

Daily Deal Sites offer local and online deals each day, and are becoming increasingly popular. Customers sign up to receive notice of discounts and offers, which are sent daily by email. Purchases are often made using a special coupon code or promotional code. The largest of these sites, Groupon, has over 83 million subscribers.

=== Direct response marketing ===
Direct response marketing is designed to generate immediate consumer responses, with each response (and purchase) measurable and attributable to individual advertisements. This form of marketing is differentiated from other marketing approaches, primarily because there are no intermediaries such as retailers between the buyer and seller, and therefore the buyer must contact the seller directly to purchase products or services. Direct response marketing is delivered through a wide variety of media, including DRTV, radio, mail, print advertising, telemarketing, catalogues, and the Internet.

==== Direct response mail order ====
Mail order in which customers respond by mailing a completed order form to the marketer. Mail order direct response has become more successful in recent years due to internet exposure.

==== Direct response television ====
Direct marketing via television (commonly referred to as DRTV) has two basic forms: long form (usually half-hour or hour-long segments that explain a product in detail and are commonly referred to as infomercials) and short form, which refers to typical 30-second or 60-second commercials that ask viewers for an immediate response (typically to call a phone number on screen or go to a website). TV-response marketing—i.e. infomercials—can be considered a form of direct marketing, since responses are in the form of calls to telephone numbers given on-air. This allows marketers to reasonably conclude that the calls are due to a particular campaign, and enables them to obtain customers' phone numbers as targets for telemarketing. One of the most famous DRTV commercials was for Ginsu Knives by Ginsu Products, Inc. of Rhode Island. Several aspects of ad, such as its use of adding items to the offer and the guarantee of satisfaction were much copied, and came to be considered part of the formula for success with short-form direct-response TV ads (DRTV).

Forms of direct response marketing on television include standard short form television commercials, infomercials and home shopping networks. Short-form direct-response commercials have time lengths ranging from 30 seconds to 2 minutes. Long form infomercials are typically 30 minutes long. An offshoot of the infomercial is the home shopping industry. In this medium, items can potentially be offered with reduced overhead.

==== Direct response radio ====
In direct response radio, ads contain a call to action with a specific tracking mechanism. Often, this tracking mechanism is a "call now" prompt with a toll-free phone number or a unique Web URL. Results of the ad can be tracked in terms of calls, orders, customers, leads, sales, revenue, and profits that result from the airing of those ads.

==== Direct response magazines and newspapers ====
Magazine and newspaper ads often include a direct response call-to-action, such as a toll-free number, a coupon redeemable at a brick-and-mortar store, or a QR code that can be scanned by a mobile device—these methods are all forms of direct marketing, because they elicit a direct and measurable action from the customer.

By 1982, "the rising cost of an industrial sales call" (compared to 1971) led to business press outlets becoming a "primary reference for buying."

==== Other direct response media ====
Other media, such as magazines, newspapers, radio, social media, search engine marketing and e-mail can be used to elicit the response. A survey of large corporations found e-mail to be one of the most effective forms of direct response.

=== Direct mail ===
The term advertising, or direct mail, is used to refer to communications sent to potential customers or donors via the postal service and other delivery services. Direct mail is sent to customers based on criteria such as age, income, location, profession, buying pattern, etc. Direct mail includes advertising circulars, catalogs, free-trial CDs, forced free trials, pre-approved credit card applications, and other unsolicited merchandising invitations delivered by mail to homes and businesses. Bulk mailings are a particularly popular method of promotion for businesses operating in the financial services, home computer, and travel and tourism industries. These mail pieces are a common form of marketing collateral.

In many developed countries, direct mail represents such a significant amount of the total volume of mail that special rate classes have been established. In the United States and United Kingdom, for example, there are bulk mail rates that enable marketers to send mail at rates that are substantially lower than regular first-class rates. In order to qualify for these rates, marketers must format and sort the mail in particular ways—which reduces the handling (and therefore costs) required by the postal service. In the US, marketers send over 90 billion pieces of direct mail per year.

Advertisers often refine direct mail practices into targeted mailing, in which mail is sent out following database analysis to select recipients considered most likely to respond positively. For example, a person who has demonstrated an interest in golf may receive direct mail for golf-related products or perhaps for goods and services that are appropriate for golfers. This use of database analysis is a type of database marketing. The United States Postal Service calls this form of mail "advertising mail" (admail for short).

In 1983, 15.1% of US postal revenue came from direct mail.

=== Insert media ===
Insert media is another form of direct marketing, where marketing materials are inserted into other communications, such as a catalog, newspaper, magazine, package, or bill. Coop or shared mail, where marketing offers from several companies are delivered via a single envelope, is also considered insert media.

=== Out-of-home ===
Out-of-home direct marketing refers to a wide array of media designed to reach the consumer outside the home, including billboards, transit, bus shelters, bus benches, aerials, airports, in-flight, in-store, movies, college campus/high schools, hotels, shopping malls, sport facilities, stadiums, taxis—that contain a call-to-action for the customer to respond.

=== Direct selling ===
Direct selling is the sale of products by face-to-face contact with the customer, either by having salespeople approach potential customers in person, or through indirect means such as Tupperware parties.

=== Grassroots/community marketing ===
Grassroots marketing involves advertising in the local community. The goal is to involve the community in discussions about the business through local events, meetings, and projects.

== Ethical conduct ==
The ICC Consolidated Code of Advertising and Marketing relates to all direct marketing activities in their entirety, whatever their form, medium or content. It sets the standards of ethical conduct to be followed by marketers, practitioners or other contractors providing services for direct marketing purposes or in the media.

=== The offer ===
The fulfillment of any obligation arising from a direct marketing activity should be prompt and efficient.

Whenever an offer is made, all the commitments to be fulfilled by the marketer, the operator and the consumer should be made clear to consumers, either directly or by reference to sales conditions available to them at the time of the offer.

=== Presentation ===
When the presentation of an offer also features products not included in the offer, or where additional products need to be purchased to enable the consumer to use the product on offer, this should be made clear in the original offer.

High-pressure tactics which might be construed as harassment should be avoided, and, marketers should ensure that they respect local culture and tradition to avoid offensive questions.

=== Right of withdrawal ===
Where consumers have a right of withdrawal (the consumer's right to resend any goods to the seller, or to cancel the order for services, within a certain time limit and thus annulling the sale), the marketer should inform them of the existence of this right, how to obtain further information about it, and how to exercise it. Where there is an offer to supply products to the consumer on the basis of "free examination", "free trial", "free approval" and the like, it should be made clear in the offer who will bear the cost of returning products and the procedure for returning them should be as simple as possible. Any time limit for the return should be clearly disclosed.

=== Identity of the marketer ===
The identity of the marketer and/or operator and details of where and how they may be contacted should be given in the offer, so as to enable the consumer to communicate directly and effectively with them. This information should be available as a permanent reference which the consumer can keep, i.e. via a separate document offline, an online document, email or SMS; it should not, for example, appear only on an order form which the consumer is required to return. At the time of delivery of the product, the marketer's full name, address and telephone number should be supplied to the consumer.

=== Respecting consumer wishes ===
Where consumers have indicated the wish not to receive direct marketing communications by signing on to a preference service, or in any other way, this should be respected. Marketers who are communicating with consumers internationally should, where possible, ensure that they avail themselves of the appropriate preference service in the markets to which they are addressing their communications and respect consumers' wishes not to receive such communications (see also General Provisions, article 19, data protection and privacy). Where a system exists, enabling consumers to indicate a wish not to receive unaddressed mail (e.g. mailbox stickers), this should be respected.

=== Responsibility ===
Overall responsibility for all aspects of direct marketing activities, whatever their kind or content, rests with the marketer. However, responsibility also applies to other participants in direct marketing activities and that needs to be taken into account. As well as marketers, these may include: operators, telemarketers or data controllers, or their subcontractors, who contribute to the activity or communication; publishers, media-owners or contractors who publish, transmit or distribute the offer or any other communication.

== See also ==
- Artificial intelligence marketing
- As seen on TV
- Customer relationship management
- Direct marketing associations
- Field marketing
- Influencer marketing
- Leaflet distribution
- Personalized marketing
- Street marketing
- TalkBack Reader Response System
- Transpromotional
