= Television comedy =

Television genre

Television comedy is a category of broadcasting that has been present since the early days of entertainment media. While there are several genres of comedy, some of the first ones aired were variety shows. One of the first United States television programs was the comedy-variety show Texaco Star Theater, which was most prominent in the years that it featured Milton Berle (from 1948 to 1956). The range of television comedy has become broader, with the addition of sitcoms, improvisational comedy, and stand-up comedy, while also adding comedic aspects into other television genres, including drama and news. Television comedy provides opportunities for viewers to relate the content in these shows to society. Some audience members may have similar views about certain comedic aspects of shows, while others will take different perspectives. This also relates to developing new social norms, sometimes acting as the medium that introduces these transitions.

== Genres ==
=== Sitcom ===
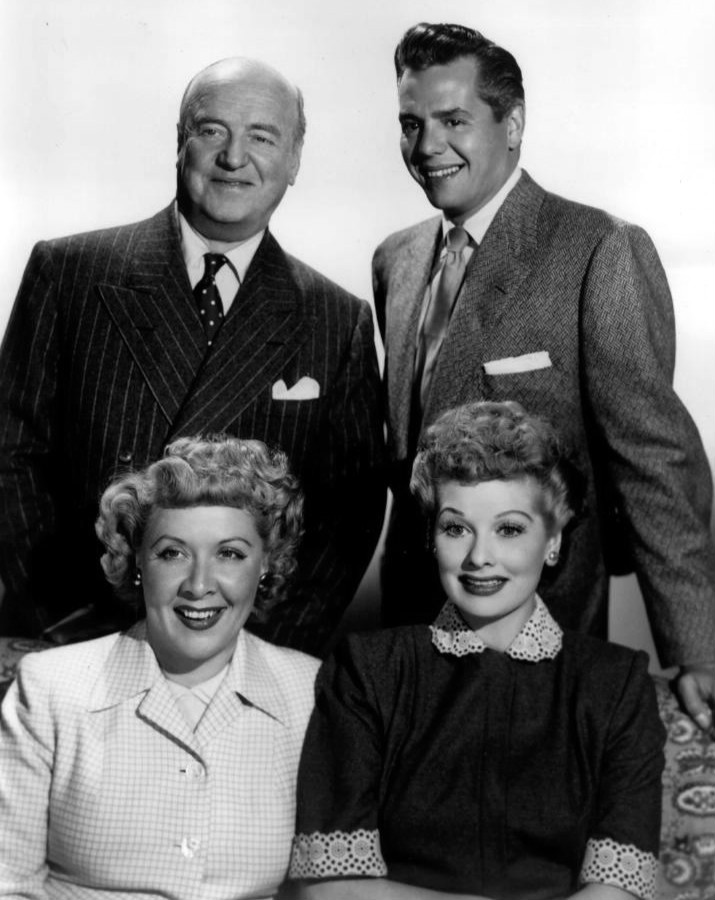
Cast of I Love Lucy, listed clockwise from top left: William Frawley (Fred Mertz), Desi Arnaz (Ricky Ricardo), Lucille Ball (Lucy Ricardo), and Vivian Vance (Ethel Mertz)

The situation comedy (or sitcom) has become one of the most commonly-watched types of television comedy. As the name suggests, these programs feature recurring characters placed in humorous situations. The first television sitcom was the U.K.'s Pinwright's Progress, ten episodes being broadcast bi-weekly from November 1946 to May 1947. Since the early 1950s, with shows including Hancock's Half Hour in the U.K. (derived from a radio show), and I Love Lucy in the United States, sitcoms have become more prominent among television viewers. I Love Lucy was popular in Nielsen's audience ratings, topping the viewing charts in four out of their six years on the air. Sitcoms will often portray comedic moments through audience laughter, either through live audiences or a laugh track. They are almost always a half-hour in length, and in some cases, they will film using a multiple-camera setup. Sitcoms are seldom presented as realistic depictions of life, but they can generate honest humour through the relationships between and development of characters.

=== Improvisational comedy ===
Improvisational comedy is a genre that features actors creating dialogue while in the process of acting. It has a history of prominence in the United States, the United Kingdom, and Australia. Before appearing on television, comedy programs were already present on the radio. Several of these programs, including The Day Today and The Mary Whitehouse Experience, eventually transferred over to television. Whose Line is it Anyway? was created in 1988 by The Comedy Store Players, Mike Myers' improvisation students in London. It began broadcasting in the UK before expanding to the US, with Drew Carey starring in the American version until its cancellation.

Some sitcoms may also use improvisation when filming. The actors of Curb Your Enthusiasm had general episode summaries to rely on, but would often create their own lines when they were in front of the camera.

=== News comedy ===
News comedy is a genre that brings humour into stories reported on mainstream news, commonly adding this by creating mostly-fictional jokes to summarize true events. It is a common way for young adults to learn about the political news and events of their time. Programs that have accomplished this include The Daily Show and "Weekend Update" on Saturday Night Live. The Daily Show became more well-known when Jon Stewart began hosting in 1999. The award-winning show mocks political events and candidates, and brings in correspondents to report further on these events and people. During the 2000 U.S. presidential election, 435,000 young adults viewed Stewart's coverage, while 459,000 watched traditional news. Despite its satirical approach, journalists have stated that programs such as The Daily Show and "Weekend Update" still broadcast real news, which ensures that its producers are aware of how to cover this news in a way that viewers can gain knowledge.

=== Stand-up ===
Stand-up comedy has been represented on television. Stand-up comedians have been a staple of variety and late-night talk shows; talk-variety shows such as The Tonight Show traditionally open with a comedy monologue performed by the program host. Television stand-up reached a peak of popularity on British schedules with the ITV programme The Comedians. Their style of comedy was swept away almost entirely in the Britain of the early 1980s when a new generation of stand-ups challenged what they saw as racist and sexist humour and revolutionised the form under the banner alternative comedy. In the US, stand-up comedy programs became popular on many cable television channels beginning in the mid-1980s, as such "brick wall" shows (nicknamed for the stereotypical use of a fake brick wall as a backdrop) were cheap to produce and air. Stand-up humour later had mixed fortunes on the small screen, often shunted away to the small hours or as part of a larger entertainment extravaganza.

=== Game show ===
Some game shows may give the guests a chance to perform stand-up comedy to win a round. Examples of this genre in the UK include Have I Got News for You, 8 Out of 10 Cats, Mock the Week, and Never Mind the Buzzcocks. In the United States, this is a less common genre, Oblivious being one of the few examples. In Japan and South Korea, these comedy gameshows, often with subtitles and word bubbles, are extremely popular.

=== Comedy drama ===
A comedy-drama is a program that combines humor with more serious dramatic elements, aiming for a considerably more realistic tone than conventional sitcoms. These programs are shot with a single-camera setup and presented without a laugh track and typically run an hour in length. This can refer to a genre of television or radio drama series. There are different subgenres within this category, such as the medical comedy dramas like M*A*S*H and Doogie Howser, M.D., legal comedy dramas like Ally McBeal and Boston Legal, and the musical comedy drama Glee.

=== Sketch comedy ===
Sketch comedy programs differ from sitcoms in that they do not basically feature recurring characters (though some characters and scenarios may be repeated) and often draw upon current events and emphasize satire over character development. Sketch comedy was pioneered by Sid Caesar, whose Your Show of Shows debuted in 1950 and established many conventions of the genre. American sketch comedy reached a later peak in the mid-1970s with the debut han Saturday Night Live, originally a variety program but soon devoted mostly to sketches. In the UK, two of the more successful examples are Monty Python's Flying Circus and Little Britain.

=== Animated cartoon ===
Animated cartoons have long been a source of comedy on television. Early children's programming often recycled theatrical cartoons; later, low-budget animation produced especially for television dominated Saturday-morning network programming in the US.

== Impact on society ==
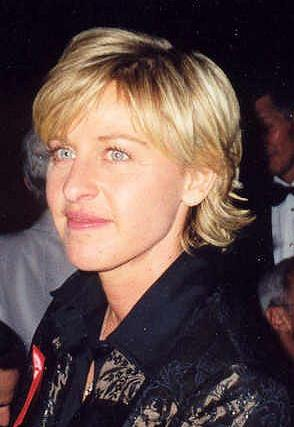
Ellen DeGeneres, pictured here in 1997. She made a large impact on television when she came out as lesbian on her sitcom, Ellen (1994–1998).

=== Audience interpretations ===
Television comedy is described by media scholar Bore as a way to bring audiences to a collective sense in viewing and enjoying commonly-watched programs across societies. One specific way this can be done is through laugh tracks. While some view laugh tracks as ways to allow audiences to lightheartedly poke fun at characters, others see them as ways to restrict viewers to only laugh at certain moments. For the latter, it can also be seen as collectively taking over the real laughter of viewers watching from home.

Another aspect of audience's interpretations of comedy on television refer to how far writers go when poking fun at characters or real-life people. Saturday Night Live found itself in controversy when a sketch was performed, imitating politician David Paterson for both his political abilities and his blindness. This brought up the idea of two central forms of humour that comedies will use: one prioritizes the joke itself and how it generates laughter from an audience, while the other prioritizes the personal characteristics of whom an actor is impersonating.

=== Changing norms throughout comedy's history ===
Comedy has been a television genre prominent for introducing concepts that typically do not align with series' respective social norms. One of these concepts is same-sex intimacy. The appearance of these scenes were not popular in the early days of comedy, and in shows such as Roseanne and Ellen, ratings could be changed up to TV-14 and receive a "mature content" warning as a result. Ellen DeGeneres famously came out on her show, although ABC cancelled Ellen one year later, with some gay rights groups protesting this decision.

I Love Lucy became the first sitcom to have a multilingual couple. Lucy was American and spoke English, while Ricky was Cuban and spoke Spanish. The relationship between spouses in sitcoms has also changed throughout history. In earlier shows, the women would be the ones who made comedic errors, while the men, having more dominance, would become upset at their wives. Some more recent shows, such as The King of Queens, would have the opposite roles, with the male characters making more mistakes, while their more sophisticated wives would become upset at their husbands for their actions.

== See also ==
- Britcom – list of British sitcoms
- Comedy film
- German television comedy
- Lists of comedies
