= Subscription business model =

Recurring price business model

The subscription business model is a business model in which a customer must pay a recurring price at regular intervals for access to a product or service. The model was pioneered by publishers of books and periodicals in the 17th century. It is particularly common now for digital products, which lend themselves more naturally toward a subscription model.

Subscriptions can be a more convenient, hassle-free transaction for consumers. However, due to inertia among some consumers, they may inadvertently pay for subscriptions that they no longer value because they do not realize that they are subscribed.

== Subscriptions ==
Rather than selling products individually, a subscription offers periodic use or access to a product or service, or, in the case of performance-oriented organizations such as opera companies, tickets to the entire run of some set number of (e.g., five to fifteen) scheduled performances for a whole season. Thus, a one-time sale of a product can become a recurring sale and build brand loyalty.

Industries that use this model include mail order, book sales clubs and music sales clubs, private web mail providers, cable television, satellite television providers with pay television channels, providers with digital catalogs with downloadable music or eBooks, audiobooks, satellite radio, telephone companies, mobile network operators, internet providers, software publishers, websites (e.g., blogging websites), business solutions providers, financial firms, health clubs, lawn mowing and snowplowing services, pharmaceuticals, renting an apartment, property taxes, as well as the traditional newspapers, magazines, and academic journals.

Renewal of a subscription may be periodic and activated automatically so that the cost of a new period is automatically paid for by a pre-authorized charge to a credit card or a checking account. A common variation of the model in online games and on websites is the freemium model, in which the first tier of content is free. Still, access to premium features (for example, game power-ups or article archives) is limited to paying subscribers.

In addition to the freemium model, other subscription pricing variations are gaining traction. For instance, the tiered pricing model is frequently used in software as a service (SaaS) platforms, offering customers different access levels and features based on their subscription tier. This model is particularly effective for tailoring services to customer requirements. Another approach is the usage-based pricing model, which calculates charges based on the extent of service or product utilization by the customer. This model is becoming increasingly prevalent, especially in services where customer usage varies significantly.

A subscription service may offer a free trial, allowing customers temporary access to the service in order to increase the likelihood that the customer will convert and commit to a paid subscription. Sometimes, publishers will send out free copies of a publication through mail without the recipient requesting one in the form of a forced free trial.

=== Types and examples ===
There are different categories of subscriptions:

- A subscription for a fixed set of goods or services.
  - Periodicals, such as a newspaper or magazine, have several types of subscriptions:
    - Paid circulation
    - Non-paid circulation
    - Controlled circulation
  - Subscription boxes contain a variety of consumables
    - Community-supported agriculture
    - Meal delivery service
    - Meal kit delivery service
- A subscription for unlimited use of a service or collection of services. Usage may be personal and non-transferable for a family or, under certain circumstances, for a group utilizing a service simultaneously. In the publishing industry, a subscription to a bundle of several journals, at a discounted price, is known as a "big deal".
  - Software as a service
- A pay-as-you-go subscription where a consumer subscribes to purchase a product periodically. This is also known as the convenience model because it is convenient for the customer not to have to remember to find their product and buy it periodically. This model has been popularized by companies like Dollar Shave Club, Birchbox, and OrderGroove. Based on their success, many other retailers have begun to offer subscription model services.
  - For example, a company's subscription to a rail pass may not be individualized but might permit all firm employees to use the service. Subscriptions of this type are rare for goods with an unlimited supply and many luxury services.
- A subscription for basic access or minimal service plus some additional charge depending on usage. A basic telephone service pays a pre-determined fee for monthly use. Still, it may have extra charges for other services such as long-distance calls, directory, and pay-per-call services. When the basic service is offered free of charge, this business model is often referred to as Freemium.
- An online subscription supports content creators using crowdfunding. Fans can interact and send tips to the content creator but also have access to exclusive paid content. Popular examples are Patreon and OnlyFans.

=== Publishing ===
In publishing, the subscription model typically involves a paywall, paysite, or other "toll-access" system (named in opposition to open access). As revenues from digital advertising diminish, a paid subscription model is being favoured by more publishers who see it as a comparatively stable income stream.

== Academic journals ==
In the field of academic publishing, the subscription business model means that articles of a specific journal or conference proceedings are only available to subscribers. Subscriptions are typically sold to universities and other higher education institutions and research institutes, though some academic publishers also sell individual subscriptions or access to individual articles.

In contrast with other media such as newspapers, subscription fees to academic publishers generally do not go towards supporting the creation of the content: the scientific articles are written by scientists and reviewed by other scientists as part of their work duties. The publisher does not pay the paper authors and reviewers. In this light, the subscription model has been called undesirable by proponents of the open access movement.

Academic publications that use the subscription model are called "closed-access" in opposition to their open-access counterparts.

== Effects ==
=== Vendors ===
Businesses benefit because they are assured a predictable and constant revenue stream from subscribed individuals for the duration of the subscriber's agreement. Not only does this greatly reduce uncertainty and the riskiness of the enterprise, but it often provides payment in advance (as with magazines, and concert tickets), while allowing customers to become greatly attached to using the service and, therefore, more likely to extend by signing an agreement for the next period close to when the current agreement expires.

In an integrated software solution, for example, the subscription pricing structure is designed so that the revenue stream from the recurring subscriptions is considerably more significant than the revenue from simple one-time purchases. Some subscription schemes (like magazines) also increase sales by not allowing subscribers to accept or reject any specific issue. This reduces customer acquisition costs and allows personalized marketing or database marketing. However, the system requires that the business have an accurate, reliable, and timely way to manage and track subscriptions.

From a marketing-analyst perspective, the vendor has the added benefit of knowing the number of currently active members since a subscription typically involves a contractual agreement. This so-called 'contractual' setting facilitates customer relationship management to a large extent because the analyst knows who is an active customer and who recently churned.

Additional benefits include a higher average customer lifetime value (ACLV) than that of nonrecurring business models, greater customer inertia and a more committed customer base as it transitions from purchase to opt-out decisions, and more potential for upselling and cross-selling other products or services.

Some software companies such as Adobe and Autodesk have moved from a perpetual licensing model to a subscription model, known as "software as a service". This move has significant implications for sales and customer support organizations. Over time, the need to close large deals decreases, resulting in lower sales costs. However, the size of the customer support organization increases so that the paying customers stay happy.

=== Customers ===
Consumers may find subscriptions convenient if they believe they will buy a product regularly and might save money. The customer saves time for repeated delivery of the product or service.

Subscriptions which exist to support clubs and organizations call their subscribers "members" and they are given access to a group with similar interests.

Subscription pricing can make it easier to pay for expensive items since they can often be paid for over time and thus can make the product seem more affordable. On the other hand, most newspaper and magazine-type subscriptions are paid upfront, which may prevent some customers from subscribing. Fixed prices may be an advantage for consumers who frequently use those services. However, it could disadvantage a customer who plans to use the service frequently but later does not. The commitment to paying for a package may have been more expensive than a single purchase. In addition, subscription models increase the possibility of vendor lock-in, which can have fatally business-critical implications for a customer if its business depends on the availability of software: For example, without an online connection to a licensing server to verify the licensing status every once in a while, a software under a subscription-model would typically stop functioning or fall back to the functionality of a freemium version, thereby making it impossible (to continue) to use the software in remote places or particularly secure environments without internet access, after the vendor has stopped supporting the version or software, or even has gone out of business leaving the customer without a chance to renew the subscription and access his data or designs maintained with the software (in some businesses it is important to have full access even to old files for decades). Also, consumers may find repeated payments to be onerous.

Subscription models often require or allow the business to gather substantial amounts of information from the customer (such as magazine mailing lists), and this raises issues of privacy.

A subscription model may benefit the software buyer if it forces the supplier to improve its product. Accordingly, a psychological phenomenon may occur when a customer renews a subscription, that may not occur during a one-time transaction: if the buyer is not satisfied with the service, he/she can leave the subscription to expire and find another seller.

=== Environment ===
Because customers may only need or want some of the items received, this can lead to waste and an adverse effect on the environment, depending on the products. Greater volumes of production, greater energy and natural resource consumption, and subsequently greater disposal costs are incurred.

Subscription models also create the opposite effect. This can be illustrated by subscribing to a service for mowing lawns. The effective use of a single mower increases when mowing for a collection of homes; instead of every family owning a lawnmower that is not used as much as the service-providing mower, the use of resources for producing lawnmowers, therefore, decreases while lawns stay cut.

== See also ==
- Easy-to-cancel mandate
- Payment system
- Index of accounting articles
- Outline of economics
- List of financial accounting topics
- Outline of marketing
- Rent-seeking
- Pay to play
- Social media, subscribing to a social media account/profile is usually free
