= List of comedy anime =

This is a list of comedy anime television series, films, OVAs and ONAs. While not all inclusive, this list contains numerous works that are representative of the genre.

Title	Type	Year(s)	Director	Studio	Ref
Norakuro	TV series	1970	Toru Murayama	TCJ	
Urusei Yatsura (1981)	TV series	1981	Mamoru Oshii, Kazuo Yamazaki	Studio Pierrot, Studio Deen	
Tonde Mon Pe	TV series	1982	Shigetsugu Yoshida	TMS Entertainment	
Norakuro-kun	TV series	1987	Masami Anno	Studio Pierrot	
Ranma ½	TV series	1989	Tomomi Mochizuki, Tsutomu Shibayama	Studio Deen	
Ranma ½ Nettōhen	TV series	1989	Koji Sawai, Junji Nishimura	Studio Deen	
Gosenzo-sama Banbanzai!	OVA series	1989	Mamoru Oshii	Pierrot	
Maroko	Film	1990	Mamoru Oshii	Pierrot	
Tsuyoshi Shikkari Shinasai	TV series	1992	Shin Misawa	Studio Comet	
Kyō Kara Ore Wa!!	OVA series	1993	Hiroyuki Nishimori	Pierrot	
Oh My Goddess!	OVA	1993	Hiroaki Gōda	AIC	
Sorcerous Stabber Orphen: Beginning	TV series	1998	Hiroshi Watanabe	J.C. Staff	
Oh My Goddess! Adventures of Mini-Goddess	TV series	1998	Hiroko Kazui, Yasuhiro Matsumura	OLM	
Sorcerous Stabber Orphen: Revenge	TV series	1999	Toru Takahashi	J.C. Staff	
Ah! My Goddess:The Movie	movie	2000	Hiroaki Gōda	AIC	
Ghost Stories	TV series	2000	Noriyuki Abe	Pierrot	
Fruits Basket	TV series	2001	Akitaro Daichi	Studio Deen	
Azumanga Daioh: The Animation	TV series	2002	Hiroshi Nishikiori	J.C.Staff	
Cromartie High School	TV series	2003	Hiroaki Sakurai	Production I.G.	
Bobobo-bo Bo-bobo	TV series	2003	Hiroki Shibata	Toei Animation	
Ah! My Goddess	TV series and OVA's	2005	Hiroaki Gōda	AIC	
Bludgeoning Angel Dokuro-Chan	OVA series	2005	Tsutomu Mizushima	Hal Film Maker	
Ah! My Goddess: Flights of Fancy	TV series	2006	Hiroaki Gōda	AIC	
The Melancholy of Haruhi Suzumiya	TV series	2006	Tatsuya Ishihara, Yutaka Yamamoto	Kyoto Animation	
Ouran High School Host Club	TV series	2006	Takuya Igarashi	Bones	
Ah! My Goddess: Fighting Wings	OVA series	2007	Hiroaki Gōda	AIC	
Sketchbook ~full color's~	TV series	2007	Yoshimasa Hiraike	Hal Film Maker	
Minami-ke	TV series	2007	Masahiko Ohta	Daume	
Minami-ke: Okawari	TV series	2008	Naoto Hosoda	Asread	
Special A	TV series	2008	Miyao, Yoshikazu	Gonzo, AIC	
Gintama	TV series	2009	Shinji Takamatsu, Yoichi Fujita	Sunrise	
Hetalia: Axis Powers	OVA series	2009	Bob Shirohata	Studio Deen	
Minami-ke: Betsubara	OVA	2009	Kei Oikawa	Asread	
Minami-ke: Okaeri	TV series	2009	Kei Oikawa	Asread	
Baka and Test	TV series	2010	Shin Onuma	Silver Link	
Mitsudomoe	TV series	2010	Masahiko Ohta	Bridge	
Sket Dance	TV series	2011	Keiichiro Kawaguchi	Tatsunoko Production	
Ah! My Goddess: Together Forever	OVA series	2011	Hiroaki Gōda	AIC	
Minami-ke: Omatase	OVA	2012	Keiichiro Kawaguchi	Feel	
Acchi Kocchi	TV series	2012	Fumitoshi Oizaki	AIC	
Hori-san to Miyamura-kun	OVA series	2012	Shingo Natsume, Erkin Kawabata, Tetsuo Hirakawa, Kazuya Aiura	Hoods Entertainment, Marone, Gonzo, Studio Kai	
Kotoura-san	TV series	2013	Masahiko Ohta	AIC Classic	
Minami-ke: Tadaima	TV series	2013	Keiichiro Kawaguchi	Feel	
Minami-ke: Natsuyasumi	OVA	2013	Keiichiro Kawaguchi	Feel	
My Youth Romantic Comedy Is Wrong, as I Expected	OVA and TV series	2013	Kei Oikawa, Takashi Ikehata	Feel	
D-Frag!	TV series	2014	Seiki Sugawara	Brain's Base	
Engaged to the Unidentified	TV series	2014	Yoshiyuki Fujiwara	Dogakobo	
Hōzuki no Reitetsu	TV series	2014	Hiro Kaburaki	Wit Studio	
Inari, Konkon, Koi Iroha	TV series	2014	Toru Takahashi	Production IMS	
Love, Chunibyo and Other Delusions! -Heart Throb-	TV series	2014	Tatsuya Ishihara	Kyoto Animation	
Minna Atsumare! Falcom beep Gakuen	TV series	2014	Pippuya	chara-ani, Dax Production	
Tonari no Seki-kun: The Master of Killing Time	TV series	2014	Yūji Mutoh	Shin-Ei Animation	
Nisekoi	TV series	2014	Naoyuki Tatsuwa, Akiyuki Shinbo	Shaft	
No Game, No Life	TV series	2014	Atsuko Ishizuka	Madhouse	
No-Rin	TV series	2014	Shin Ōnuma	Silver Link	
Oneechan ga Kita	TV series	2014	Yoshihide Yuuzumi	C2C	
Go! Go! 575	TV series	2014	Takefumi Anzai	Lay-duce, C2C	
Pupipō!	TV series	2014	Kaoru Suzuki	AIC Plus+	
Recently, My Sister Is Unusual	TV series	2014	Hiroyuki Hata	Project No.9	
Robot Girls Z	TV series	2014	Hiroshi Ikehata	Toei Animation	
Seitokai Yakuindomo*	TV series	2014	Hiromitsu Kanazawa	GoHands	
Silver Spoon season 2	TV series	2014	Tomohiko Itō, Kotomi Deai	A-1 Pictures	
Space Dandy	TV series	2014	Shinichirō Watanabe; Shingo Natsume	Bones	
Strange+	TV series	2014	Takashi Nishikawa	Seven	
SoniAni: Super Sonico The Animation	TV series	2014	Kenichi Kawamura	White Fox	
Wake Up, Girls!	TV series	2014	Yutaka Yamamoto	Ordet, Tatsunoko Production	
Witch Craft Works	TV series	2014	Tsutomu Mizushima	J.C.Staff	
Wooser's Hand-to-Mouth Life: Awakening Arc	TV series	2014	Toyonori Yamada	Sanzigen	
World Conquest Zvezda Plot	TV series	2014	Tensai Okamura	A-1 Pictures	
Yo-Kai Watch	TV series	2014	Shinji Ushiro	OLM	
Food Wars: Shokugeki no Soma	TV series	2015	Yoshitomo Yonetani	J.C.Staff	
Shimoneta: A Boring World Where the Concept of Dirty Jokes Doesn't Exist	TV series	2015	Yohei Suzuki	J.C Staff	
Mr. Osomatsu	TV series	2015	Yoichi Fujita	Pierrot (company)	
Konosuba	TV series and OVA's	2016	Takaomi Kanasaki	Studio Deen	
Pingu in the City	TV series	2017	Naomi Iwata	Polygon Pictures	
Zombie Land Saga	TV series	2018	Munehisa Sakai	MAPPA	
Pop Team Epic	TV series	2018	Jun Aoki, Aoi Umeki	Kamikaze Douga, Space Neko Company	
Teasing Master Takagi-san	TV series	2018	Hiroaki Akagi	Shin-Ei Animation	
Hinamatsuri	TV series	2018	Kei Oikawa	feel.	
KonoSuba: God's Blessing on This Wonderful World! Legend of Crimson	movie	2019	Takaomi Kanasaki	J.C.Staff	
Fruits Basket	TV series	2019	Yoshihide Ibata	TMS/8PAN	
Kaguya-sama: Love Is War	TV series	2019	Shinichi Omata	A-1 Pictures	
The Quintessential Quintuplets, The Quintessential Quintuplets II	TV series	2019	Satoshi Kuwabara, Kaori	Tezuka Productions, Bibury Animation Studios	
Sorcerous Stabber Orphen: Wayward Journey	TV series	2020	Takayuki Hamana	Studio Deen	
Horimiya	TV series	2021	Masashi Ishihama	CloverWorks	
Life Lessons with Uramichi Oniisan	TV series	2021	Nobuyoshi Nagayama	Studio Blanc	
The Dungeon of Black Company	TV series	2021	Mirai Minato	Silver Link	
Zombie Land Saga Revenge	TV series	2021	Munehisa Sakai	MAPPA	
My Senpai Is Annoying	TV series	2021	Ryota Itoh	Doga Kobo	
Komi Can't Communicate	TV series	2021	Ayumu Watanabe, Kazuki Kawagoe	OLM	
Teasing Master Takagi-san: The Movie	movie	2022	Hiroaki Akagi	Shin-Ei Animation	
The Quintessential Quintuplets Movie	movie	2022	Masato Jinbo	Bibury Animation Studios	
Kaguya-sama: Love Is War – The First Kiss That Never Ends	movie	2022	Shinichi Omata	A-1 Pictures	
Kotaro Lives Alone	ONA series	2022	Tomoe Makino	Liden Films	
Fruits Basket: Prelude	movie	2022	Yoshihitde Ibata	TMS Entertainment	
Spy × Family	TV series	2022	Kazuhiro Fukuhashi	Wit Studio, CloverWorks	
Bocchi the Rock!	TV series	2022	Keiichirō Saitō	CloverWorks	
Chainsaw Man	TV series	2022	Ryū Nakayama	MAPPA	
Urusei Yatsura (2022)	TV series	2022	Hideya Takahashi, Yasuhiro Kimura, Takahiro Kamei	David Production	
KonoSuba:An Explosion on This Wonderful World!	TV series	2023	Takaomi Kanasaki, Yujiro Abe	Drive	
My Deer Friend Nokotan	TV series	2024	Masahiko Ohta	Wit Studio	
