= Forced free trial =

Direct marketing technique

A forced free trial is a direct-marketing technique, usually for goods sold by regular subscription, in which potential buyers are sent a number of free product sample, usually periodic publications. Often, publishers distribute free copies and the reader is not asked to subscribe. The reader's address appears on a piece of paper that goes out with the publication – a label carrier that could easily contain a promotional message. From the company's perspective, the copies are being sent out anyway, so the postage cost is already paid and the additional cost of promotion is negligible. When the reader subscribes, the sender already has their name and address pre-printed on the form. Add in some cross-selling opportunities (e.g. conference, directory or newsletter) and the company can make a lot of money from a subscriber, whose information cost very little to acquire.

It is said that announcing a three-issue free trial and sending out a fourth issue works well to ensure good subscription rates. There are several places in which free trials can be found. Free trials are used by many different companies offering products and services. It is a marketing and advertising move in which the company or maker of said product or service is so confident in their offering that they give it to a potential customer in a trial test format. Once the recipient decides that they like the product or service, the company knows they will have that customer's business.

However, a free trial in exchange for credit card details can not be stated as a free trial, as there is a component of expenditure.

== See also ==
- Freemium
- "Free" trial
