= List of Brazilian comedy films =

This is a list of Brazilian comedy films.

== Feature length films ==
=== 1950s ===
1959

- Black Orpheus
- O Homem do Sputnik

=== 1970s ===
1970

- A Arte de Amar Bem
- The Alienist
- Ascensão e Queda de um Paquera
- Betão Ronca Ferro

1971

- Pra Quem Fica, Tchau

1978

- Mônica e Cebolinha: No Mundo de Romeu e Julieta

1979

- A Banda das Velhas Virgens

=== 1985 ===
- The Adventures of Sergio Mallandro

=== 1986 ===
- Os Trapalhões e o Rei do Futebol

=== 2000 ===
- O Auto da Compadecida
- Bossa Nova
- Castelo Rá-Tim-Bum

=== 2001 ===
- Caramuru: A Invenção do Brasil

=== 2002 ===
- Que sera, sera

=== 2003 ===
- The Man Who Copied

=== 2003 ===
- Meu Tio Matou um Cara

=== 2005 ===
- O Casamento de Romeu e Julieta

=== 2006 ===
- O Cheiro do Ralo
- Se Eu Fosse Você

=== 2007 ===
- Chega de Saudade
- Ó Paí, Ó
- Saneamento Básico

=== 2008 ===
- Apenas o Fim
- Casa da Mãe Joana

=== 2010 ===
- Bollywood Dream
- De Pernas pro Ar
- Reflexões de um Liquidificador

=== 2011 ===
- Brasil Animado
- Cilada.com
- The Clown
- Teste de Elenco

=== 2012 ===
- As Aventuras de Agamenon, o Repórter
- Até que a Sorte nos Separe
- Buddies
- De Pernas pro Ar 2
- Eu Não Faço a Menor Ideia do que eu Tô Fazendo Com a Minha Vida
- Insônia

=== 2013 ===
- Até que a Sorte nos Separe 2
- Casa da Mãe Joana 2
- Cine Holliúdy
- O Concurso
- Confissões de Adolescente
- The Dognapper
- Meu Passado Me Condena
- Minha Mãe é uma Peça
- Odeio o Dia dos Namorados
- Se Puder... Dirija!
- Vai que Dá Certo

=== 2014 ===
- Copa de Elite
- Julio Sumiu
- Muita Calma Nessa Hora 2
- Os Homens São de Marte... E é pra Lá que Eu Vou!
- S.O.S Mulheres ao Mar!

== See also ==
- Lists of comedy films
