= List of comedy films =

This is an index of lists of comedy films split by decade, nationality and subject.

== By decade ==
- List of comedy films before 1920
- List of comedy films of the 1920s
- List of comedy films of the 1930s
- List of comedy films of the 1940s
- List of comedy films of the 1950s
- List of comedy films of the 1960s
- List of comedy films of the 1970s
- List of comedy films of the 1980s
- List of comedy films of the 1990s
- List of comedy films of the 2000s
- List of comedy films of the 2010s
- List of comedy films of the 2020s

== By nationality ==
- List of American comedy films
- List of Brazilian comedy films
- List of British comedy films
- List of Indian comedy films

== By subject ==
- List of comedy horror films
- List of comedy–mystery films
- List of romantic comedy films
- List of science fiction comedy films

== See also ==
- AFI's 100 Years...100 Laughs
- Lists of comedies
- List of comedy television series
  - List of BBC sitcoms
  - List of comedy drama television series
  - List of radio comedies
  - List of theatrical comedies
- List of highest-grossing comedy films
