= Comedians' Comedians =

BBC radio programme

- Genre: Comedy radio
- Running time: 30 minutes
- Country of origin: United Kingdom
- Language: English
- Home station: BBC Radio 2
- Starring: Angus Deayton
- Original release: November 2000 – February 2003
- No. of episodes: 16

Comedians' Comedians is a radio programme that aired from November 2000 to February 2003. There were sixteen half-hour episodes and it was broadcast on BBC Radio 2. It starred Angus Deayton.
