= Clive Anderson's Comedy Revolutions =

2004–2005 British radio programme

- Genre: Comedy radio
- Running time: 30 minutes
- Country of origin: United Kingdom
- Language: English
- Home station: BBC Radio 2
- Starring: Clive Anderson
- Original release: June 2004 – December 2005
- No. of episodes: 12

Clive Anderson's Comedy Revolutions is a radio programme that originally aired from June 2004 to December 2005. There were twelve half-hour episodes and it was broadcast on BBC Radio 2. It starred Clive Anderson.
