= Comedy Showcase (radio show) =

BBC radio programme

- Genre: Comedy radio
- Running time: 30 minutes
- Country of origin: United Kingdom
- Language: English
- Home station: BBC Radio 2
- Original release: March 1998 – February 2000
- No. of episodes: 19

Comedy Showcase is a radio programme which aired on BBC Radio 2 between March 1998 and February 2000. There were nineteen episodes, each of which lasted half an hour.
