= List of theatrical comedies =

This is a list of theatrical comedies.

== France ==
- Les affaires sont les affaires (trans. Business is business), by Octave Mirbeau (1903).
- La Puce a l'Oreille (trans. "A Flea in Her Ear"), by Georges Feydeau

== India ==
- Kithaab. by Rafeeq Mangalassery.

== Russia ==
- The Government Inspector by Nikolai Gogol (made into the Danny Kaye screen musical The Inspector General.)

== United Kingdom ==
- The Importance of Being Earnest by Oscar Wilde (adapted for film and television numerous times)
- Much Ado About Nothing and half a dozen others by William Shakespeare
- The Rocky Horror Show by Richard O'Brien
- Comic operas by Gilbert and Sullivan including H.M.S. Pinafore, The Pirates of Penzance, Patience, Iolanthe, The Mikado and many others.

== United States ==
- A Funny Thing Happened on the Way to the Forum
- Grease
- Into the Woods
- You're a Good Man, Charlie Brown
- Personal Appearance
- London Calling
- The Odd Couple
- Spamalot
- Many American stage musicals have a strong comedic element.

== See also ==
- Lists of comedy films
- List of comedy television series
- List of radio comedies
