= The Quintessential Quintuplets season 1 =

2019 anime television series

The Quintessential Quintuplets
- Season 1
- Anime key visual
- No. of episodes: 12

Release
- Original network: TBS
- Original release: January 10 – March 28, 2019

Season chronology
- Next → Season 2

The Quintessential Quintuplets (Japanese: 五等分の花嫁, Hepburn: Go-Tōbun no Hanayome; lit. "Quintuplet Brides"), also known as 5-Tōbun no Hanayome, is the first season for the anime television series based on shōnen manga series written and illustrated by Negi Haruba.

The anime series is licensed in North America under Crunchyroll-Funimation partnership. The anime television series adaptation was announced in the combined 36th and 37th issue of Weekly Shōnen Magazine on August 8, 2018. The series is directed by Satoshi Kuwabara and written by Keiichirō Ōchi, featuring animation by Tezuka Productions, character designs by Michinosuke Nakamura and Gagakuga, and music by Natsumi Tabuchi, Hanae Nakamura, and Miki Sakurai. The series aired from January 10 to March 28, 2019, on the TBS, SUN, and BS-TBS channels. The series ran for 12 episodes. Crunchyroll is streaming the series with Funimation providing the English dub.

Kana Hanazawa, Ayana Taketatsu, Miku Itō, Ayane Sakura, and Inori Minase performed the opening theme song "Quintuplet Feelings" (五等分の気持ち, Gotōbun no Kimochi) as the group The Nakano family's quintuplets (中野家の五つ子, Nakano-ke no Itsutsugo), while Aya Uchida performed the ending theme song "Sign".

== Episode list ==
Story	Episode	Title (Note: All English titles are taken from Crunchyroll.)	Directed by	Written by	Storyboarded by	Original release date	Ref.
1	1	"The Quintessential Quintuplets"; Transliteration: "Go-tōbun no Hanayome" (Japanese: 五等分の花嫁)	Yasuo Iwamoto	Keiichirō Ōchi	Satoshi Kuwabara	January 10, 2019	
The episode opens with Futaro Uesugi on his wedding day, waking from a dream about the day that he met his bride (whose identity is obscured). The narrative flashes back to his school days in the cafeteria. He meets Itsuki Nakano when she sits at his usually solitary lunch table. Seeing his perfect score on a recent test paper, she asks him to help her study by offering to share her lunch. However, he becomes rude to her and she becomes upset with him. Futaro receives a call from his little sister Raiha, telling him that their father has secured him a part-time job as a tutor for a student he soon realizes is Itsuki. He tries to seek her out to apologize for earlier, but ends up meeting her four quintuplet sisters: Ichika, Yotsuba, Miku, and Nino (without realizing their biological identity). He goes to the Nakano apartment and tells Itsuki he is her tutor before finding out (to his shock) that the five are identical quintuplets, all of whom he has been hired to tutor. He attempts to hold their first study session, but only Yotsuba is responsive. Nino puts sleeping pills into Futaro's water and sends him home in a taxi. Itsuki accompanies him and meets Raiha as she greets her brother's arrival. She ends up eating dinner with the Uesugi family, discovering their financial struggles and accepting Raiha's invitation to return.
2	2	"Rooftop Confession"; Transliteration: "Okujō no kokuhaku" (Japanese: 屋上の告白)	Fumio Maezono	Keiichirō Ōchi	Satoshi Kuwabara	January 17, 2019	
At their next tutoring session, Futaro (in response to how hostile the quintuplets are to the idea of having him as a tutor) challenges them to take a test, assuring them that if they pass, he will not speak to them again. They all fail, achieving only 100 between the five of them. The next day, he asks them a history question that none of them can answer before noticing that Miku correctly answered the question on her test. He tries to ask her about it, but they are interrupted by Yotsuba and Ichika, who embarrass Miku by talking about crushes and conclude that she is in love. Futaro finds a note from Miku inviting him to the roof. When he arrives, he briefly misinterprets her admission about the earlier question as being a love confession. He discovers her interest in history (specifically Japanese warlords), and she tries to catch him out with an obscure reference, even going as far as to "disguise" herself as Yotsuba when running from him. Futaro presents her with her favorite soda as a peace offering, and upon revealing to Miku that her test score was the highest out of the 5, he also realizes each of them got different questions correctly. He uses this as encouragement, refusing to give up on a despondent Miku. She joins Futaro and Yotsuba for a study session at the library.
3	3	"A Mountain of Problems"; Transliteration: "Mondai wa yamadzumi" (Japanese: 問題は山積み)	Yorifusa Yamaguchi	Keiichirō Ōchi	Satoshi Kuwabara	January 24, 2019	
Futaro arrives for the quintuplets' next tutoring session, but as they are studying, Nino sends away Yotsuba, Ichika, and Itsuki, much to the annoyance of both Futaro and Miku. Nino challenges Miku to a cooking competition on the condition that they will stop studying if Nino wins. Nino's dish turns out much better looking than Miku's, but Futaro still judges the contest to be a draw, endearing him further to Miku. Before leaving, Futaro realizes that he had left his flashcards, He asks Miku to let him back in the apartment. However, he encounters a towel-clad Nino, who mistakes him for Miku without her contact lenses. She vents her anger at Futaro disrupting their sisterly unity, and unsettles a pile of books on a high shelf. Futaro saves her from the falling books, but is then caught in a compromising position by Itsuki, who takes a picture of them. The other sisters return home and convene a court-like meeting to decide if Futaro should continue as their tutor after the incident. Miku helps Futaro protest his innocence, and after examining Itsuki's photograph further, so do Ichika and Itsuki. Nino remains unimpressed, but leaves, upset at a comment from Ichika. She locks herself out but, too stubborn to ask the others to be let back in, ends up talking to Futaro, denying his accurate observations about her defensiveness of her sisters. She declares that she will decline his offer, regardless of her sisters' protestations.
4	4	"Day Off"; Transliteration: "Kyō wa o yasumi" (Japanese: 今日はお休み)	Satoshi Kuwabara	Mayumi Morita	Minoru Yamaoka	January 31, 2019	
Futaro studies at home when Itsuki arrives to give him his tutoring pay. Futaro attempts to decline because he has not succeeded in educating them all. However, Raiha persuades them both to take her out for a trip to the arcade, where they take pictures in a photo booth. They run into the other four quintuplets, who are all wearing yukata for the upcoming festival. That night, Yotsuba invites Raiha to see the fireworks with them, which Futaro agrees to, with the condition that they must first finish their schoolwork. Later, at the festival, Ichika flirts with Futaro but then takes a secretive phone call, while Yotsuba muses that Raiha would be her little sister if she were to marry Futaro one day. Miku explains to Futaro that watching the fireworks together is a special tradition for the quintuplets, as it reminds them of their deceased mother. Nino guides Futaro to a rooftop she had rented to watch the fireworks, but when the other girls fail to arrive, she reluctantly sends him to find them. He finds Ichika first, but is sent away by a moustache stranger. Bemused, Futaro next encounters Miku, who has injured her foot. They are mistaken for a couple by two women taking a survey, and Futaro unknowingly upsets Miku by denying that they are even friends. Spotting Itsuki, Futaro follows her, but is quickly dragged into an alley by Ichika, where she kabe-dons and warns him not to tell them about the encounter.
5	5	"Five Fifths"; Transliteration: "Zen'in de go-tōbun" (Japanese: 全員で五等分)	Fumio Maezono	Mayumi Morita	Satoshi Kuwabara; Kasumi Hasuo	February 7, 2019	
In the alley, Ichika explains to Futaro that she got a call from work and she will not watch the fireworks with her sisters this year. She sees the man from earlier and embraces Futaro so as to hide behind him. Futaro again dismisses the notion that he is friends with the quintuplets, which Ichika tells him is hurtful. Futaro feels guilty about Miku's earlier reaction, realizing that he hurt her feelings. Meanwhile, the man searching for Ichika accosts Miku, mistaking her for her sister. Futaro stops him and defensively declares that he is the quintuplets' "partner", stunning both Ichika and Miku. The man turns out to be Ichika's agent, calling her a "talented young actress," revealing her secret job. Futaro tries to persuade Ichika to stay, but she has an important audition and insists on going. Instead, he helps her run lines, ironically reading the part of a professor to her thankful student. Ichika arrives late to her audition, but wows the casting panel. When she returns, the festival ends, but Futaro brings her to the park, where her sisters are waiting for her with a mini-fireworks set. They forgive her for skipping out on their tradition. Ichika and Miku reach for the same sparkler (an implied metaphor for Futaro), but Ichika lets go, saying, "seems like you're pretty attached", and tells Futaro she will cooperate more in study sessions.
6	6	"What's Been Built Up"; Transliteration: "Tsumiageta mono" (Japanese: 積み上げたもの)	Yuuki Morita	Keiichirō Ōchi	Satoshi Kuwabara	February 14, 2019	
With midterms looming, Futaro fails to encourage Itsuki and Nino for a tutoring sessions, though Itsuki prefers to study alone. After skipping out on parfaits, Itsuki presents Futaro with her phone to communicate with their father, Maruo, where he learns that he will be fired if even a single one of them fails their exam. He argues with Itsuki, with both of them declaring that they will never work together again (something he quickly regrets). Back at the Nakano apartment, Futaro and the study group are playing The Game of Life when Nino attempts to eject him. Ichika pretends that Futaro had promised to stay overnight and ensure that he stays. While Futaro takes a bath, Nino pretends to be Itsuki and learns that he will be fired if any of them fail, much to her glee. When they resume studying, Miku asks what kind of girls Futaro likes, which he reveals in the style of a top-three countdown. He interests the girls in studying when he tells them he will reveal each step of the top three by each page they complete. As such, all three girls hurry to finish their pages, eager to know his answers. These are: always cheerful, good at cooking, and cares about her big brother (revealing that he was just talking about Raiha; he reiterates his lack of interest in dating). Ichika, who has been not-so-subtly setting up Futaro and Miku all evening, talks to him on the balcony, opining that he and Itsuki fight because they are so alike. Miku allows Futaro to sleep in her bed, rooming with Ichika for the night, but after waking up and using the bathroom, she forgets and returns to her own room. The next day, Futaro wakes up near Miku on a bed.
7	7	"Liar McLieface"; Transliteration: "Usotsuki usotarou" (Japanese: 嘘つき嘘たろう)	Fumihiro Yoshimura	Keiichirō Ōchi	Satoshi Kuwabara	February 21, 2019	
Over breakfast, Itsuki bemoans her difficulties in getting along with Futaro after their recent fight. Ichika playfully suggests that she disguise herself as Miku to talk to him, and Nino soon joins in. In Miku's room, Futaro wakes to find himself next to a sleeping Miku, deducing her identity from her pajamas. He sneaks out of the room, only to find himself confronted by "Miku" (Itsuki in disguise). He is not fooled and quickly retreats, much to her chagrin. Futaro, Ichika, and Yotsuba go to the library, where Ichika pretends to have left her pencil case at home to cover for Futaro, who is going back to speak to Itsuki. He encounters Miku halfway and tells her that he slept on the living room floor, a lie to save them both from embarrassment. Finding a sleeping Itsuki, and noticing she is using Miku's headphones, Futaro addresses her as Miku to get her to talk more openly. They both apologize for their fight. Futaro stays over for another night to help the quintuplets study for their midterm exams, which they almost miss by oversleeping. They all manage to sneak in past the supervisor by wearing Yotsuba's ribbon, who had arrived on time, making him believe the same girl is going in and out of the school. On their midterms, each quintuplet passes one subject out of five and Futaro prepares to be fired from work. However, much to everyone's surprise, Nino takes the phone and tricks their father by explaining that they "collectively" avoided failing all subjects (in that each of them passed a different subject) under Futaro's guidance, which is proof enough for him to keep Futaro occupied. With all of the quintuplets finally prepared to accept his tutoring, Futaro offers to take them for celebratory parfaits.
8	8	"The Photo that Started It All"; Transliteration: "Hajimari no shashin" (Japanese: 始まりの写真)	Ryou Miyata	Keiichirō Ōchi	Minoru Yamaoka	February 28, 2019	
Futaro tries to urge Nino and Itsuki to stay at home to study, but a ruse he set up with Yotsuba is discovered, and Nino and Itsuki angrily leave. Therefore, only Futaro and Yotsuba stay home, where she subtly tells him that she likes him. In the library, Ichika uses the handset photo, which contains the fact that she has given Futaro a lap pillow to demand him to get all quintuplets' contact information. However, Futaro forgets to take his student handbook owing to his curiosity and care about Yotsuba's sudden leave, which is to decline the invitation of the school women's basketball team. To retrieve the handbook, Futaro goes to Nino's room, where Nino happens to see a photo of a blonde, tough-looking guy who, unbeknownst to her, is actually Futaro five years prior. When asked about it, Futaro lies to her and tells her the picture is of a relative of his. Nino also reminds the quintuplets of their childhood life and takes out a photo album of their childhood. Multiple pictures show all five of the quintuplets looking exactly like each other, and they reminisce on how much they have changed since. As it turns out, one of the quintuplets encountered Futaro in that primary school's study tour in Kyoto five years prior and is present in the other half of the folded picture in Futaro's handbook.
9	9	"Legend of Fate Day 1"; Transliteration: "Musubi no densetsu Ichinichime" (Japanese: 結びの伝説 1日目)	Takayuki Chiba	Mayumi Morita	Satoshi Kuwabara	March 7, 2019	
Miku, disguised as Ichika, declines the confession and invitation from Maeda, one of Ichika's classmates. Futaro arrives and pretends to be "Ichika's" boyfriend and defend her. The heartbroken Maeda warns Futaro not to accompany Ichika during the field trip. The next day, Raiha falls ill and Futaro misses the school unit to look after her, despite her speedy recovery. However, the quintuplets all want Futaro to go. As a result, the six take their private car to the destination. However, due to the poor weather conditions, they are stuck on the snowy road. Therefore, they spend the night at the hotel, where they have to sleep in the same room, which triggers a debate between the quintuplets about who should sleep next to Futaro. To make it fair, the quintuplets all sleep alongside him. The next day, Ichika wakes up early and is attracted by Futaro's sleeping appearance. She sits on her knees, bending down, and gazing at him. However, Itsuki sees them but does not know the girl is Ichika, as the quintuplets all dress up similarly and thinks the girl is kissing Futaro.
10	10	"Legend of Fate Day 2"; Transliteration: "Musubi no densetsu Futsukame" (Japanese: 結びの伝説 2日目)	Takuo Suzuki	Mayumi Morita	Minoru Yamaoka	March 14, 2019	
A legend says that when couples dance and hold hands during the end of the campfire held at the event each year, the people involved will be together forever. The thought haunts Miku, who wishes to dance with Futaro but, having noticed Ichika's affection for him, decides to let her dance with him, wanting to be happy for her. Meanwhile, Futaro and Yotsuba dress as ghosts to scare others, but Ichika and Miku are not scared. Instead, they recognize Futaro wearing a blond wig. Later, they privately discuss what each thinks of Futaro. Meanwhile, Nino and Itsuki get scared, prompting them to run in the wrong direction and get lost in the forest. Worrying for them, Futaro saves Nino from falling off the cliff, but she mistakes him for the boy in the picture she saw in Futaro's handbook, because of the blonde wig. Playing along, Futaro addresses himself as Kintarō, Futaro's "relative," and seeing Nino scared, gives her a lucky amulet given to him by Raiha. Seeing a small bruise on his head, Nino gives Kintarō a patterned bandage. Nino, smitten by Kintarō, invites him to dance in the campfire. Later, Futaro, Ichika, and Yotsuba carry logs from a warehouse for the campfire, but Futaro and Ichika are locked in purposefully by Yotsuba. Unable to escape, Ichika explains to him that she is supposed to dance with him per Maeda's dare, and Futaro remembers he also has to dance with Nino. He tries to call off his dance with Ichika, telling her to settle things on her own with Maeda. However, Ichika sheds tears, as she genuinely wanted to dance with Futaro.
11	11	"Legend of Fate Day 3"; Transliteration: "Musubi no densetsu Mikkame" (Japanese: 結びの伝説 3日目)	Midori Yoshizawa	Keiichirō Ōchi	Satoshi Kuwabara	March 21, 2019	
When Futaro lights a fire with some nearby wood, Ichika expresses to him with her desire to take a break from school to pursue her acting career. Futaro congratulates her for her ambitions and the possibility of doing things she likes. Seeing a small campfire, Ichika invites Futaro to dance together. However, he explains the legend to Ichika, who understands why the campfire is so important to Miku. Before the log collapses, Futaro saves Ichika. However, the log activates the anti-burglar alarm, and the fire also activates the overhead sprinkler system, completely soaking them. Miku and Itsuki arrive, and demand an explanation from them, but they are reluctant to believe them. Having subsided the incident, they go skiing. Ichika catches a cold, but sneaks out, so Futaro will not tell anyone about the incident. Unable to ski, Futaro crashes into a tree, knocking off the bandage Nino put on him the night before. Nino sees it and tries to catch who she thinks is Kintarō. Futaro leaves her, and finds a distraught Miku hiding in a small igloo. The two, unable to escape due to Nino's presence, talk for a while, as Miku realizes how sensible Futaro is at understanding her and her siblings. As he leaves, she communicates with Ichika, telling her that there is something they must talk about.
12	12	"Legend of Fate Day 2000"; Transliteration: "Musubi no densetsu 2000-nichime" (Japanese: 結びの伝説 2000日目)	Fumihiro Yoshimura	Keiichirō Ōchi	Satoshi Kuwabara	March 28, 2019	
Miku reveals to Ichika through the phone that she finally wants to gain independence for her feelings and tells her that they should both hold Futaro's hands during the campfire. "Ichika," who has actually been Itsuki this whole time, posing as Ichika, is stunned by Miku's words. Futaro and the girls have not seen Itsuki in a while, so they decide to find her. Ichika takes Futaro to a ropeway, where she reveals that she is actually Itsuki, having disguised herself under a facemask. However, Futaro collapses from having a fever. Itsuki takes him to the counselors, who confine him in his room to rest. Before going to his room, though, Futaro "rejects" Nino by claiming Kintarō told him that something came up and he could not dance with Nino. As a consequence, Nino attends the campfire by herself. Meanwhile, Miku confesses her feelings for Futaro to Ichika, telling her that she is done holding back for her sister's sake and wants to win his affection. Ichika understands, and they embrace. Yotsuba and Itsuki find Futaro's camping guide, in which he wrote lots of stories to take home for Raiha. They realize that despite being sick, Futaro has actually enjoyed the trip and wishes it would not end in such misery for him. As such, Itsuki sneaks into the ward to look after him. Much to her surprise, all the other girls were hiding in the ward, as they were all worried about him. They approach him as the countdown for the campfire event ends outside. Several years later, it is Futaro's wedding ceremony. Futaro has forgotten the wedding ring at home, so he calls Raiha to help him. Raiha retrieves the ring for him and finds that he still wears the lucky amulet she gave him five years ago. As it turns out, all five girls had held hands with him in bed as the campfire ended all those years back, and he is marrying one of them, whose identity is still unknown. In a mid-credits scene, the girls reunite with Futaro, who had to spend time hospitalized. Nino returns Futaro his lucky amulet as all the girls prepare to study with him for their upcoming finals.
