= List of science fiction comedy films =

This is a list of science fiction comedy films.

Title	Year
A Bomb Was Stolen	1962
A Grand Day Out	1989
Aachi & Ssipak	2006
Abbott and Costello Go to Mars	1953
Abbott and Costello Meet Dr. Jekyll and Mr. Hyde	1953
Abbott and Costello Meet Frankenstein	1948
Abbott and Costello Meet the Invisible Man	1951
The Absent-Minded Professor	1961
The Adventures of Buckaroo Banzai Across the 8th Dimension	1984
The Adventures of Pluto Nash	2002
Airplane II: The Sequel	1982
Americathon	1979
Another Wild Idea	1934
Ant-Man	2015
Aqua Teen Hunger Force Colon Movie Film for Theaters	2008
The Atomic Kid	1954
Attack the Block	2011
Attack of the 60 Foot Centerfold	1995
Attack of the Killer Tomatoes	1978
Back to the Future	1985
Back to the Future Part II	1989
Back to the Future Part III	1990
Bad Taste	1987
Barbarella	1968
*batteries not included	1987
The Big Bus	1976
Big Meat Eater	1982
Bill & Ted Face the Music	2020
Bill & Ted's Bogus Journey	1991
Bill & Ted's Excellent Adventure	1989
Bloodsuckers from Outer Space	1984
Brazil	1985
The Cat from Outer Space	1978
Cherry 2000	1987
Chicken Little	2005
Cloudy with a Chance of Meatballs	2009
Cloudy with a Chance of Meatballs 2	2013
Clockstoppers	2002
Cocoon	1985
Cocoon: The Return	1988
The Computer Wore Tennis Shoes	1969
Coneheads	1993
The Creature Wasn't Nice, aka Naked Space, aka Spaceship	1983
Critters	1986
Critters 2: The Main Course	1988
Critters 3: You Are What They Eat	1991
Critters 4: They're Invading Your Space	1991
Dark Star	1974
The Day the Earth Blew Up: A Looney Tunes Movie	2024
Dead and Deader	2006
Demolition Man	1993
Diabolical Tales	2005
Dude, Where's My Car?	2000
Earth Girls Are Easy	1988
Escape from Planet Earth	2013
Evolution	2001
Explorers	1985
The Fifth Element	1997
Flash Gordon	1980
Flatland	2007
Flesh Gordon	1974
Flubber	1997
Freaked	1993
Frequently Asked Questions About Time Travel	2009
Friend of the World	2020
G.O.R.A.	2004
Gaganachari	2024
Galaxina	1980
Galaxy Quest	1999
Ghostbusters	1984
Ghostbusters	2016
Ghostbusters II	1989
Ghostbusters: Afterlife	2021
Ghostbusters: Frozen Empire	2024
Good Luck, Have Fun, Don't Die	2025
Die Gstettensaga: The Rise of Echsenfriedl	2014
Guardians of the Galaxy	2014
Guardians of the Galaxy Vol. 2	2017
Guardians of the Galaxy Vol. 3	2023
Hardware Wars (short)	1977
Have Rocket, Will Travel	1959
Heartbeeps	1981
The History of Future Folk	2012
The Hitchhiker's Guide to the Galaxy	2005
Honey, I Blew Up the Kid	1992
Honey, I Shrunk the Kids	1989
Honey, We Shrunk Ourselves	1997
Hoppers	2026
Hot Tub Time Machine	2010
Hot Tub Time Machine 2	2015
Howard the Duck	1986
The Ice Pirates	1984
Idiocracy	2006
Illegal Aliens	2006
The Incredible Shrinking Woman	1981
Innerspace	1987
The Invisible Woman	1940
James vs. His Future Self	2019
Jekyll and Hyde... Together Again	1982
Jimmy Neutron: Boy Genius	2001
Just Imagine	1930
Kenny Begins	2009
Killer Klowns from Outer Space	1988
Kin-dza-dza! (Russian)	1986
Kung Fury	2015
The Last Starfighter	1984
Leprechaun 4: In Space	1997
Leroy & Stitch	2006
Lilo & Stitch	2002
Lobster Man from Mars	1989
The Lost Skeleton of Cadavra	2001
Making Mr. Right	1987
Man with the Screaming Brain	2005
The Man with Two Brains	1983
Mars Attacks!	1996
Martians Go Home	1990
Mom and Dad Save the World	1992
Monsters vs. Aliens	2009
Morons from Outer Space	1985
The Mouse on the Moon	1963
Multiplicity	1996
Muppets from Space	1999
My Favorite Martian	1999
My Science Project	1985
My Stepmother Is an Alien	1988
Mystery Science Theater 3000: The Movie	1996
Night of the Comet	1984
Now You See Him, Now You Don't	1972
The Nutty Professor	1963
The Nutty Professor	1996
Nutty Professor II: The Klumps	2000
Palm Springs	2020
Paul	2011
Planet 51	2009
The President's Analyst	1967
Robots	2005
Re-Animator	1985
Real Genius	1985
Repo! The Genetic Opera	2008
Repo Man	1984
The Return of the Living Dead	1985
RocketMan	1997
The Rocky Horror Picture Show	1975
Ron's Gone Wrong	2021
Roujin Z	1991
Seksmisja (Polish)	1984
Shock Treatment	1981
Short Circuit	1986
Short Circuit 2	1988
Simon	1980
Slapstick of Another Kind	1982
Sleeper	1973
Son of Flubber	1963
Space Jam	1996
Space Jam: A New Legacy	2021
Space Station 76	2014
Space Truckers	1996
Spaceballs	1987
The Star Wars Holiday Special (TV)	1978
Star Wreck: In the Pirkinning	2005
Starship Dave	2008
The Stepford Wives	2004
The Strongest Man in the World	1975
The Stuff	1985
Tank Girl	1995
The Three Stooges in Orbit	1962
The Three Stooges Meet Hercules	1962
Thor: Ragnarok	2017
Thumb Wars (short)	1999
Time Bandits	1981
A Trip to the Moon	1902
Unidentified Flying Oddball	1979
Untitled Earth Sim 64 (short)	2021
Visitors from the Galaxy (Yugoslav)	1981
WALL-E	2008
Wallace & Gromit: The Curse of the Were-Rabbit	2005
Weird Science	1985
Who Wants to Kill Jessie?	1966
The World's End	2013
Young Frankenstein	1974
Zenon: Girl of the 21st Century (TV)	1999
Zenon: The Zequel (TV)	2001
Zenon: Z3 (TV)	2003
Zombie Strippers	2008

== See also ==
- Lists of science fiction films
- Lists of comedy films
- List of science fiction horror films
- List of science fiction action films
