= The Quintessential Quintuplets season 2 =

2021 anime television series

The Quintessential Quintuplets
- Season 2
- Anime key visual
- No. of episodes: 12

Release
- Original network: TBS
- Original release: January 8 – March 26, 2021

Season chronology
- ← Previous; Season 1

The Quintessential Quintuplets (Japanese: 五等分の花嫁, Hepburn: Go-Tōbun no Hanayome; lit. "Quintuplet Brides"), also known as 5-Tōbun no Hanayome, is an anime television series based on shōnen manga series written and illustrated by Negi Haruba. The second season's title is stylized as The Quintessential Quintuplets ∬.

The series is licensed in North America under Crunchyroll–Funimation partnership. A second season was announced in a special event for the first season on May 5, 2019. Kaori replaced Satoshi Kuwabara as the director of the season, and Keiichirō Ōchi returned to write the scripts. Bibury Animation Studios replaced Tezuka Productions as the animation studio. The season was originally scheduled to premiere in October 2020, but due to issues caused by the COVID-19 pandemic, the series was delayed to air from January 8 to March 26, 2021. The opening theme song is "The shape of the Quintuplets" (五等分のカタチ, "Go-Tōbun no Katachi") and the ending theme song is "First Love" (はつこい, "Hatsukoi") are performed by the Nakano Family Quintuplets (中野家の五つ子, Nakano-ke no Itsutsugo). The ending theme of the last episode is "Quintuplet Feelings" (五等分の気持ち, Gotōbun no Kimochi) also performed by the Nakano Family Quintuplets (中野家の五つ子, Nakano-ke no Itsutsugo), which was also the opening of the first season.

Two original video animation episodes for the anime series, The Quintessential Quintuplets ∽, is set after the second season. It is later followed by the anime film The Quintessential Quintuplets Movie.

== Episode list ==
Story	Episode	Title (Note: All English titles are taken from Crunchyroll.)	Directed by	Written by	Storyboarded by	Original release date	Ref.
13	1	"Quite the Crappy Kyoto Quagmire"; Transliteration: "Kyō to Kyōto no Kyō to Tomo" (Japanese: 今日と京都の凶と共)	Kaori	Keiichirō Ōchi	Kaori	January 8, 2021	
Futaro stays in the hospital due to the cold he got during the school camp turning into a serious case of the flu. The doctor visiting him triggers some memories of the girl Futaro met during the school trip to Kyoto five years before. The quintuplets all visit him, and Itsuki brings him a good luck charm identical to the one the girl from his memories had bought in Kyoto. After being discharged, Futaro goes to the quintuplets' apartment, seeing Ichika out from the shower. Unable to recognize her, as well as the zero-point tests she threw at him in the heat of the moment, Futaro challenges himself to recognize the five sisters with identical hairstyles, failing spectacularly. Itsuki wonders if Futaro tries to find out the identity of the girl from his past, but he dismisses the idea of her being one of the quintuplets as the girl would not have grown into such a poor student after promising to study hard.
14	2	"Seven Goodbyes Part 1"; Transliteration: "Nanatsu no Sayonara Daiisshō" (Japanese: 七つのさよなら 第一章)	Yūichirō Aoki; Ippei Ichii	Keiichirō Ōchi	Taizō Yoshida	January 15, 2021	
A week before the final exams, Futaro stays up all night preparing practice tests for the quintuplets, manually handwriting study guides for each of them. The session goes downhill when Nino starts arguing with Miku and does not do the mock tests. Miku and Itsuki defend Futaro, and plead for Nino to be compliant. Nino disregards about Futaro and smacks the papers to the ground. When Itsuki slaps Nino in retaliation, she does the same to her back and leaves the apartment, along with Itsuki. The next day, Futaro and Miku search for Itsuki and Nino. They find Nino staying at a luxury hotel, though she does not leave. Futaro finds out that Itsuki came to his home to stay after her quarrel with Nino, becoming increasingly close to Raiha and his father. That night, Itsuki tells Futaro that the quintuplets used to live in poverty, as their mother was single until she married their father. The next day, Futaro discovers that Yotsuba is again helping the track club for an upcoming marathon, despite their final exams coming up. Futaro wonders alone if the quintuplets really need him in their lives when the girl he met years ago in Kyoto appears.
15	3	"Seven Goodbyes Part 2"; Transliteration: "Nanatsu no Sayonara Dainishō" (Japanese: 七つのさよなら 第二章)	Shigeru Kimiya	Keiichirō Ōchi	Ryōma Mizuno	January 22, 2021	
After his encounter with the girl from his past, Futaro falls into the lake and returns to Nino's hotel. The two talk, and Nino asks what happened. A flashback shows Futaro's encounter with the girl from before, who calls herself Rena. She states that maybe she should disappear, so Futaro will not be shackled by the past anymore. She takes the photo from his handbook with her, before saying goodbye to him. Trying to catch her, Futaro falls from the boat into the water. Nino tries to cheer him up, saying there must be someone in the world who would fall for a guy like him. Futaro notices that Nino actually saved the study guide he had made for her and has been studying by herself since. Nino apologizes for her behavior, but she does not apologize to Itsuki. Futaro tells Nino that his encounter with Rena made him realize the need to leave the past behind. Nino admits that she could move forward after seeing Kintarō one last time to say goodbye. Futaro offers to help her meet him again, and though conflicted, he visits Nino disguised as Kintarō. As he arrives with the disguise, Nino constantly runs off, and calls Futaro on his phone to ask him for advice on how to approach Kintarō. Feeling nervous about asking Kintarō out, Nino summons Futaro to the hotel's cafeteria. Nino thanks Futaro, giving him a glass of tea as a reward. However, similar to their first encounter, she has laced the tea with sleeping aids, revealing she knew of Futaro's deception from the beginning. The next day at school, Nino is still absent. Another issue arises when Yotsuba agrees to help the track team in their upcoming marathon. Meanwhile, Miku visits Nino at the hotel.
16	4	"Seven Goodbyes Part 3"; Transliteration: "Nanatsu no Sayonara Daisanshō" (Japanese: 七つのさよなら 第三章)	Kento Shintani	Keiichirō Ōchi	Kaori; Kento Shintani	January 29, 2021	
While Futaro, Ichika, and Itsuki try to find a way to get Yotsuba from the track club, Nino and Miku talk about Futaro. When Itsuki fails to trick the track club captain dressed as Yotsuba, Nino arrives to do it, revealing that she cut her hair short. Yotsuba chooses to confront the track club herself, while Nino and Itsuki reconcile. With the sisters finally reunited, the study sessions resume. However, after a failed result, Futaro offers some cheating papers for the girls. The day after the exams, Ebata, the Nakanos' personal driver, informs the girls that he had temporarily replaced Futaro, and that he will not return to the apartment. The girls open up the cheating papers Futaro left for them to discover a farewell message. The sisters realize about him and ask Ebata for help. The girls surprise Futaro at his job and reveal that they have moved to a modest residence, so Futaro will tutor them until the end. Futaro fails to retrieve the apartment keycards from the river that Yotsuba discards. When the sisters jump into the water, Futaro saves Nino. Futaro decides to cut ties with his past and Rena, and he agrees to continue tutoring the girls voluntarily.
17	5	"Good Work Today"; Transliteration: "Kyō wa Otsukare" (Japanese: 今日はお疲れ)	Yūichirō Aoki	Keiichirō Ōchi	Kaori; Ryōma Mizuno	February 5, 2021	
Maruo recalls when Futaro called him out for being a neglectful father, the day he expressed his resignation. In the present, Futaro and Raiha meet with the quintuplets for New Year's. While discussing how they will eventually pay him, the sisters surprise Futaro by having finished their winter homework without being asked. Nino reveals that Ichika has been working in multiple acting roles in order to keep a steady income and discusses the possibility that they should all be getting part-time jobs themselves. However, Futaro suggests they should focus on studying for the time being. While searching for a job, Itsuki gets a phone call from her father. Futaro later accompanies Yotsuba and Nino to buy groceries. Nino is conflicted about her feelings for Futaro. On the way back, they overhear their father and Itsuki talking in a nearby café. Maruo wants them to return to their apartment, but Itsuki refuses. Yotsuba intervenes, and they make a deal: if the girls pass their final exams, Futaro will return to the apartment and be re-hired as their tutor, but if they fail, they will transfer schools again.
18	6	"The Last Exam"; Transliteration: "Saigo no Shiken" (Japanese: 最後の試験)	Mitsutaka Noshitani	Keiichirō Ōchi	Kaori; Mitsutaka Noshitani	February 12, 2021	
Futaro is determined that all of the quintuplets will pass their final exams. The day finally arrives, and the sisters recall everything they went through over the course of two months to get to that day. Miku has been practicing chocolate-making for Valentine's Day to give it to Futaro, and Ichika convinces Nino to help her with it. While visiting her mother's grave, Itsuki meets with Shimoda, a former student of Rena Nakano who decided to follow in her footsteps. Shimoda explains that despite Rena's relentless scolding in school, everyone, including herself, greatly admired her. Shimoda offers to support Itsuki should she decide to pursue a career in teaching like her mother did. Later, Ichika tricks Futaro into going to the library to keep him away, while Miku and Nino make chocolates. Futaro decides they should take a day off for a trip to an amusement park. Yotsuba separates herself from the group, and Futaro finds her trying to study inside a cabin on the Ferris Wheel. Yotsuba reveals to Futaro that they all used to attend a prestigious school, but they were warned of the consequences when they began to fail. They took remedial exams, but only Yotsuba failed them. In solidarity with Yotsuba, all the sisters declined re-entry into the school. Futaro realizes that the quintuplets can help each other with their individual areas of academic expertise, and creates a new study plan. Before the exams, Miku reveals to Ichika that she intends to reveal her feelings to Futaro if she gets the highest scores. All of the quintuplets pass their final exams and are reunited in the bakery to reveal their results. Miku is stunned to learn that Ichika got the highest score, two points ahead of her. Futaro decides to search for Nino, who has left, so they all can celebrate together.
19	7	"Begin the Offensive"; Transliteration: "Kōryaku Kaishi" (Japanese: 攻略開始)	Ippei Ichii	Keiichirō Ōchi	Taizō Yoshida	February 19, 2021	
Nino has gone to talk to Maruo, who acknowledges their accomplishment and accepts Futaro's success as a tutor, but also pleads for the quintuplets to return to the apartment, which Nino refuses to do. Futaro arrives on his boss' motorbike to pick her up. On the ride to the restaurant, Nino gathers her courage and softly tells Futaro that she loves him. After the celebration, Nino speaks to Futaro about their encounter. When she realizes that he ignored her confession, Nino reiterates to Futaro her affection, shocking him. Ichika accidentally overhears this and realizes Nino is getting ahead in the "race" for Futaro. He wins a trip to Toraiwa Hot Springs, bringing along his father and Raiha. He quickly runs into the Nakano quintuplets, who have come with their father for a family vacation. Futaro starts seeing Itsuki everywhere, though, unbeknownst to him, all of the sisters are dressed as Itsuki. Futaro finds a note telling him to meet in the garden at midnight, which he assumes is from Itsuki. Later, one of the sisters tells Futaro they should end their relationship. Futaro learns that the innkeeper is the girls' grandfather. The next day, Itsuki calls Futaro to ask why he never showed up. They agree to meet at the mixed baths to talk. Their chat is interrupted by Nino, who wants to join Futaro in the bath, but leaves upset when he does not recognize her. Futaro speaks about how they have all changed since they met him. Itsuki tells him that he is no longer a tutor, but a friend.
20	8	"Scrambled Eggs"; Transliteration: "Sukuranburu Eggu" (Japanese: スクランブルエッグ)	Takayuki Kitagawa	Keiichirō Ōchi	Ikurō Morimoto	February 26, 2021	
Futaro attempts to guess the identity of the fake Itsuki from the first night. However, he cannot tell the sisters apart, so he talks privately with each of the girls until Yotsuba gives herself away. She explains the shock she caused their grandfather when she was the first to begin dressing differently, so the girls assume Itsuki's appearance whenever they visit him, as he preferred when they all look the same. In the hot springs, Nino tells Ichika that she plans to do her best to win Futaro's love, even if it means trampling others in the process. Ichika, similarly infatuated with Futaro, attempts to stop her, but is helpless against her confidence. Futaro asks the innkeeper how to tell the girls apart. He tells him that there is love. Their grandfather simply pays attention to the voices and mannerisms of the girls. Nino plans to meet alone with Futaro, and she asks Ichika for help distracting her father. Yotsuba finds Ichika crying on the rooftop. Yotsuba advises her to do what she wants to do and have no regrets. Ichika fails to distract their father, who discovers Nino in her and Futaro's meeting spot. The next day, Futaro meets with Miku, disguised as Itsuki. He first identifies her as Ichika, which deeply upsets her and causes her to turn to leave. However, Futaro correctly identifies her as Miku after noticing that she is clenching her fist. Delighted, Miku runs and embraces Futaro. As the vacation ends, the innkeeper asks Futaro to tell his granddaughters to be true to themselves. Futaro goes to check on the Bell of Vows, which, similar to the campfire, has a legend stating that couples that ring the bell will be together forever. Suddenly, an unseen girl running towards him tackles him to the ground, causing the bell to ring.
21	9	"Welcome to Class 3-1"; Transliteration: "Yōkoso San Nen Ichi Kumi" (Japanese: ようこそ3年1組)	Kazuomi Koga	Keiichirō Ōchi	Taizō Yoshida	March 5, 2021	
The quintuplets look for jobs to help support Ichika for the rent. Miku and Nino compete for an opening at the bakery where Futaro works. They decide via a cook-off, which Nino easily wins. Miku applies to work at the neighboring bakery as she simply likes to bake. At the start of their third year, the quintuplets are placed in the same class as Futaro, where their curious classmates question them. Yotsuba volunteers for herself and Futaro as class reps. Futaro inadvertently teaches the other classmates how to tell the siblings apart, by explaining their defining accessories. Miku hopes to find Futaro the perfect birthday gift. At the bakery, Nino tries to adjust to the hectic workload while dealing with her relationship with Futaro, who has been keeping his distance, despite her newfound friendliness. Futaro admits that his nervousness is because he has never had someone confess to him before. Nino says that she will do anything in her power to prove her love, calling him "Fu-kun", a nickname Miku had previously invented. A jealous Ichika tries to spend more time alone with Futaro. After school, Ichika wears Miku's signature headphones, and Futaro mistakes her for Miku. Ichika uses this opportunity to tell Futaro as "Miku" that Ichika likes him, and that they would be a good couple, much to his surprise.
22	10	"Five Cranes in Return"; Transliteration: "Gowazuru no Ongaeshi" (Japanese: 五羽鶴の恩返し)	Yoshihisa Matsumoto	Keiichirō Ōchi	Taizō Yoshida	March 12, 2021	
Futaro is approached by fellow classmate Yusuke Takeda, who reveals that Futaro's class ranking slipped during the finals from Futaro tutoring the quintuplets. Takeda suggests Futaro to stop tutoring, but Futaro defends his choice, declaring that the girls will pass the test and he will make it into the Top 10 of the upcoming national mock exams. Ichika reveals her feelings for Futaro to Nino, and they resolve to compete for his love. The sisters decide to postpone Futaro's birthday gift-giving until exams are over so as not to distract him. On Futaro's birthday, Itsuki tells him she began interning at a cram school. After the exam, Futaro surpasses Takeda, placing 3rd nationally and earning his admiration. The girls present their gifts to Futaro. Miku tells Yotsuba that she wants to prepare a lunch for Futaro on their upcoming school trip. Yotsuba tries to help set them up together, but Ichika interferes. Raiha tells Futaro to get Yotsuba a thank-you gift for her help during the school camp. After looking at things her sisters like at the mall, Futaro asks Yotsuba what she wants. They go to a park that Yotsuba frequents and have fun talking on the swings. While cleaning at home, Ichika discovers the picture of Futaro and "Rena", knowing that "Rena" is one of the sisters. Yotsuba, despite not physically receiving anything from Futaro, explains to him that she already got what she wanted, which was to spend time with him and see him smile.
23	11	"Sisters War: Part 1"; Transliteration: "Shisutāzu Wō Zenhan Sen" (Japanese: シスターズウォー 前半戦)	Akiko Seki	Keiichirō Ōchi	Ikurō Morimoto	March 19, 2021	
Raiha takes Futaro out shopping, and invites Itsuki and Yotsuba to join them. Raiha mentions Rena, calling her Futaro's "first love." On the bus heading towards Fushimi Inari-taisha during a school trip to Kyoto, Yotsuba learns that Miku made lunch for Futaro. The girls decide to play a card game with the losers having to obey the winner. Once they arrive at the shrine, the sisters follow behind Futaro and his friends up the mountain shrine, and when the path splits, Yotsuba, having won the card game, orders Itsuki, Ichika, and Nino to go up one path, while she and Miku go up the other. Ichika, determined to win Futaro's love at any cost, sneaks away to make it to the top first while in her Miku disguise to fool Futaro. However, both Yotsuba and Miku arrive shortly after, and discover what she is trying to do. Yotsuba chastises Ichika for getting in the way of Miku's confession. Futaro overhears this, and Miku sprints down the mountain, crying. Nino tears into Ichika for betraying Miku, but she defends herself by stating she does not want to hear that from Nino, reminding her that she said before she would let no one get in her way, even asking her how they are any different. Nino replies that she values their bond as sisters just as much, if not more so than she does, and adds that she would have been happy for her if Futaro had chosen her. Later, Futaro admits to Yotsuba that he is already aware of Miku's feelings. The next day, Itsuki tries to get closer to Futaro. Nino confronts Miku, who has been depressed in her room by herself. Nino tells Miku that she will use this opportunity to make Futaro hers if Miku gives up, but encourages her not to do so if she truly loves him. Itsuki tells Yotsuba to tell Futaro the truth that Yotsuba is "Rena," the girl from Futaro's picture.
24	12	"Sisters War: Part 2"; Transliteration: "Shisutāzu Wō Kōhan Sen" (Japanese: シスターズウォー 後半戦)	Kaori	Keiichirō Ōchi	Kaori	March 26, 2021	
Miku admits to Nino that she is scared and not good enough for Futaro, but says that she has not given up yet. Ichika, disguised as Miku, asks Futaro about meeting Rena six years ago. She invites him for a walk down the same pathway he and "Rena" took all those years ago, but it begins to rain. After reminiscing, Futaro stops her, explaining that he knows that she is Ichika and that she was the "Miku" from before, too, and he is done playing her games. She tells him she is actually "Rena", but Futaro does not believe her, calls out her lies, and storms off angrily, leaving Ichika devastated. The next day, all students are divided into five activities, and the girls agree to go on different activities, leaving it to luck who will go to the same as Futaro. Knowing which course Futaro is taking, Ichika, wanting to redeem herself for what she did, gets Miku to take it. However, as they arrive, they all realize they have taken part in the same activity as Futaro in order to help Miku. Nino apologizes to Ichika, stating she would have done the same thing she did and the two reconcile. Futaro and Miku both sit by themselves on a bench, as the sisters hide under a wall behind them, overhearing what they say. Miku begins pointing at different historical structures around them, exclaiming that she loves them, before presumably pointing at Futaro and saying, "I love you". Ichika, Nino, Itsuki, and Yotsuba all embrace while crying, happy to see Miku finally succeed. However, Miku reveals that she never pointed at Futaro, but rather at her sisters behind, knowing they were there the whole time. Massively confused, Futaro walks away, wondering what to believe. Miku thanks the girls and they reconnect, while Ichika apologizes to Miku for what she did. Later, when Ichika also apologizes to Futaro, she kisses him on the cheek and says everything was a "lie." Five years later, as the sisters look through a photo album, Futaro and the bride are about to seal their vows with a kiss. One of the sisters reveals that the couple had their first kiss while staying at their grandfather's inn. Privately, Futaro reminisces about that same day when "she" became special to him, revealing the moment when one of the quintuplets, dressed as Itsuki, had tackled and kissed him under the Bell of Vows, causing it to ring.
