= Talkback with Jerry Galvin =

Jerry Galvin hosted Talkback, a humorous radio talk show that aired first in Cincinnati, Ohio, on WAIF, and later was aired on 66 NPR stations.

== History ==
The long description below was written and published by devoted followers of Jerry Galvin’s radio years. But Jerry’s obituary, written by Jerry long before he died, offers a more complete summary of the ups and downs of his life. The obit is at the bottom here.

Talkback was a parody of America's traditional call-in radio talk shows of the 1970s. Such shows in that era were always devoted to serious topics. Paradoxically, no religion or politics were usually allowed. In 1975 Jerry Galvin began a weekly program that used what he termed a "radio scam" as the show's theme each week. Each show was launched with Galvin telling a stream-of-consciousness, unscripted story about something that happened to him or was about to happen to the listeners or to the world. The stories were generally either partially or totally untrue. Once the phone lines were opened for comments, two distinct types of callers were heard. Those who got the joke and improvisationally advanced that night's fake story. And those who were upset or outraged by the story.

Host Galvin was a Cincinnati ad executive best known for teaming up with Jay Gilbert to create commercials promoting all Cincinnati radio stations with their imaginary Plummet Mall.

The Talkback "cast" consisted of several dozen regulars, many of whom would call weekly to play along with whatever phony topic or riff Jerry set up. After the show developed its stable of regular callers, shows would sometimes be built around the regulars themselves interacting, such as on-air wedding ceremonies between them.

Tipping his hand and hinting at the show's satirical nature, Jerry often described his clothing as "the same each day: Hush Puppy knockoffs, argyle socks, plaid Bermuda shorts, a Hawaiian shirt, and a pith helmet." Jerry often teased the station where his show originated by referring to WAIF as a station with a signal so weak the best reception was in the parking lot. He also described his most famous screener, Lynn Wendell as "Our Lady in Leather," wearing leather S&M gear (in contrast to most radio talk shows whose official on-air policy was not to mention the screener at all). While Lynn was never a voice heard during the shows, her toughness was often discussed by callers. She would simply hang up on anyone who didn't have a funny enough idea to keep the show moving.

In the 1980s after Talkback received a front page feature in the Wall Street Journal and was also featured on NBC’s The Today Show, the program was nationally distributed to National Public Radio stations. The name of the show was changed to TalkTalk with Jerry Galvin after producers of a Los Angeles show named Talkback threatened a lawsuit.

The program underwent one more name change to "It's Those Stupid Galvins Again," when Jerry's brother Jene joined Jerry for the weekly programs that by then aired on WVXU in Cincinnati. The improvisational, scam-based format remained unchanged throughout the show's more than 30-year run.

In 2026 Jerry Galvin provided the following obituary about himself, written by him long before he died.

PRE DEATH OBITUARY FOR JERRY GALVIN

Jerry Galvin doesn’t know whether or not he died peacefully in his sleep, since I’m Jerry writing this while I’m still alive and quite well. However, I did officially die on ________. Robin Galvin — you’ll meet her a few sentences from now — put in that correct date because, as I said, I’m not dead yet.

After being born in 1940 in Cincinnati and educated there, I decided to leave the area when I saw a poster at Xavier University announcing that Loyola of Chicago was looking for the top 100 Jesuit scholars to help found a Loyola campus in Italy. I applied, was accepted, and shamelessly flaunted my top-scholar status. But I discovered, when I arrived at the new Rome campus, that any student with $1,100 and a heartbeat qualified as a top scholar.

After returning to America, I wasted two years spinning records for a couple of small radio stations before realizing I was, at best, a mediocre disc jockey. So I got a job in production and eventually sales at a vastly larger station. After a few years of that, I put radio employment in my rear view mirror and opened an advertising agency in Cincinnati, where I could be my own boss, which I loved.

Despite my disastrous “Buy High, Sell Low” investment strategy, my ad business prospered, so I dabbled in radio as a hobby. Not spinning records — just talking. What followed were decades of Sunday night comedic shows on public radio, eventually carried by 66 stations in the country, I’d open each program with a made up outrageous story of some sort guaranteed to generate calls from furious listeners. Those listeners were offset by creative callers who helped wring more comedy out of the fake stories. Among the most creative callers was one named Robin. I eventually managed to get her last name, and tracked her down. We fell in love (obvious to sharp listeners) and married. When my 62nd birthday rolled around, I sold my advertising agency, quit my radio hobby, and devoted the next twenty years to writing and producing ads and commercials as a consultant before fully retiring and finally, dying.

As for the afterlife, I’m probably just now getting used to it. Robin’ll now put some traditional obituary information here.

ROBIN TO FILL IN TRADITIONAL OBIT INFO
