= TalkBack Reader Response System =

The TalkBack Reader Response System was one of the first systems used on the Internet to allow people to respond to articles posted on a website. It was first used at Jesse Berst's ZDNet Anchordesk news site. It was created by Jon C. A. DeKeles.

== Principle ==
The TalkBack system of Anchordesk allowed readers, once they came to a site, to respond by a form on the screen. This data was then sent by email to the editors, and was also written to a data file. The data was imported into a custom Access Database Publishing system. The editor could approve the post, and also respond. It was one of the first interactive systems created for use on the Internet with a news publication.

Anchordesk was one of the first sites that used email to send news to readers on a daily basis. At one point, emails went out to almost 3 million people a day.
