= Freeware =

Software distributed and used at no cost, with other rights still reserved

Freeware is software, often proprietary, that is distributed at no monetary cost to the end user. There is no agreed-upon set of rights, license, or EULA that defines freeware unambiguously; every publisher defines its own rules for the freeware it offers. For instance, modification, redistribution by third parties, and reverse engineering are permitted by some publishers but prohibited by others. Unlike with free and open-source software, which are also often distributed free of charge, the source code for freeware is typically not made available. Freeware may be intended to benefit its producer by, for example, encouraging sales of a more capable version, as in the freemium and shareware business models; or by collecting and selling users' personal data.

== History ==
The term freeware was coined in 1982 by Andrew Fluegelman, who wanted to sell PC-Talk, the communications application he had created, outside of commercial distribution channels. Fluegelman distributed the program via the same process as shareware. As software types can change, freeware can change into shareware.

In the 1980s and 1990s, the term freeware was often applied to software released without source code.

== Definitions ==
=== Software license ===
Freeware software is available for use without charge and typically has limited functionality with a more capable version available commercially or as shareware. It is typically fully functional for an unlimited period of time.

In contrast to what the Free Software Foundation calls free software, the author of freeware usually restricts the rights of the user to use, copy, distribute, modify, make derivative works, or reverse engineer the software. The software license may impose additional usage restrictions; for instance, the license may be "free for private, non-commercial use" only, or usage over a network, on a server, or in combination with certain other software packages may be prohibited. Restrictions may be required by license or enforced by the software itself; e.g., the package may fail to function over a network.

=== Relation to other forms of software licensing ===
This Venn diagram describes the typical relationship between freeware and open source software: According to David Rosen from Wolfire Games in 2010, open source software (orange) is most often gratis but not always. Freeware (green) seldom expose their source codes.

The U.S. Department of Defense (DoD) defines "open source software" (i.e., free software or free and open-source software), as distinct from "freeware" or "shareware"; it is software where "the Government does not have access to the original source code". The "free" in "freeware" refers to the price of the software, which is typically proprietary and distributed without source code. By contrast, the "free" in "free software" refers to freedoms granted users under the software license (for example, to run the program for any purpose, modify and redistribute the program to others), and such software may be sold at a price.

According to the Free Software Foundation (FSF), "freeware" is a loosely defined category and it has no clear accepted definition, although FSF asks that free software (libre; unrestricted and with source code available) should not be called freeware. In contrast the Oxford English Dictionary simply characterizes freeware as being "available free of charge (sometimes with the suggestion that users should make a donation to the provider)".

Some freeware products are released alongside paid versions that either have more features or less restrictive licensing terms. This approach is known as freemium ("free" + "premium"), since the "free" version is intended as a promotion for the premium version. The two often share a code base, using a compiler flag to determine which is produced. For example, BBEdit has a BBEdit Lite edition which has fewer features. XnView is available free of charge for personal use but must be licensed for commercial use. The "free" version may be advertising supported, as was the case with the DivX.

Ad-supported software and registerware also bear resemblances to freeware. Ad-supported software does not ask for payment for a license, but displays advertising to either cover development costs or as a means of income. Registerware forces the user to subscribe with the publisher before being able to use the product. While commercial products may require registration to ensure licensed use, registerware do not.

Shareware permits redistribution, but the license only allows limited use before paying the license fee. Some features may be disabled prior to payment, in which case it is sometimes known as crippleware.

Both freeware and shareware sometimes have a limited evaluation period, after which the software is automatically disabled or starts displaying a request to pay a registration fee. In the latter case it is colloquially known as nagware.

=== Creative Commons licenses ===
The Creative Commons offer licenses, applicable to all by copyright governed works including software, which allow a developer to define "freeware" in a legal safe and internationally law domains respecting way. The typical freeware use case "share" can be further refined with Creative Commons restriction clauses like non-commerciality (CC BY-NC) or no-derivatives (CC BY-ND), see description of licenses. There are several usage examples, for instance The White Chamber, Mari0 or Assault Cube, all freeware by being CC BY-NC-SA licensed with only non-commercial sharing allowed.

== Restrictions ==
Freeware cannot economically rely on commercial promotion. In May 2015 advertising freeware on Google AdWords was restricted to "authoritative source"[s]. Thus web sites and blogs are the primary resource for information on which freeware is available, useful, and is not malware. However, there are also many computer magazines or newspapers that provide ratings for freeware and include compact discs or other storage media containing freeware. Freeware is also often bundled with other products such as digital cameras or scanners.

Freeware has been criticized as "unsustainable" because it requires a single entity to be responsible for updating and enhancing the product, which is then given away without charge. Other freeware projects are simply released as one-off programs with no promise or expectation of further development. These may include source code, as does free software, so that users can make any required or desired changes themselves, but this code remains subject to the license of the compiled executable and does not constitute free software.

== "Free" trial ==
A "free" trial is another related concept in which customers are allowed to use a product, free of charge, for a limited time.

When a software monopoly has a strong network effect, it may be more profitable for it to offer a "free" trial. Also, customers acquired via a "free" trial have a much lower customer lifetime value as opposed to regular customers, but they also respond more to marketing communications.

Some factors that may encourage or discourage people to use "free" trials include:

- perceived usefulness
- perceived ease of use
- perceived risk

A potential customer may also use a free trial if they receive a forced free trial of a publication they didn't request.

== See also ==
- List of freeware
- List of freeware video games
- List of commercial video games released as freeware
- Freely redistributable software
- Gratis versus Libre
- Comparison of user features of messaging platforms
