= Comedy College =

American entertainment programme

Comedy College was an entertainment programme produced by Minnesota Public Radio and distributed by American Public Media. The show premiered October 6, 2001 on MPR and online at comedycollege.net. The half-hour show featured excerpts from radio and concert recordings of comedy routines, with commentary by the hosts. Each show was dedicated to a specific comedian or team of comedians.

The show's main host was Steve Martin; other hosts were Rita Rudner, Bob Newhart, and Lily Tomlin. Garrison Keillor was executive producer, and Tiffany Hanssen producer. Comedians featured in the show's run included Lenny Bruce, Bill Cosby, Mike Nichols and Elaine May.
