= Radio comedy =

Genre of radio programming

Radio comedy, or comedic radio programming, is a radio broadcast that may involve variety show, sitcom elements, sketches, and various types of comedy found in other media. It may also include more surreal or fantastic elements, as these can be conveyed on a small budget with just a few sound effects or some simple dialogue. Radio comedy began in the United States in 1930, based on the fact that as most United Kingdom music hall comedians such as Charlie Chaplin and Stan Laurel progressed to silent films, they moved to Hollywood and fed the radio comedy field. Another British music hall comic, George Formby, stayed in the British movie industry, and in 1940 joined the Entertainments National Service Association to entertain British World War II troops. UK radio comedy therefore started later, in the 1950s.

== Background and history ==
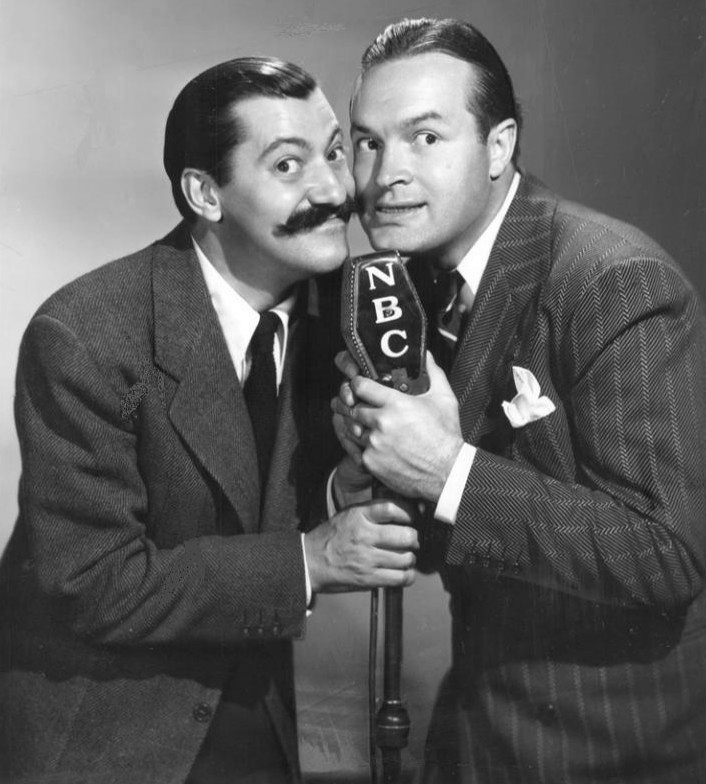
Jerry Colonna and Bob Hope on Hope's NBC radio program, 1940.

Radio comedy began in the United States in 1930, and got a much later start in the United Kingdom because many of the British comedians (such as Charlie Chaplin and Stan Laurel) emigrated to the U.S. to make silent movies in Hollywood, and the American comedians who did not become dramatic actors migrated to radio. Raymond Knight launched The Cuckoo Hour on NBC in 1930, along with the 1931 network debut of Stoopnagle and Budd on CBS. Comedians such as Fred Allen, Jack Benny, Judy Canova, Bob Hope and Red Skelton were top-rated in the decades that followed. Even after the big name comedians moved to television in the 1950s, radio comedy continued, notably from Bob and Ray (1946–1988), The Firesign Theatre (1966–1972), and segments heard on NBC's Monitor (1955–1975).

Radio comedy did not begin in the United Kingdom until a generation later, with such popular 1950s shows as The Goon Show (started 1951) and Hancock's Half Hour (started 1957). Later, radio became a proving-ground for many later United Kingdom comedians. Chris Morris began his career in 1986 at Radio Cambridgeshire, and Ricky Gervais began his comedy career in 1997 at London radio station XFM.

Although traditional comedy was once a significant part of American broadcast radio programming, it is now mainly found in the archives of Old Time Radio enthusiasts and on the Internet streaming of comedy recordings. The majority of mainstream radio comedy now consists of personality-driven shows hosted by talk-radio hosts such as Howard Stern or comedic duos such as Armstrong & Getty and Bob & Tom. Exceptions to this are WSRN's "Audience of Two", Garrison Keillor's work on Minnesota Public Radio: A Prairie Home Companion and Comedy College, and NPR's Car Talk, a comedy show thinly disguised as car advice, and Wait Wait... Don't Tell Me!. Shows featuring comedic music are also popular; one of the better known national comedy music programs is the long-running weekly program hosted by Dr. Demento, and several other local stations (mostly college radio, freeform and eclectic formats) have similar programs. Several networks program 24 hours a day of stand-up comedy routines; several channels on the Sirius XM Radio platforms focus on this format, as does the terrestrial All Comedy Radio network. Rock music stations often play bits of stand-up comedy within the bounds of their regular formats, usually under the banner of a "five o'clock funnies" feature.

In Britain and Canada, however, the BBC and Canadian Broadcasting Corporation respectively have continued making new radio comedy and drama. British radio comedy also has a home on Australia's Radio National and in Ireland there are always a few comedy shows in the week's programming on RTÉ. A locally produced Australian comedic radio program is Hamish & Andy, and in the United Kingdom an example was The Burkiss Way.

Radio in Canada is fragmented between the public broadcasters the CBC and Radio Canada in English and French respectively, and a number of independent stations and syndicated networks spread across a very large country. Canadian radio licences are federally managed to limit monopolies. Consequently, programing including comedy, is inconsistent and variable quality. In Toronto Jake Edwards (radio personality) portrayed a punchdrunk boxer known as the Champ who manages to misunderstand social situations and overreact with fisticuffs. Performing musical comedians Maclean and Maclean created foul-mouthed original recordings which became underground hits despite limited airplay due to censorship and legal troubles. The Ottawa market on CHEZ-FM 106.1 featured a pair of Ottawa Valley "lads" or country bumpkins Delmer MacGregor and Cecil Wiggins, played by Gary Perrin and Mike O’Reilly. In real life Perrin was a station executive with little performance training. O'Reilly was an on-air personality, a seasoned bluegrass musician, and multi-instrumentalist. Together they produced a light comedy album, which included Meadow Muffin Blues about stepping in cow pies in the pasture.

Many of the BBC's most successful television comedies began life as BBC Radio 4 shows. These include Hancock's Half Hour, Goodness Gracious Me, Knowing Me, Knowing You, The League of Gentlemen, Whose Line Is It Anyway?, Room 101, Have I Got News For You, (based on Radio 4's The News Quiz), Dead Ringers, Mitchell and Webb and The Mighty Boosh, and more recently Little Britain and Absolute Power. The science fiction comedy Red Dwarf was developed from ideas in a radio show called Son Of Cliché. Another science fiction comedy The Hitchhiker's Guide to the Galaxy was created for radio, but also went on to great success in book, television and film formats.

Examples of American radio comedy can be heard on streaming internet radio stations. Humorous storytelling is the focus of The Moth Radio Hour. Garrison Keillor's A Prairie Home Companion can be heard on public radio stations in the United States and a different version of the shows can be heard on BBC Radio 4 Extra and RTÉ under the name Garrison Keillor's Radio Show. Old shows can be listened to online at the websites of "A Prairie Home Companion" or RTÉ. British radio comedy can be heard on BBC Radio 4, BBC Radio 2 and BBC Radio 4 Extra. Minnesota Public Radio maintains a website where it is possible to listen to episodes of Comedy College. A British commercial station Oneword broadcast American vintage radio comedy as part of their 24-hour-a-day programming of books, comedy and drama and this was streamed on the internet until the station closed in 2008.

Interest in radio comedy and radio drama is currently enjoying a resurgence. Epguides.com, which provides encyclopedic information on television shows, has recently begun to build a similar list of radio shows.

In America, new groups have formed to try to bring about a renewed interest in the art-form. At the forefront of this new wave of audio-only comedic groups is Peeper Radio Theatre. Veteran NPR Producer Joe Bevilacqua is creating new radio comedy for The Comedy-O-Rama Hour, which airs on XM Satellite Radio's Sonic Theater Channel 163, five times per week. In the UK, recent standup and revue comedy performances are also now receiving airing on radio.

== See also ==
- Books on the radio
- List of old-time radio people
- List of radio comedies
