= Account verification =

Process of verifying ownership of a website account

Account verification is the process of verifying that a new or existing account is owned and operated by a specified real individual or organization. A number of websites, for example social media websites, offer account verification services. Verified accounts are often visually distinguished by check mark icons or badges next to the names of individuals or organizations.

Account verification can enhance the quality of online services, mitigating sockpuppetry, bots, trolling, spam, vandalism, fake news, disinformation and election interference.

== History ==
Twitter used a blue icon to mark verified accounts, from 2009 to 2022. In November 2022 the icon was changed to instead mark paid X Premium subscribers.

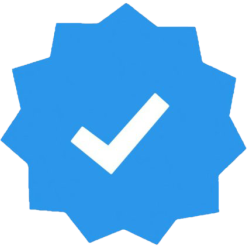
Instagram verified badge

Account verification was introduced by Twitter in June 2009, initially as a feature for public figures and accounts of interest, individuals in "music, acting, fashion, government, politics, religion, journalism, media, sports, business and other key interest areas". A similar verification system was adopted by Google+ in 2011, Facebook page in October 2015 (Available in United States, Canada, United Kingdom, Australia and New Zealand) Facebook profile and Facebook page in 2018 (Available in Worldwide) Instagram in 2014, and Pinterest in 2015. On YouTube, users are able to submit a request for a verification badge once they obtain 100,000 or more subscribers. It also has an "official artist" badge for musicians and bands.

In July 2016, Twitter announced that, beyond public figures, any individual would be able to apply for account verification. This was temporarily suspended in February 2018, following a backlash over the verification of one of the organisers of the far-right Unite the Right rally due to a perception that verification conveys "credibility" or "importance". In March 2018, during a live-stream on Periscope, Jack Dorsey, co-founder and CEO of Twitter, discussed the idea of allowing any individual to get a verified account. Twitter reopened account verification applications in May 2021 after revamping their account verification criteria. This time offering notability criteria for the account categories of government, companies, brands, and organizations, news organizations and journalists, entertainment, sports and activists, organizers, and other influential individuals. Instagram began allowing users to request verification in August 2018.

In April 2018, Mark Zuckerberg, co-founder and CEO of Facebook, announced that purchasers of political or issue-based advertisements would be required to verify their identities and locations. He also indicated that Facebook would require individuals who manage large pages to be verified. In May 2018, Kent Walker, senior vice president of Google, announced that, in the United States, purchasers of political-leaning advertisements would need to verify their identities.

Gold badge used for Verified Organizations Twitter subscribers

Gray badge used for government accounts on Twitter

In November 2022, Elon Musk included a blue verification check mark with a paid Twitter Blue monthly membership. Prior to Musk's acquisition of Twitter, Twitter offered this check mark at no charge to confirmed high profile users. On December 19, 2022, Twitter introduced two new check mark colors: gold for accounts from official businesses and organizations, and grey for accounts from governments or multilateral organizations. The type of check mark can be confirmed by visiting the profile page, then clicking or tapping on the check mark.

== Techniques ==
=== Identity verification services ===
Identity verification services are third-party solutions which can be used to ensure that a person provides information which is associated with the identity of a real person. Such services may verify the authenticity of identity documents such as drivers licenses or passports, called documentary verification, or may verify identity information against authoritative sources such as credit bureaus or government data, called nondocumentary verification.

=== Identity documents verification ===
The uploading of scanned or photographed identity documents is a practice in use, for example, at Facebook. According to Facebook, there are two reasons that a person would be asked to send a scan of or photograph of an ID to Facebook: to show account ownership and to confirm their name.

In January 2018, Facebook purchased Confirm.io, a startup that was advancing technologies to verify the authenticity of identification documentation.

=== Behavioral verification ===
Behavioral verification is the computer-aided and automated detection and of behaviors to verify accounts. Behavioral verification is used extensively on social media platforms for a variety of reasons:

- Behavioral verification is used to detect unauthorized alternate accounts
- Behavioral verification is used to detect unauthorized automated accounts, also known as bots. Bot detection falls into three categories: crowdsourced human annotation, supervised classification from behavioral features, and network-based methods.
- Behavioral verification is used to identify disinformation in the form of fake news and/or election interference.
- Behavioral verification is used to detect disruptive users, including trolls, spammers, and/or vandals.

Behavioral verification processes can flag accounts as suspicious, exonerate accounts, or offer corroborating evidence for account verification.

=== Bank account verification ===
Identity verification is required to establish bank accounts and other financial accounts in many jurisdictions. Verifying identity in the financial sector is often required by regulation such as Know Your Customer or Customer Identification Program. Accordingly, bank accounts can be of use as corroborating evidence when performing account verification.

Bank account information can be provided when creating or verifying an account or when making a purchase.

=== Postal address verification ===
Postal address information can be provided when creating or verifying an account or when making and subsequently shipping a purchase. A hyperlink or code can be sent to a user by mail, recipients entering it on a website verifying their postal address.

=== Telephone number verification ===
A telephone number can be provided when creating or verifying an account or added to an account to obtain a set of features. During the process of verifying a telephone number, a confirmation code is sent to a phone number specified by a user, for example in an SMS message sent to a mobile phone. As the user receives the code sent, they can enter it on the website to confirm their receipt.

=== Email verification ===
An email account is often required to create an account. During this process, a confirmation hyperlink is sent in an email message to an email address specified by a person. The email recipient is instructed in the email message to navigate to the provided confirmation hyperlink if and only if they are the person creating an account. The act of navigating to the hyperlink confirms receipt of the email by the person.

The added value of an email account for purposes of account verification depends upon the process of account verification performed by the specific email service provider.

=== Multi-factor verification ===
Multi-factor account verification is account verification which simultaneously utilizes a number of techniques.

=== Multi-party verification ===
The processes of account verification utilized by multiple service providers can corroborate one another. OpenID Connect includes a user information protocol which can be used to link multiple accounts, corroborating user information.

== Account verification and good standing ==
On some services, account verification is synonymous with good standing.

Twitter reserves the right to remove account verification from users' accounts at any time without notice. Reasons for removal may reflect behaviors on and off Twitter and include: promoting hate and/or violence against, or directly attacking or threatening other people on the basis of race, ethnicity, national origin, sexual orientation, gender, gender identity, religious affiliation, age, disability, or disease; supporting organizations or individuals that promote the above; inciting or engaging in the harassment of others; violence and dangerous behavior; directly or indirectly threatening or encouraging any form of physical violence against an individual or any group of people, including threatening or promoting terrorism; violent, gruesome, shocking, or disturbing imagery; self-harm, suicide; and engaging in other activity on Twitter that violates the Twitter Rules.

In April 2023, Blue ticks were removed from all Twitter accounts that had not subscribed to Twitter Blue.

== See also ==
- Digital identity – Information used by computer systems to represent an external agent
- Electronic authentication – Process of establishing confidence in user identity
- Federated identity – Identity assurance in IT systems
- Identity assurance – Trust level of digital identity credentials
- Identity management – Systems to give users appropriate access
- User profile – Data about an individual user
- Online identity – Social identity in an online community
- Persona (user experience) – Personalized fictional characters representing a consumer or user category
- Personal data – Information that identifies a person
- Real-name system – Authentication with one's real name
- Social media optimization – Form of optimization
- Social profiling – Process of constructing a social media user's profile using his or her social data
