= Technoself studies =

Human identity in a technological society

Technoself studies, commonly referred to as TSS, is an interdisciplinary domain of research dealing with human identity in a technological society pioneered by Rocci Luppicini. It focuses on the changing nature of relationships between humans and technology. The term "Technoself" aims to avoid ideological or philosophical biases inherent in other related terms including cyborg, posthuman, transhuman, techno-human, beman (also known as bio-electric human), digital identity, avatar, and homotechnicus, even though these categories "capture important aspects of human identity". Technoself is further elaborated and explored in Luppicini's "Handbook of Research on Technoself: Identity in a Technological Environment".

== History and contextual framing ==
Technoself evolved from early groundwork in identity studies, philosophy of mind, and cognitive science. René Descartes is often credited as one of the first identity theorists to question the material world and the certainty of knowledge from the self. Despite heavy criticism, the question he posed regarding the necessary relation between the mind and body is still considered an important theme in contemporary discussions of identity and technology. Another major development in identity studies came from early social psychology, sociology and psychoanalysis. Beginning with Freud, the psychoanalytic tradition helped to explain the dynamics of identity and personality development. Erving Goffman's dramaturgical theory contributed to identity theory by emphasizing the centrality of the social realm and the notion of self-presentation to identity. Later, Foucault also contributed to the field by contemplating how technologies could facilitate the emergence of new ways of relating to oneself.

The most salient area of Technoself studies revolves around ontological considerations and conceptualizations of the technoself. The identification of the essence of human beings is frequent in philosophical circles and is a very common feature within emerging theoretical scholarship on technoself. DeGrazia's (2005) examination on identity/numerical identity shed light on the ethics of human enhancement. According to DeGrazia, human identity is divided into two parts: Firstly, human identity is composed of numerical identity which concerns the continuity of an individual as the same object over time or across procedure. Secondly, human identity involves a narrative identity which concerns the changes in self-perception experienced by an individual over time. By dividing human identity into two parts, DeGrazia facilitates a discussion on the ethics of human enhancements. Meanwhile, Croon Fors'(2012) research on the entanglement of the self and digitalization have helped frame ontological considerations related to the conceptualization of technoself studies.

A common theme within technoself studies is the dynamic nature of identity. Questions related to this topic include how advances in sensing technologies, biometrics, and genetics are changing the way we define and recognize identity or how technologies are changing the way people define themselves and present themselves in society.

Another important subject of investigation in TSS is the conception of the self in relation to the increasing reliance on the use of technologies (such as cellphones, tablets, and social media) in peoples' personal and professional lives. New technologies, particularly computer-mediated communication tools, highlight questions related to identity in relationship to privacy issues, virtual identity boundaries, online fraud, citizen surveillance, etc. According to John Lester, in the future, "we won't simply enjoy using our tools, we will come to care for them".

== Related terms ==
=== Noeme ===
The Noeme is a term coined in 2011 by biogerontologist Marios Kyriazis, and it denotes a "combination of a distinct physical brain function and that of an outsourced virtual one". A Noeme is the intellectual "networked presence" of an individual within the global brain, a meaningful harmony between each individual human, their social interactions and artificial agents, globally connected to other "noemes" through digital communications technology. Kyriazis further clarifies that:

...The noeme is structurally coupled with its medium, i.e. the computer/internet. It continuously generates its own organisation and specifies its operation and content. As a self-organising system it adjusts to external influences and reinvents itself in order to adapt to its environment i.e. it reproduces (self-replicates) horizontally in a process that can be termed 'noemic reproduction'. This digital intellectual manifestation of a person, if successful, will lead to others copying it, thus noemes are replicating... A noeme is not just a collection of single ideas or solitary intellectual achievements. It is the total sum of all individual cognitive efforts and active information-sharing accomplishments of a person, the intellectual standing of a person within the Global brain.

=== Cyborg ===
A cyborg (cybernetic organism) is a term referring to individuals with "both biological and artificial parts." Cyborgs are known as being half-human, half machine organisms, due to the fact that they are always connected with technology. This term, which was coined in 1960 by Manfred Clynes, refers to and acknowledges those beings whose abilities have been enhanced due to the presence and advancement of technology. The notion of cyborg has played a part in breaking down boundaries between humans and non-humans living within a technologically advanced society. For example, those who have installed pacemakers, hearing aids, artificial body parts, cochlear implants as well as other technologies that may aid in enhancing an organism's abilities and capacities to perform, either physically or mentally. Hugh Herr, an American rock climber, engineer, and biophysicist, has successfully invented the next generation of cyborg (bionic limbs and robotic prosthetics). As the head of the Media Lab's Biomechatronic group in MIT, he shared his experience and presented the team achievement first time in a TED talk show.

=== Transhuman ===
Transhuman is a concept that emerged as a result of the transhumanist movement which is centered around the notion of improving the abilities of human beings mainly through both 'scientific and technical means. Unlike the posthuman concept, the notion of transhuman is based on human augmentation but does not commit itself to positing a new separate species. The philosophy of transhumanism was developed in the 1990s by British philosopher Max More who articulated the principles of transhumanism as a futurist philosophy. Transhuman philosophy has been subject to scrutiny by prominent scholars such as Francis Fukuyama.

=== Posthuman ===
Posthuman is a concept that aims towards signifying and characterizing a fresh and enhanced type of being. This organism is highly representative of a being that embraces drastic capabilities that exceeds current human capabilities that are presently defining human beings. This posthuman state of identity has mainly resulted from the advancement of technological presence. According to Luppicini, posthuman capabilities "suggest a new type of being over and above human. This compromises the neutrality needed for a clear conception of human identity in the face of human-technological integration." This concept aims towards enabling a brighter future concerned with gaining a better perception of the world through various viewpoints.

=== Homotechnicus ===
Homotechnicus is a term used by Jose Galvin in 2003 to help refine the definition of human beings to more accurately reflect the evolving condition of humans intertwined within advancing technological society". It refers to the notion that humans are technological by nature and evolve simultaneously with technology. Galvin states in his article titled "On Techno ethics", "mankind cannot do away with the technical dimension, going even to the point of considering this part of its constitution: mankind is technical by nature. Technology is not an addition to man but is, in fact, one of the ways in which mankind distinguishes itself from animals." Luppicini builds upon the concept of homotechnicus in his book Handbook of Research on Technoself: Identity in a Technological Society. Luppicini feels that the notion of homotechnicus contributes to the conception of humans as techno selves in two ways. First it helps to solidify the idea of technology as being a key component in defining humans and society and secondly it demonstrates the importance of technology as a human creation that aligns with human values. He further goes on to explain that human interactions with the material world around them helps to create meaning and this unique way of creating meaning has affected how humans have evolved as a species.

The term "homotechnicus" was coined earlier than 2003. It was used by Russell E. Willis in his 1990 PhD dissertation for Emory University: Toward a Theological Ethics of Technology: An analysis in Dialogue with Jacques Ellul, James Gustafson, and the Philosophy of Technology. It was again used by Willis in his 1997 publication, "Complex Responsibility in an Age of Technology," in Living Responsibly in Community, ed. Fredrick E. Glennon, et al. (University Press of America, 1997): 251ff. In both publications homotechnicus is offered as a model for the responsible self in an age of pervasive technology.

=== Avatar ===
Avatars represent the individual, the individual's alter ego, or character(s) within virtual environments controlled by a human user. Avatars provide a unique opportunity to experiment with one's identity construction within virtual worlds (Turkle, 1995) and to do so with others". Examples of avatars can include personas in online games or virtual life simulations such as Second Life.

=== Techno-Human ===
A new hybrid form of creature that results from an intertwinement between human and machine.

=== Techno-sapien ===
A techno-sapien would be a slang term for a human being who is familiar and comfortable with technology. Someone who has the latest gadgets and electronic machinery would be techno-sapien.

=== Digital identity ===
Digital identity is the data that uniquely describes a person or a thing and contains information about the subject's relationships. The social identity that an internet user establishes through digital identities in cyberspace is referred to as online identity.

== Key areas and issues ==
The areas of focus in TSS are: philosophical inquiry and theoretical framing, digital identity and virtual life, human enhancement technologies, and their regulation. These areas of study have been influenced by extensive research, the input from an editorial advisory and review board over the course of several years.

=== Digital identity and virtual life ===
Digital identity and virtual life looks at how individuals explore, develop and represent their identities in online, virtual, or mediated environments. Research on virtual life and digital identities is concerned not only with how individuals relate to their own mediated identities, but also with how they relate to those of others. With the current popularity of social networking service sites, it is no surprise that TSS scholars have also begun studying the effects that such constant and mediated social connections have on identity. Topics that fall under this category have included intellectual disability, gender identity, and mass media in sport.

Critical areas of research include: how individuals treat the identity of others in an online space; how people use media to develop and project their identity; and how digital representation can alter life meaning and identity (Luppicini, 2013). Such research examines the advantages and disadvantages of online life and digital identity construction.

Areas of digital identity and virtual life have become quite popular, e.g. online avatars. Scholars are now focused on the role avatars play in identity exploration, priming behaviors, and self-presentation. Other research looks at the use of communication technologies by immigrant individuals as part of a digital diaspora. These scholars examine a trend in which diasporic immigrants who feel disconnected from their cultural identities have turned to digital technologies as a way to reconnect.

The term "technoself" is often used interchangeably with "virtual self". In this case, technoself is used to refer to a virtual manifestation of one's self. The ability to project one's self into a virtual world allows users to control their appearance and personality. Users are able to customize their virtual identity and craft a persona to their liking. The malleability of online identities allows users to not only create their own virtual self, but also to continually change and mold their online selves in ways impossible to do with their real identities. Users can edit and change their virtual selves' appearance and behavior to control other users' perception of them.

The ability to create and change your identity in this way is due to anonymity. Anonymity is a paramount and dynamic feature of virtual social interaction within the online public sphere. As individuals are not required to reveal their real identity, they are able to explore new and undiscovered aspects of themselves. In this expansion of the self, anonymous individuals may try on various identities which break traditional social norms, without fear of retribution or judgment. This contributes to the creation of 'super-selves', through which individuals may amplify aspects of their projected identities in order to form an ideal expression of the self. The fact that the vast majority of virtual encounters are anonymous in nature allows a 'strangers on a train' phenomenon to take place. Through invented and unknown persona, individuals are able to engage in self-disclosure, transvestism, and fantasies. However, this freedom may not be absolute, as there are many risks in participating in an online community, including identity theft and the potential linkage between anonymous and manifest identities. Anonymity also may have legal ramifications, making it difficult for law enforcement to maintain control over online communities. Tracking down online law-breakers is difficult when their identity is unknown. Anonymity also frees individuals so that they are able to behave in socially undesirable and harmful ways, which can result in forms of hate speech and cruel online behaviour. Lastly, anonymity also diminishes the integrity of information, and as a result, diminished the overall trust of online environment.

Many online users choose to attempt anonymity through the use of avatars. Users associate themselves with avatars as digital representatives within a duplicated and simulated virtual community. The user's body is essentially plugged in within the avatar world, thereby creating the illusion of infinite "space" behind the computer screen. As a result, they provide the opportunity for users to manipulate their worlds and the spaces and objects with which they interact. Participation in online communities has resulted in the creation of a virtual economy based on the semantic value of digital products. This form of online consumerism is centered on the creation of avatars as extensions of the self. The purchase of symbolic goods for these avatars relates to the emotional and social value that the user holds for these items. These products may indicate roles or personality traits of players within a community and consist primarily of task oriented and nonfunctional items.

Luppicini argues that the rise of online life creates serious questions on the advantages and disadvantages of online communities along with the challenges to online identity construction (Turkle, 1999). He notes the negative influence of the impersonality of virtual communities on offline interaction and the consequence of Internet addiction. Sherry Turkle states: "We discovered the network – the world of connectivity – to be uniquely suited to the overworked and overscheduled life it makes possible. And now we look to the network to defend us against loneliness even as we want it to control the intensity of our connections".

=== Privacy and surveillance of the technoself ===
Computer networking and smart technologies such as radio frequency identification (RFID), geographical information systems (GIS), and global positioning systems (GPS) are providing new tools and techniques for monitoring individuals and their behavior. The rise in these types of technologies has raised concerns over the invasion of privacy, and the misuse of information. That is because the networked identity of technoselves can be exploited by third parties who may want to gain access and control over personal information. Moreover, the implications of the sophisticated technologies for identifying and tracking people, the storage of this data, and the governmental use of surveillance to track suspicious types of people are significant issues in privacy/surveillance and TSS. The availability of related technologies (e.g. Eye Tap, Memoto) to individuals (as opposed to governments or commercial interests) has also led to the phenomenon dubbed sousveillance, where individuals track or record authorities' activities either online or in real environments.

Leading scholars in the study of surveillance include David Lyon and Mark Andrejevic. In addition to contributing to the advent of citizen journalism, the proliferation of sousveillance technologies has suggested a number of legal/regulatory, ethical, and social implications for democratic and consumer rights. A dramatic illustration of these concerns comes from University of Toronto Professor Steve Mann, a privacy rights advocate and pioneering engineer of such technologies. After being allegedly assaulted in a French McDonald's restaurant for wearing an augmented-reality digital eye glass device, Mann was, ironically, allegedly denied access to McDonald's own surveillance camera footage. This led to Mann's coinage of the term "McVeillance" for instances of surveillance/sousveillance double standards and to his contribution the proposal of the Mann-Wassell law in the New York legislature.

=== Human enhancement technology ===
Human enhancement technology (HET) is the study of tools that would better and improve a human being's way of life. It seeks to advance and progress what humans already do within their normal lives. However, customarily it seeks to aid any illnesses and weaknesses in the body. Popular topics within this new area of study include, sex reassignment surgery, mood enhancers, genomics, and neuroenhancement. Enhancement within the workplace is a new topic of discussion, while the workplace should be adapting to the various types of human impairment, it seems that improving the workers is of more concern to corporations. Through the use of cyborg prosthetics one can assemble themselves in their own vision, any disfigurement or handicap can possibly disappear. Within the evolution of cyborg prosthetics a human is able to physically grasp things more easily, allowing more of the population to engage in whatever they choose. A large aspect of this technology stems from the ability to determine who may and may not benefit, as well as how access to these new technologies should be controlled.

Human bodies can now not only be improved upon through natural means, but through the effects of technology. This new form of enhancement is connected with what humans perceive of themselves, and as to how their own identity is created. A human operates based on their abilities; these capabilities are the factors and characteristics that create a personality. The augmentation of these aptitudes leads to a new human, who has a renewed sense of who they are. The term 'free to be me' is closely related to this new form of enhancement, where in technological enhancements can be either cosmetic or reconstructive. Through the incorporation of medicine and technology "...cosmetic surgery then becomes a technology through which the body is normalized and homogenized as much as enhanced". A proper example relating to human enhancement and cyborgs could be the recently convicted Oscar Pistorius. In past years, Pistorius fought with the International Olympic Committee to have a place in the hurdles events of the 2012 Olympics in London. The controversy surrounding Pistorius extended to his artificial legs, and how they compared to the natural human anatomy; did Pistorius have an unfair advantage over his competitors? The ruling was left up to a scientific analysis of his legs and running stride which ultimately led to his participation in the Olympic Games. Therefore, we have come to a time where decisions, and thus human panels, need to determine what is human, what is natural, and what is artificial.

Rights and privacy issues over human enhancement technology has given rise to challenging topics within technoself studies. For instance, the consideration of ethical policies and guidelines in the deployment of HET is an emerging topic within TSS. Furthermore, the question of access to HET, and where we draw the line between necessary therapeutic technologies, and frivolous human enhancement are being raised in TSS. Therefore, the emerging topic regarding the rights and privacy over HET is of great interest within TSS. Popular HET's topics in recent research academia include: Sex (re assignment) (Diamond & Sigmundson, 1997; Zucker, 2002), mood enhancers (Rabin, 2006), cognitive enhancers (Walker, 2008), genomics (Zwart, 2009), and neuroenhancement (Northoff,1996). A second line of inquiry explores social, legal, and ethical aspects of human enhancement and possible threats to human dignity that could arise from the implementation of human enhancements (Bostrom, 2005).

Some critiques engage a discussion between the development of HET and the socio-economic environment. Francis Fukuyama, an American political scientist concerns about the future of HET might cause the extension of contradiction between the rich and poor within comparatively rich, industrialized nations because HET is likely to be a luxury product. At the moment, HET seems to be hard to be mainstream in public health services due to the price, which creates a deeper distinctions among those who can afford the technology and those who will remain disabled.

=== Transhumanism ===
Transhuman thought focuses on beliefs held that the fundamental transformation of the human condition will be through the development of various technology, which will eventually eliminate human aging and will enhance human capacities, both physical and mental. Believers in this theory think that the future of human development will see a new intelligent species that will be enhanced by the technological advances. They use these technological advances to approach various issues regarding the human experience, like morality and health issues. They see this convergence happening through the support of current technologies and the vision of technology in the future; using these advances to eventually make humans more than human, enhanced through this technology. Their central argument is that humans need to be able to choose whether or not this technology is used by them or not.

This theory expands on the notion of technoself, as transhumanism poses what to many who hold these beliefs is the natural evolution of the human condition. Many look to the history of technological advancements as proof that these future advancements are possible, at least in theory.

=== Real and virtual identities ===
Avatars are a visual representation of a user in an online environment. This representation may be an accurate physical representation of the user, or may be completely different. This online representation may affect the offline self. Pena and his colleagues explored a phenomenon known as the "Proteus effect" where in "avatars can prime negative attitudes and cognition in desktop virtual settings". They conducted a study that demonstrated how the appearance and affiliations of an individual's online avatar can alter the individual's offscreen personality and attitudes. Pena's group used virtual group discussions to gauge the aggressiveness of individuals using avatars wearing black cloaks versus their control group counterparts wearing white and found more aggressive intentions and attitudes in the black cloak group.

Similar results were found in a second study that used Thematic Apperception Test studies to determine the differences between values and attitudes of a control group and a group using a Ku Klux Klan (KKK)-associated avatar. Individuals using the KKK-associated avatars were less affiliative and displayed more negative thoughts than the control group. Further support for Pena et al.'s work can be found in other studies that yielded similar results: "Yee and Bailenson found that, in an immersive 3D environment, participants using avatars with more attractive faces walked closer and disclosed more information when compared to those using avatars with less attractive faces. In addition...participants using taller avatars tended to negotiate more forcefully in comparison to those using shorter avatars." A growing body of evidence supports how our online personas can affect our offline self; altering our attitudes and values.

=== Online anonymity and presentation of the self ===
Online anonymity is commonly described using the phrase "On the Internet, nobody knows you're a dog". Online anonymity allows users to present different versions of themselves in online environments. Unconstrained by physical limitations, users are free to choose and construct their virtual form(s) and identities. Virtual spaces which foster such freedom and anonymity therefore allow users to depart from the expectations, norms, and behaviors of their daily lives. It can be said that this unlimited freedom of anonymous expression allows for the transfer of real world suppressed emotions to the online domain. However, if one continually chooses to express their true self anonymously online as opposed to in the real world via face to face interaction, which realm would be more 'real'? As extreme as this scenario may seem, one could say the suppression of norms and natural expression would deem the physical self the avatar, and the online avatar the true self.

A user's online identity is a social identity that represents the user in the online environment, allowing a user a high level of control over their identity in a way that differs from the offline world. Turkle found that the level of control over creating an online identity also extends to the intensity of connections made in such virtual spaces, as users may engage and disengage at will. Dervin and Abbas note that Turkle, in her early work was "one of the first to show how anonymity 'provides ample room for individuals to express unexplored parts of themselves' more easily than in face-to-face interaction". Within this notion of being free in online anonymity, technoself studies also looks at what the element of hiding does to us. Turkle suggests that, "our networked life allows us to hide from each other, even as we are tethered to each other". Technoself studies explores what these profiles do to the human unconscious. While people are "exposing" themselves, they question their level of exposure and sharing compared to extent in what they are truly hiding in reality. Furthermore, when creating online profiles, people risk others' perceptions of the information shared and if they receive the messages that the sender intended. Without verbal communication misperceptions, messages can alter identity or personal development.

Avatars can be an important element of the online presentation of the user. In many cases, "avatars in blogging were created to accurately reflect their owners' physical appearance, lifestyle and preferences. By contrast, participants in the dating and gaming treatments accentuated certain aspects of their avatar to reflect the tone and perceived expectations of the context". In other words, individuals often emphasize or downplay certain characteristics depending upon the context of their online interactions. These inconsistencies tend to be trivial, however. For instance, men tend to mildly exaggerate their height, while women often underestimate their weight. This is typically not an attempt to mislead others but to be as honest as possible while still presenting themselves in the best light.

According to Vasalou & Joinson, although various online forums may present people with the opportunity to create (an) alternate persona(s), they typically choose to create an avatar or represent themselves in a way that is consistent with reality: "In having equal access to everyday artifacts and fantasy options, participants were inclined to draw on existing self-views rather than grasping the opportunity to explore other personas". Furthermore, Vasalou and Joinson also claim that, in the context of online communication, high self-awareness (as demonstrated by an avatar largely consistent with an individual's offline persona), contributes to a higher rate of interpersonal communication.

One consequence of online anonymity and creating false identities is the ability to "catfish". Catfishing is a recent internet phenomenon, of manipulating, deceiving and luring people into relationships, through creating an online fictional persona. In many cases these deceptions are used to create romantic or intimate affairs. Since the affair happens entirely through technology, one is able to hide their true identity and carry on the relationship through their made up character. The majority of these incidents happen through social media sites, such as Facebook, and internet dating sites where people are already looking for love, and hence can be easily manipulated by peoples personas and deceptions.

== New directions and opportunities in research ==
=== Personalized robots and social integration of artificial creatures ===
New directions and opportunities in technoself research involving personalized robots and social integration of artificial creatures is becoming an increasing reality. Considering the work of pioneering computer scientists and robotics experts such a Rodney Brooks and Hiroshi Ishiguro, human interaction with personal and social robots reached mainstream audiences beginning with the popularization of robotic dolls and pets for children. Research by Sherry Turkle examines many of the effects of these social robots on children, middle and elderly. There are also robots for adults aimed at therapeutic (techno therapy), personal, and social applications (Paro Phobot, Roxxxy, etc.). These types of therapeutic robots are used in nursing homes and hospitals, with the purpose of creating an environment where one can nurture and communicate with an animal. This allows people in a lonely or isolated environment the ability to have something to care for and interact with that is also able to respond and interact back. This has shown to provide happiness and a larger sense of purpose for the individuals, even if for a short period of time. With personalized robots and the social integration of artificial intelligence, technoself is developing in children through relationships with robotic pets and related robotic technologies based on animals, objects, or people (Tamagotchi, Furby, AIBO, etc.). Current areas of interest in this topic are reported in Melson (2012), which provide helpful insights into children's views about robot pets, children's relationship with robotic pets and, conceptualizations of self-identity within child-robot relationships. Other research is focusing more on personalized robots for adults. If the trend towards the personalization of robots and social integration of artificial creatures continues, it is expected that this research will become more prevalent. David Levy, the artificial intelligence researcher in University of Maastricht contains the forecast of robot and human relationship in his thesis, "Intimate Relationships with Artificial Partners". In his interview Forecast: Sex and Marriage with Robots by 2050 with LiveScience, Levy says :"My forecast is that around 2050, the state of Massachusetts will be the first jurisdiction to legalize marriages with robots". are real life experience suggesting that humans can develop a psychological level relationship with artificial subjects, even if the subject itself is not in any physical shape. Judith Newman wrote an article on New York Times about the relationship between the Siri system and her 13-year-old son who has autism. Newman says his son develops a close relationship with the system and learning to show affection to it even though he knows Siri is not 'real'. Newman suggest that Siri could be a potential companion to those children who have a hard time to communicate with people. Duggan (2016) describes how users already form relationships with technology that share many of the features of relationships between humans. These relationships have important implications for the future of healthcare as interactive technology increasingly replaces roles traditionally filled by humans.

=== Human enhancement regulation and governance ===
Human enhancement regulation, governance, and legal concerns has become another growing concern for the opportunity of TSS research. According to Saner and Geelen (2012), there is one framework to guide technoself governance which distinguishes six different approaches to which emerging technologies may affect human identity:

1. physical alteration of existing human beings
2. changes to how existing human bodies are perceived
3. the creation of novel humanoid bodies
4. physical alteration of existing human environments
5. changes to the way humans perceive existing human environments
6. creation of novel human environments.

Luppicini posits that this sort of model could "prove invaluable for guiding future decision making directed at the framing of HET regulation debates, as well as leveraging strategic planning and decision making concerning HET adaption standards." Technoethics relates to the ethical considerations concerning technology in society. Human enhancement improves aspects of human function and may temporarily or permanently overcome the limitations of the human body through natural or artificial means. The consequences of such technological alterations implies ethical questions such as the unfair physical and mental categorization of certain individuals. Therefore, further consideration will need to be associated with ethical questions surrounding the evolution of technology. With growing trends of artificial intelligence and technological devices, such as Google Glass, stricter regulation will be necessary. Furthermore, Elon Musk recently stated that "We need to be careful with AI (artificial intelligence). Potentially more dangerous than nukes", meaning that there may be need to worry about the evolution of technology, and specifically how humans employ it to their benefit.

== See also ==
- Technology and society
- Online identity
- Identity formation

== Sources ==
- Luppicini, R. (2013). The Emerging Field of Technoself Studies. Handbook of Research on Technoself: Identity in a Technological Society. Hershey, PA: Information Science Reference. ISBN 9781466622128.
