= ShowScoop =

American review-aggregation website

- Website type: Live music reviews
- Available in: English
- Founder: Micah Smurthwaite
- Website: www.showscoop.com
- Registration: Free
- Launched: August 2012
- Current status: Active

ShowScoop is a website and mobile app platform on which users can rate and review artists, concerts, and music festivals that they have seen/attended. The reviews and ratings are designed to be informative of how well such performances are live. This helps concert-goers decide which live music events they want to attend.

== History ==
ShowScoop was founded in August 2012 by Micah Smurthwaite and is based out of San Diego, CA. In February 2013, ShowScoop launched its mobile app at the SF Music Tech Summit. The application is currently available on the iPhone, with plans to expand into the Android market in the future.

== Services ==
ShowScoop uses crowdsourcing to provide accurate ratings of live concert experiences. In addition to viewing ratings, users are encouraged to rate and review concerts they have attended. The ShowScoop database includes nearly one million artists and over 2.5 million live music events.

ShowScoop users can rate artists on four aspects of the performance: stage presence, crowd interaction, sound quality, and visual effects. The rating system uses an ascending scale from one to five in each of the aspects, with five being the highest score.

In addition to the quantitative ratings, ShowScoop users are also free to write qualitative reviews in a provided comment section. This allows users to explain their ratings and add further insight or opinion.

ShowScoop incorporates several facets of social media into its services. Users can create a user profile to share limited personal information and store their ratings and reviews. Users are also given the option of sharing their evaluations with their social networks on Facebook and Twitter. Users can "like" reviews, follow artists, and follow other ShowScoop users.

The mobile app allows users to take photos, apply filters, and share the final image in conjunction with reviews and through Instagram.

== Road Crew ==
ShowScoop's "Road Crew" is a group made up of top contributors within the ShowScoop community. The Road Crew assists in curating artist pages, assuring information quality and accuracy. In return, members of the Road Crew are given incentives, including free tickets to concerts and personal invitations to exclusive shows.

Applicants to the Road Crew are judged on the number and quality of their reviews, the photos and videos they have posted, and their general engagement with the ShowScoop community in following and liking users and reviews.
