= Digital ID =

A Digital ID can refer to:

- a Digital identity, the digital representation of a subject, or the set of claims made by one digital subject about itself or another digital subject,

or

- a Public key certificate, also known as a Digital Certificate or a Digital identity certificate, an electronic document which uses a digital signature to bind together a public key with an identity.
