= Persona (user experience) =

Personalized fictional characters representing a consumer or user category

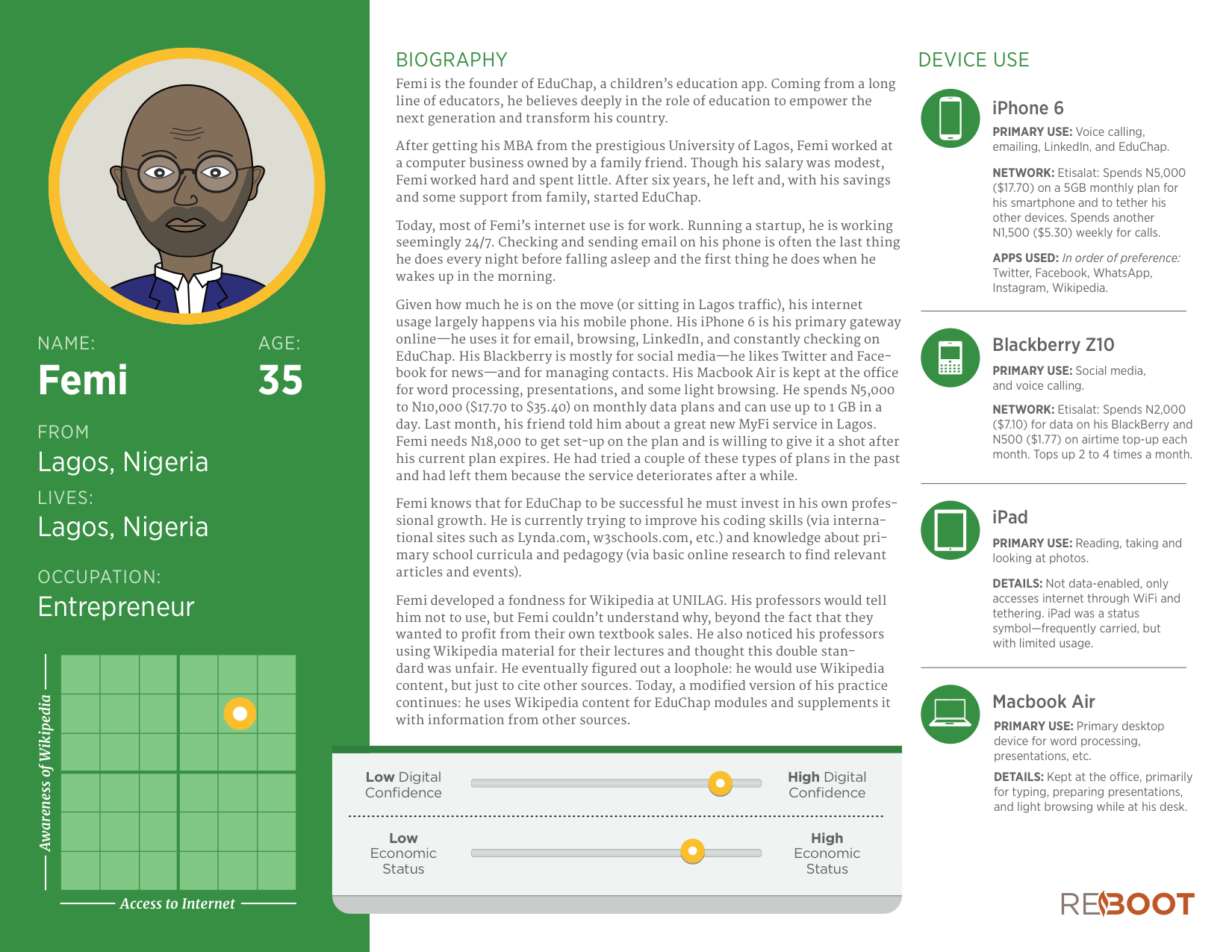
Here, the illustration person called Femi is a persona used online.

A persona (also user persona, user personality, customer persona, buyer persona) in user-centered design and marketing is a semi-fictional characterization or representation of a typical customer segment or end user. Personas help marketers and designers focus their efforts by humanizing data into relatable profiles. Personas are one of the outcomes of market segmentation, where marketers use the results of statistical analysis and qualitative observations to draw profiles, giving them names and personalities to paint a picture of a person that could exist in real life. The term persona is used widely in online and technology applications as well as in advertising, where other terms such as pen portraits may also be used.

Personas are useful in considering the goals, desires, and limitations of brand buyers and users in order to help to guide decisions about a service, product or interaction space such as features, interactions, and visual design of a website. Personas may be used as a tool during the user-centered design process for designing software. They can introduce interaction design principles to things like industrial design and online marketing.

A user persona is a representation of the goals and behavior of a hypothesized group of users. In most cases, personas are synthesized from data collected from interviews or surveys with users. They are captured in short page descriptions that include behavioral patterns, goals, skills, attitudes, with a few fictional personal details to make the persona a realistic character. In addition to Human-Computer Interaction (HCI), personas are also widely used in sales, advertising, marketing and system design. Personas provide common behaviors, outlooks, and potential objections of people matching a given persona.

== History ==
Within software design, Alan Cooper, a noted pioneer software developer, proposed the concept of a user persona. Beginning in 1983, he started using a prototype of what the persona would become using data from informal interviews with seven to eight users. From 1995, he became engaged with how a specific rather than generalized user would use and interface with the software. The technique was popularized for the online business and technology community in his 1999 book The Inmates are Running the Asylum. In this book, Cooper outlines the general characteristics, uses and best practices for creating personas, recommending that software be designed for single archetypal users.

The concept of understanding customer segments as communities with coherent identity was developed in 1993-4 by Angus Jenkinson and internationally adopted by OgilvyOne with clients using the name CustomerPrints as "day-in-the-life archetype descriptions". Creating imaginal or fictional characters to represent these customer segments or communities followed. Jenkinson's approach was to describe an imaginal character in their real interface, behavior and attitudes with the brand, and the idea was initially realized with Michael Jacobs in a series of studies. In 1997 the Ogilvy global knowledge management system, Truffles, described the concept as follows: "Each strong brand has a tribe of people who share affinity with the brand's values. This universe typically divides into a number of different communities within which there are the same or very similar buying behaviours, and whose personality and characteristics towards the brand (product or service) can be understood in terms of common values, attitudes and assumptions. CustomerPrints are descriptions that capture the living essence of these distinct groups of customers."

== Benefits and features ==
According to Pruitt and Adlin, the use of personas offers several benefits in product development. Personas are said to be cognitively compelling because they put a personal human face on otherwise abstract data about customers. By thinking about the needs of a fictional persona, designers may be better able to infer what a real person might need. Such inference may assist with brainstorming, use case specification, and features definition. Pruitt and Adlin argue personas are easy to communicate to engineering teams and thus allow engineers, developers, and others to absorb customer data in a palatable format. They present several examples of personas used for purposes of communication in various development projects.

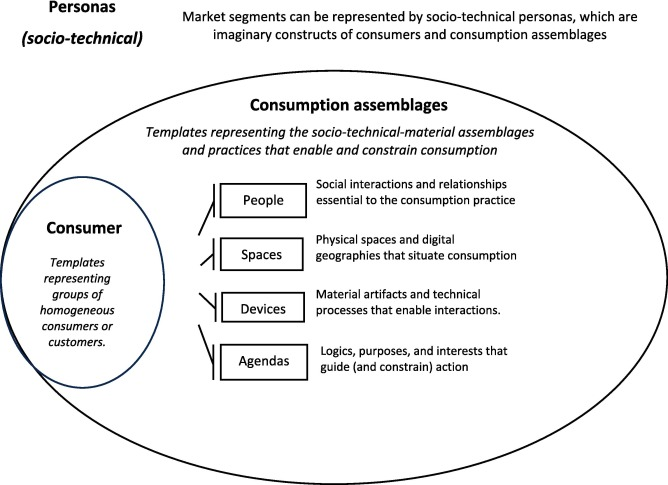
Market segments can be represented by socio-technical personas, which are imaginary representations of consumers and consumption practices.

Personas also help prevent some common design pitfalls. The first is designing for what Cooper calls "The Elastic User", by which he means that while making product decisions different stakeholders may define the 'user' according to their convenience. Defining personas helps the team have a shared understanding of the real users in terms of their goals, capabilities, and contexts. Personas help prevent "self-referential design" when the designer or developer may unconsciously project their own mental models on the product design which may be very different from that of the target user population. Personas also provide a reality check by helping designers keep the focus of the design on cases that are most likely to be encountered for the target users and not on edge cases which usually will not happen for the target population. According to Cooper, edge cases which should naturally be handled properly should not become the design focus.

The persona benefits are summarized as follows:

- Shared Understanding: Help team members develop a consistent view of target audience groups, making data more relatable through coherent stories.
- Guided Design Decisions: Allow teams to prioritize features based on how well they meet the needs of specific personas.
- Empathy Building: Provide a human face to data, fostering empathy for users represented by the personas.
- Focused Design: Prevent designers from making self-referential decisions by keeping the focus on user needs.

While features will vary based on project needs, all personas will capture the essence of an actual potential user.

Common features include:

- Fake name and profile picture
- Basic demographics (age, race, gender, education, marital status, preferred language, etc.)
- Biography containing personal interests, professional goals, and any other relevant information designers should know
- A summarizing quote
- Technology use
- Disabilities, accessibility needs, or challenges
- Opinions and beliefs

== Criticism ==
Criticism of personas falls into three general categories: analysis of the underlying logic, concerns about practical implementation, and empirical results.

In terms of scientific logic, it has been argued that because personas are fictional, they have no clear relationship to real customer data and therefore cannot be considered scientific. Chapman and Milham described the purported flaws in considering personas as a scientific research method. They argued that there is no procedure to work reliably from given data to specific personas, and thus such a process is not subject to the scientific method of reproducible research.

Other critics argue that personas can be reductive or stereotypic, leading to a false sense of confidence in an organization's knowledge about its users. Critics like Steve Portigal argue that personas' "appeal comes from the seduction of a sanitized form of reality," where customer data is continuously reduced and abstracted until it is nothing more than a stereotype. Critics claim that persona creation puts the onus on designers, marketers, and user researchers to capture multiple peoples' opinions and views into predefined segments, which could introduce personal bias into the interpretation.

Additionally, personas often feature gendered and racial depictions, which some argue is unnecessary and distracts the target audience of the personas from true consumer behaviors and only enhances biased viewpoints. Finally, it is worth acknowledging that proto-personas and personas are often generalized as the same resource, however, proto-personas are a generative tool used to identify a team's assumptions about their target users. Personas, on the other hand, should be rooted in customer data and research, and be used as a way to coalesce insights about particular segments.

== Scientific research ==
In empirical results, research to date has offered soft metrics for the success of personas, such as anecdotal feedback from stakeholders. Rönkkö has described how team politics and other organizational issues led to limitations of the personas method in a set of projects. Chapman, Love, Milham, Elrif, and Alford have demonstrated with survey data that descriptions with more than a few attributes (e.g., such as a persona) are likely to describe very few if any real people. They argued that personas cannot be assumed to be descriptive of actual customers.

A study conducted by Long (2009) assessed the effectiveness of personas in design education. The study found that students who used personas produced designs with better usability attributes and reported improved communication within design teams. In a partially controlled study, a group of students were asked to solve a design brief; two groups used personas while one group did not. The students who used personas were awarded higher course evaluations than the group who did not. Students who used personas were assessed as having produced designs with better usability attributes than students who did not use personas. The study also suggests that using personas may improve communication between design teams and facilitate user-focused design discussion. The study had several limitations: outcomes were assessed by a professor and students who were not blind to the hypothesis, students were assigned to groups in a non-random fashion, the findings were not replicated, and other contributing factors or expectation effects (e.g., the Hawthorne effect or Pygmalion effect) were not controlled for.

Ayoola et al. (2024) found that user personas have an impact on the prioritization of social sustainability for software developers, by discouraging the selection or prioritization of "anti-social" features.

== Data-driven personas ==
Data-driven personas (sometimes also called quantitative personas) have been suggested by McGinn and Kotamraju. These personas are claimed to address the shortcomings of qualitative persona generation (see Criticism). Academic scholars have proposed several methods for data-driven persona development, such as clustering, factor analysis, principal component analysis, latent semantic analysis, and non-negative matrix factorization. These methods generally take numerical input data, reduce its dimensionality, and output higher level abstractions (e.g., clusters, components, factors) that describe the patterns in the data. These patterns are typically interpreted as "skeletal" personas, and enriched with personified information (e.g., name, portrait picture). Quantitative personas can also be enriched with qualitative insights to generate mixed method personas (also called hybrid personas).

== See also ==
- Behavioral targeting
- Dave and Sue
- Digital identity
- Online identity
- Online identity management
- Personalization
- Personalized marketing
- Personal information
- Personal identity
- Scenario (computing)
- Social profiling
- Use case
- User profile

== Bibliography ==
- Grudin, J; Pruitt, J (June 2002). Personas, participatory design and product development: an infrastructure for engagement (PDF). Participatory Design Conference. Malmo, Sweden.
- Nielsen, Lene (2014), "Personas", in Soegaard, Mads; Dam, Rikke Friis (eds.), The Encyclopedia of Human-Computer Interaction (2nd ed.), Aarhus, Denmark: The Interaction Design Foundation, ISBN 978-87-92964-00-7
