= Personal branding =

Marketing a person's career and professional traits

Personal branding is a strategic process aimed at creating, positioning, and maintaining a positive public perception of oneself by leveraging unique individual characteristics and presenting a differentiated narrative to a target audience. The concept is rooted in two main theoretical foundations: marketing theory and self-presentation behaviours. Personal branding is often framed in marketing terms such as 'product,' 'added value,' and 'promise,' highlighting its parallels with product branding and its focus on distinctiveness and market positioning. Conversely, definitions of self-presentation focus on personal identity, reputation, and managing one's image, underscoring how people present themselves to influence how others perceive them. Success in personal branding is viewed as the result of effective self-packaging. It is more about self-promotion rather than authentic self-expression. The distinction between the two lies in the fact that self-promotion is deliberate in every regard, as the person is consciously crafting their image or persona. In contrast, self-expression can sometimes unintentionally arise from promotion.

== History ==
The idea of positioning a personal or professional identity appeared in the 1981 book Positioning: The Battle for Your Mind, by Al Ries and Jack Trout. More specifically in Chapter 20 - "Positioning Yourself and Your Career" - that one can benefit by using positioning strategy to advance one's career.

Business writer Tom Peters is credited as coining the phrase "personal branding" as part of his "Brand You" philosophy, introduced in his 1999 book The Brand You 50, which expanded on his original 1997 article, "The Brand Called You".

In their 2003 book Be Your Own Brand, marketers David McNally and Karl Speak describe a personal brand as "a perception or emotion, maintained by somebody other than you, that describes the total experience of having a relationship with you".

== Public perception ==
A personal brand is a widely recognized, consistent perception or impression of an individual based on their experience, expertise, competencies, actions and/or achievements within a community, industry, or the marketplace at large. Some individuals link their personal names or pseudonyms with their businesses as seen with current President of the United States and businessman Donald Trump, who uses his name on properties and enterprises like Trump Tower. Celebrities may also leverage their social status to support organizations for financial or social gain. For example, Kim Kardashian endorses brands and products through her media influence.

The relationship between brands and consumers is dynamic and must be constantly refined. This continuous process demonstrates the ambivalence of consumerism.

== Approaches to personal brand management ==
Personal branding has gained significance due to the use of the Internet, as social media and online identities affect the physical world. Effective personal branding involves highlighting one's knowledge, experience, and skills to establish a credible image. Authenticity, professionalism, and responsiveness are crucial traits when communicating online, as they create trust and consistency. Maintaining a consistent portrayal across both professional and personal platforms reinforces a coherent brand image, while unprofessional behaviour on any social media platform can harm career prospects. Individuals maintain a unified brand by avoiding conflicting portrayals, and where necessary, separating personal and professional social media identities helps maintain privacy.

== Social media and personal branding ==
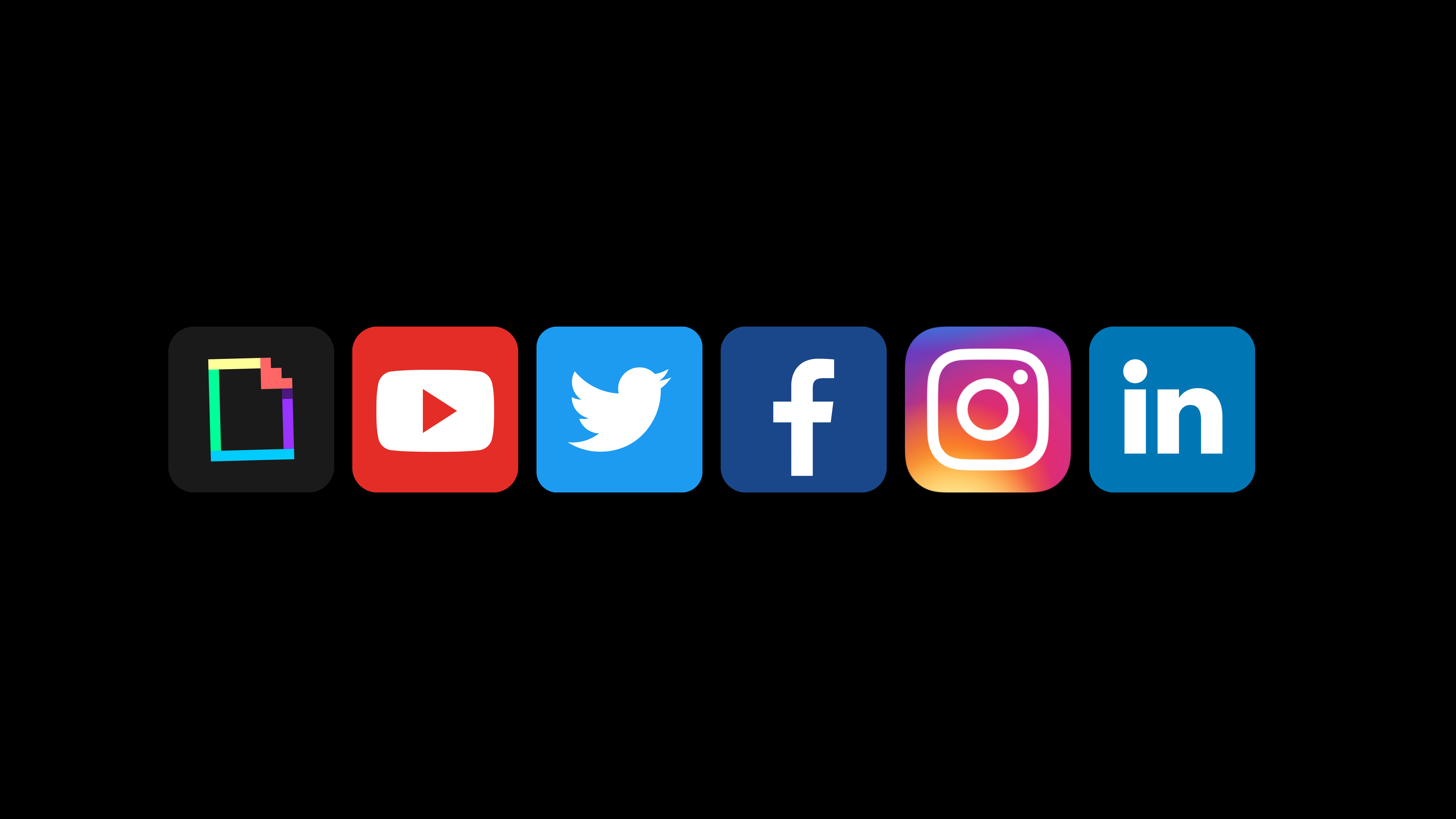
Social media channels

With the rise of social media, managing a personal brand has become more accessible. Platforms like Facebook, Twitter, Instagram, personal blogs, are used to build and maintain a brand consistency across all mediums, which ensures effective brand management. Establishing a target audience and focusing on an area of specialization helps maintain and preserve the brand. Creating original content engages the audience and staying informed within one's field builds expertise. Publishing content across various channels helps individuals gain recognition and followers and staying relevant keeps the audience engaged by reinforcing one's position as an expert.

== Influence of personal branding on careers ==
General professional profiles like LinkedIn and company or industry-specific networks, such as Slack, allow a person to improve their self-branding, specifically in finding a job or improving one's professional standing.

Employers are increasingly using social media tools to vet applicants before offering them interviews. Practices include searching an applicant's history on sites such as Facebook and Twitter, and conducting background checks using search engines and other tools. To effectively promote a personal brand, individuals should focus on presenting a comprehensive professional profile. Hence along with a standout resume that highlights skills and accomplishments, a customized cover letter, references, an elevator speech, and a LinkedIn profile showcasing expertise need to be included. Additionally, maintaining a professional presence on social media platforms like Facebook and Twitter, and linking these to a personal website with relevant content, strengthens one's overall brand image and visibility.

According to Alberto Chinchilla Abadías "it is advisable for the company to train its workers and managers in communication and digital skills in order to effectively use these technologies".

Building a brand and an online presence within internal corporate networks allows individuals to connect with their colleagues, not only socially but also professionally. This kind of interaction allows for employees to build up their personal brand relative to other employees, as well as spur innovation within the company as more people can learn from one another.

Some social media sites, like Twitter, can have a flattened, all-encompassing audience that can be composed of professional and personal contacts, which then can be seen as a more "'professional' environment with potential professional costs". Because of its explicitly public nature, Twitter becomes a double-sided platform that can be utilized in different ways depending on the amount of censorship a user decides on.

== Social influence ==
Aside from professional aspirations, personal branding can also be used on personal-level social networks to flare popularity. The online self is used as a marketing and promotional tool to brand an individual as a type of person; success on the virtual platforms then becomes "online social value [that could transform] to real rewards in the offline world." When branding themselves on social media three factors are considered: "crafting physical footprint, creating digital footprint, and communicating the message." A prominent example of a self-made self-branded social media icon is Tila Tequila, who rose to prominence in 2006 on the Myspace network, gaining more than 1.5 million friends, through expertly marketing her personal brand.

As social media has become a vehicle for self-branding, these moguls have begun to situate the maintenance of their online brand as a job, which brings about new ways to think about work and labour. The logic of online sites and the presence of feedback means that one's online presence is viewed by others using the same rubric to judge brands: evaluation, ranking, and judgment. Thus, social media network sites serve as complex, technologically mediated venues for the branding of the self.

== Role of visual identity ==
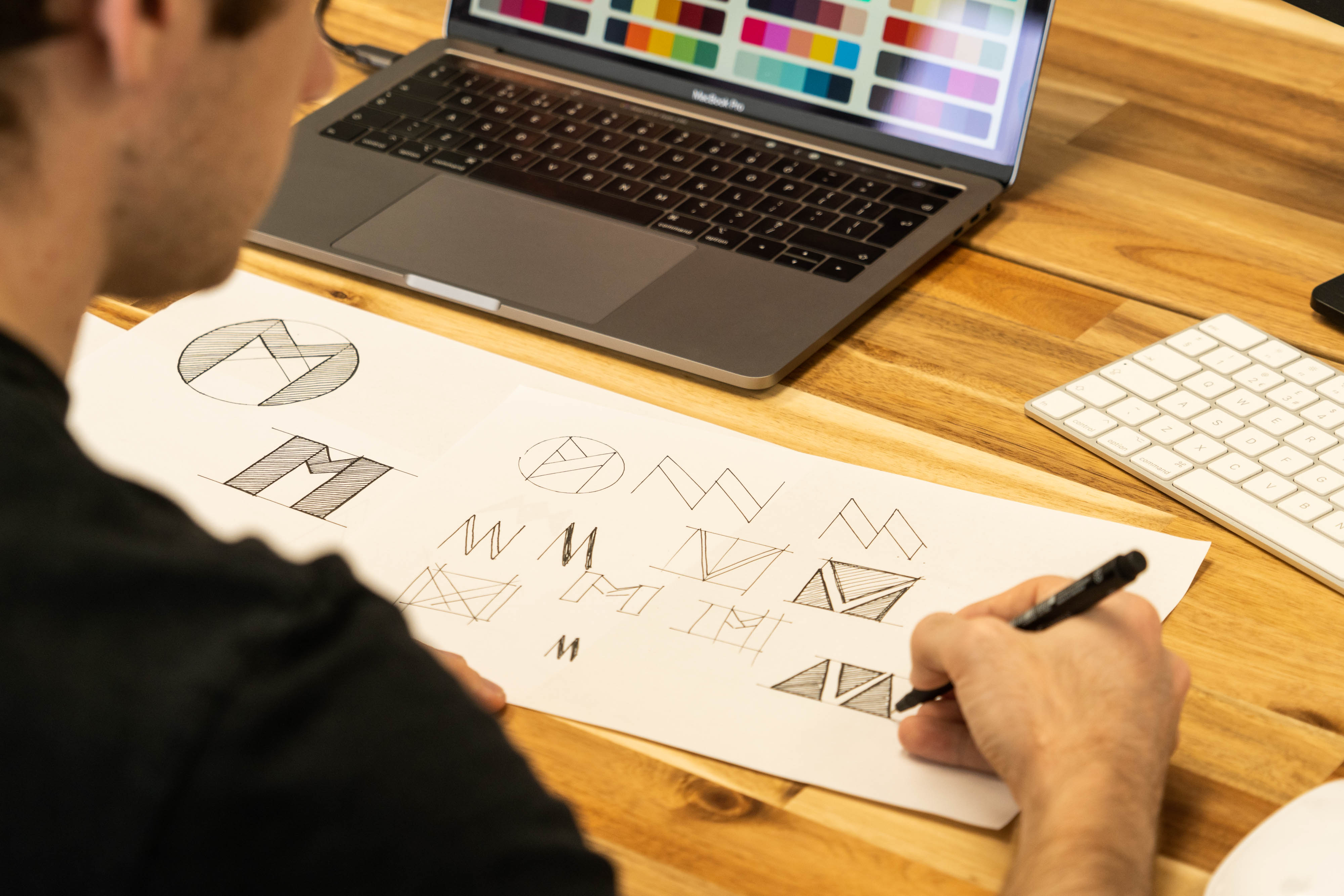
Visual identity design

Visual identity can be an essential part of personal branding as it shapes how individuals are perceived and remembered. The visual representation of a brand, including elements like colour schemes and typography, has the power to evoke specific emotions and influence perceptions. Consistent visual identity, through images and graphics, creates brand differentiation and recognition. Thoughtful photography and cohesive designs strengthen visual identity, making a brand more relatable and trustworthy. This cohesive presentation supports brand consistency, loyalty, and relatability.

== Disclosure ==
Personal branding involves the practice of self-disclosure, and this transparency is part of what Foucault would call "the proper care of the self". In this sense, disclosure refers to the details of one's everyday life for other's consumption, while transparency is the effect of this kind of disclosure. Transparency essentially works to give viewers a complete view of one's authentic self.

Digitally aided disclosure, which involves building a self-brand on a social network site, relies on traditional discourses of the authentic self as one that is transparent, without artifice, and open to others. Authenticity is viewed as both residing inside the self and is also demonstrated by allowing the outside world access to one's inner self. It is interesting to think about the idea of authenticity with disclosure, and the freedom social networks allow in disclosing an inauthentic self. All the while, these postings are forming a digital archive of the self through which a brand could be crafted by others.

== Criticisms ==
Personal branding has been widely promoted as a tool for achieving professional success. Numerous self-help books, programs, personal coaches, and articles emphasize the importance of crafting an individual brand, often framed around ideas of authenticity and personal fulfilment. Proponents suggest that these strategies help individuals highlight their strengths and differentiate themselves in competitive environments.

However, critics argue that personal branding contributes to the commodification of the self. In this view, individuals are treated as products, with their identities marketed and consumed similarly to commercial goods. This perspective suggests that efforts to express authenticity may paradoxically become artificial, as the presentation of the self is shaped by audience expectations and platform logic.

While personal branding can enhance visibility and help employers assess a candidate's skills and cultural fit, it may also create pressure to conform to specific norms or engage in performative behaviour. Scholars have pointed to the tension between expressing a genuine self and tailoring that expression for strategic advantage. The use of social media further complicates this dynamic, as profiles, blogs, and personal websites form part of a public-facing portfolio that can be interpreted and evaluated by others.

== Related ideas ==
=== Goffman's self-presentation theory ===
Erving Goffman's self-presentation theory explores how individuals seek to control the impressions others form of them. The theory introduces the concepts of front stage and back stage to distinguish between public and private behaviours. In the context of personal branding, front stage refers to the curated presentation of the self, which is often seen on social media platforms where individuals actively shape how they are perceived by others. Public figures, including celebrities and athletes, commonly use these platforms to cultivate a consistent and strategic personal image.

The backstage, in contrast, encompasses behaviours or attitudes that are concealed from public view. Disclosures that occur outside the intended brand image may contradict the curated persona and potentially harm public perception. Public controversies resulting from private comments made public, such as the case of former Los Angeles Clippers owner Donald Sterling, illustrate how unfiltered backstage behaviour can conflict with and damage a carefully managed personal brand.

Through Goffman's framework, personal branding can be interpreted as a form of performance in which individuals selectively share content to reinforce a desired identity. This process is amplified in digital environments. Audiences often evaluate online personas in ways similar to how they assess commercial brands, focusing on visibility, consistency, and perceived authenticity.

== See also ==
- Creative disruption
- Dandy
- Dog and pony show
- Identity performance
- Influence-for-hire
- Impression management
- Online identity management
- Reputation capital
- Reputation management
