= Online identity =

Social identity in an online community

Internet identity (IID), also online identity, online personality, online persona or internet persona, is a social identity that an Internet user establishes in online communities and websites. It may also be an actively constructed presentation of oneself. Although some people choose to use their real names online, some Internet users prefer to be anonymous, identifying themselves by means of pseudonyms, which reveal varying amounts of personally identifiable information. An online identity may even be determined by a user's relationship to a certain social group they are a part of online. Some can be deceptive about their identity.

In some online contexts, including Internet forums, online chats, and massively multiplayer online role-playing games (MMORPGs), users can represent themselves visually by choosing an avatar, an icon-sized graphic image. Avatars are one way users express their online identity. Through interaction with other users, an established online identity acquires a reputation, which enables other users to decide whether the identity is worthy of trust. Online identities are associated with users through authentication, which typically requires registration and logging in. Some websites also use the user's IP address or tracking cookies to identify users.

The concept of the self, and how this is influenced by emerging technologies, are a subject of research in fields such as education, psychology, and sociology. The online disinhibition effect is a notable example, referring to a concept of unwise and uninhibited behavior on the Internet, arising as a result of anonymity and audience gratification.

== Online social identity ==
=== Identity expression and identity exposure ===
The social web, i.e. the usage of the web to support the social process, represents a space in which people have the possibility to express and expose their identity in a social context. For example, people define their identity explicitly by creating user profiles in social network services such as Facebook or LinkedIn and online dating services. By expressing opinions on blogs and other social media, they define more tacit identities.

Online identity is shaped not only by individual choice but also by platform-specific affordances that influence self-presentation. Design features such as profile templates, visibility settings, and feedback mechanisms encourage particular forms of expression while constraining others. Users may therefore adapt how they present themselves to align with platform norms or perceived audience expectations. These affordances affect which aspects of identity become visible, persistent, or searchable. As a result, online identity emerges through an interaction between users, technological systems, and social contexts. This highlights the socio-technical nature of identity formation in digital environments.

The disclosure of a person's identity may present certain issues related to privacy. Many people adopt strategies that help them control the disclosure of their personal information online. Some strategies require users to invest considerable effort.

The emergence of the concept of online identity has raised many questions among academics. Social networking services and online avatars have complicated the concept of identity. Academia has responded to these emerging trends by establishing domains of scholarly research such as technoself studies, which focuses on all aspects of human identity in technological societies.

Online activities may affect our offline personal identity, as well. Avi Marciano has coined the term "VirtuReal" to resolve the contested relationship between online and offline environments in relation to identity formation. Studying online usage patterns of transgender people, he suggested that the internet can be used as preliminary, complementary, and/or alternative sphere. He concludes that although "the offline world sets boundaries that potentially limit the latitude within the online world, these boundaries are wide enough to allow mediated agency that empowers transgender users. Consequently, the term VirtuReal "reflects both the fact that it provides an empowering virtual experience that compensates for offline social inferiority, and the fact that it is nevertheless subject to offline restrictions".

=== Concept of the mask ===
Dorian Wiszniewski and Richard Coyne, in their contribution to the book Building Virtual Communities, explore online identity, with emphasis on the concept of "masking" identity. They say that whenever an individual interacts in a social sphere, they portray a mask of their identity. This is no different online and becomes even more pronounced due to the decisions an online contributor makes concerning their online profile. They must answer specific questions about age, gender, address, username, and so forth. With the accrual of one's online activity, their mask is increasingly defined by their style of writing, vocabulary, and topics.

The kind of mask one chooses reveals something about the subject behind the mask, which might be referred to as the "metaphor" of the mask. The online mask does not reveal the actual identity of a person; it reveals an example of what lies behind the mask. If a person chooses to act like a rock star online, this metaphor reveals an interest in rock music but may also indicate a lack of self-esteem. A person may also choose to craft a fake identity, whether entirely fictional, already in existence, borrowed, or stolen.

Because of many emotional and psychological dynamics, people can be reluctant to interact online. By evoking a mask of identity, a person can create a safety net. An anonymous or fake identity is one precaution people take so that their true identity is not stolen or abused. By making the mask available, people can interact with some degree of confidence without fear.

Wiszniewski and Coyne state, "Education can be seen as the change process by which identity is realized, how one finds one's place. Education implicates the transformation of identity. Education, among other things, is a process of building up a sense of identity, generalized as a process of edification." Students interacting in an online community must reveal something about themselves and have others respond to this contribution. In this manner, the mask is constantly being formulated in dialogue with others and thereby students will gain a richer and deeper sense of who they are. There will be a process of edification that will help students come to understand their strengths and weaknesses.

==== Blended identity ====
The blended mask perspective is likened to the concept of 'blended identity', whereby the offline-self informs the creation of a new online-self, which in turn informs the offline-self through further interaction with those the individual first met online. It means people's self-identity varies in different social or cultural contexts.

== In different contexts ==
=== Blogging ===
As blogs allow an individual to express their views in individual essays or as part of a wider discussion, it creates a public forum for expressing ideas. Bloggers often choose to use pseudonyms, whether in platforms such as WordPress or in interest-centered blog sites, to protect personal information and allow them more editorial freedom to express ideas that might be unpopular with their family, employers, etc. Use of a pseudonym (and a judicious approach to revealing personal information) can allow a person to protect their real identities, but still build a reputation online using the assumed name.

=== Human resources ===
Digital identity management has become a necessity when applying for jobs while working for a company. Social media has been a tool for human resources for years. A KPMG report on social media in human resources say that 76 percent of American companies used LinkedIn for recruiting. The ease of search means that reputation management will become more vital especially in professional services such as lawyers, doctors and accountants.

=== Social networks ===
Online social networks like Facebook and MySpace allow people to maintain an online identity with some overlap between online and real-world context. These identities are often created to reflect a specific aspect or ideal version of themselves. Representations include pictures, communications with other 'friends' and membership in network groups. Privacy control settings on social networks are also part of social networking identity.

Some users may use their online identity as an extension of their physical selves, and center their profiles around realistic details. These users value continuity in their identity, and would prefer being honest with the portrayal of themselves. However, there is also a group of social network users that would argue against using a real identity online. These users have experimented with online identity, and ultimately what they have found is that it is possible to create an alternate identity through the usage of such social networks. For example, a popular blogger on medium.com writes under the name of Kel Campbell – a name that was chosen by her, not given to her. She states that when she was verbally attacked online by another user, she was able to protect herself from the sting of the insult by taking it as Kel, rather than her true self. Kel became a shield of sorts, and acted as a mask that freed the real user beneath it.

Research from scientists such as danah boyd and Knut Lundby has found that in some cultures, the ability to form an identity online is considered a sacred privilege. This is because having an online identity allows the user to accomplish things that otherwise are impossible to do in real life. These cultures believe that the self has become a subjective concept on the online spaces; by logging onto their profiles, users are essentially freed from the prison of a physical body and can "create a narrative of the self in virtual space that may be entirely new".

=== Online business ===
In the development of social networks, the act doing business via social networks became possible. For example, there are many users of WeChat called wei-businessmen, who sell products on WeChat. The identities of users in social networks are not inherently the same as that in the real world, thus for the sake of security, people may mistrust someone in social networks, in particular when relating with money. Therefore, for wei-businessmen, reputation is very important for wei-business. Once customers decide to shop via Wechat, they prefer to choose those wei-businessmen with high reputations. They may need to invest efforts to gain reputations among the users of WeChat to increase the chance other users will purchase from them.

=== Online learning ===
==== Communication ====
Online identity in classrooms forces people to reevaluate their concepts of classroom environments. With the invention of online classes, classrooms have changed and no longer have the traditional face-to-face communications. These communications have been replaced by computer screen. Students are no longer defined by visual characteristics unless they make them known. There are pros and cons to each side. In a traditional classroom, students are able to visually connect with a teacher who was standing in the same room. During the class, if questions arise, clarification can be provided immediately. Students can create face-to-face connections with other students, and these connections can easily be extended beyond the classroom.

With the prevalence of remote Internet communications, students do not form preconceptions of their classmates based on the classmate's appearance or speech characteristics. Rather, impressions are formed based only on the information presented by the classmate. Some students are more comfortable with this paradigm as it avoids the discomfort of public speaking. Students who do not feel comfortable stating their ideas in class can take time to sit down and think through exactly what they wish to say.

Communication via written media may lead students to take more time to think through their ideas since their words are in a more permanent setting (online) than most conversations carried on during class.

==== Perception of professor ====
Online learning situations also cause a shift in perception of the professor. Whereas anonymity may help some students achieve a greater level of comfort, professors must maintain an active identity with which students may interact. The students should feel that their professor is ready to help whenever they may need it. Although students and professors may not be able to meet in person, emails and correspondence between them should occur in a timely manner. Without this students tend to drop online classes since it seems that they are wandering through a course without anyone to guide them.

=== Virtual world ===
In the virtual world, users create a personal avatar and communicate with others through the virtual identity. The virtual personal figure and voice may draw from the real figure or fantasy worlds. The virtual figure to some degree reflects the personal expectation, and users may adopt a different personality in the virtual world than in reality.

=== Internet forum ===
An Internet forum, or message board, is an online discussion site where people can hold conversations in the form of posted messages. There are many types of Internet forums based on certain themes or groups. The properties of online identities also differ from different type of forums. For example, the users in a university BBS usually know some of the others in reality since the users can only be the students or professors in this university. However, the freedom of expression is limited since some university BBSs are under control of the school administration and the identities are related to student IDs. On another hand, some question-and-answer websites like "ZhiHu" in China are open to the public and users can create accounts only with e-mail address. But they can describe their specialties or personal experiences to show reliability in certain questions, and other users can also invite them to answer questions based on their profiles. The answers and profiles can be either real-name or anonymous.

== Benefits and concerns ==
=== Benefits ===
A discussed positive aspect of virtual communities is that people can present themselves without fear of persecution, whether it is personality traits, behaviors that they are curious about, or the announcement of a real world identity component that has never before been announced. This freedom may give people new opportunities to explore the roles of gender and sexuality in a way that is not harmful and may be helpful to those undertaking a change. Online identity can give people the opportunity to feel comfortable in a wide range of roles, some of which may be underlying aspects of the user's life that the user is unable to portray in the real world..

Online identity has a beneficial effect for minority groups, including racial and ethnic minority populations and people with disabilities. Online identities may help remove prejudices created by stereotypes found in real life, and thus provide a greater sense of inclusion.

One example of these opportunities is the establishment of many communities welcoming LGBTQ+ teenagers who are learning to understand their sexuality. These communities allow teenagers to share their experiences with one another or other older members of the LGBTQ+ community, and provide both a non-threatening and non-judgmental safe place. In a review of such a community, Silberman quotes an information technology worker, Tom Reilly, as stating: "The wonderful thing about online services is that they are an intrinsically decentralized resource. Kids can challenge what adults have to say and make the news".

The online world provides users with a choice to determine which sex, sexuality preference and sexual characteristics they would like to embody. In each online encounter, a user essentially has the opportunity to interchange which identity they would like to portray. As McRae argues in Surkan (2000), "The lack of physical presence and the infinite malleability of bodies complicates sexual interaction in a singular way: because the choice of gender is an "option" rather than a strictly defined biological characteristic, the entire concept of gender as a primary marker of identity becomes partially subverted."

Online identity can offer potential social benefits to those with physical and sensory disabilities. The flexibility of online media provides control over their disclosure of impairment, an opportunity not typically available in real world social interactions. Researchers highlight its value in improving inclusion. However, the affordance of normalization offers the possibility of experiencing non-stigmatized identities while also offering the capacity to create harmful and dangerous outcomes, which may jeopardize participants' safety.

=== Concerns ===
Primarily, concerns regarding virtual identity revolve around the areas of misrepresentation and the contrasting effects of on and offline existence. Sexuality and sexual behavior online provide some of the most controversial debate with many concerned about the predatory nature of some users. This is particularly in reference to concerns about child pornography and the ability of pedophiles to obscure their identity.

The concerns regarding the connection between on and offline lives have challenged the notions of what constitutes a real experience. In reference to gender, sexuality and sexual behavior, the ability to play with these ideas has resulted in a questioning of how virtual experience may affect one's offline emotions. As McRae states, virtual sex not only complicates but drastically unsettles the division between mind, body, and self that has become a comfortable truism in Western metaphysics. When projected into virtuality, mind, body and self all become consciously manufactured constructs through which individuals interact with each other.

==== Reliability ====
The identities that people define in the social web are not necessarily facets of their offline self. Studies show that people lie about themselves on online dating services. In the case of social network services such as Facebook, companies have proposed to sell "friends" as a way to increase a user's visibility, further calling into question the reliability of a person's social identity.

Van Gelder reported an incident occurring on a computer conferencing system during the early 80s where a male psychiatrist posed as Julie, a female psychologist with multiple disabilities including deafness, blindness, and serious facial disfigurement. Julie endeared herself to the computer conferencing community, finding psychological and emotional support from many members. The psychiatrist's choice to present differently was sustained by drawing upon the unbearable stigma attached to Julie's multiple disabilities as justification for not meeting face-to-face. Lack of visual cues allowed the identity transformation to continue, with the psychiatrist also assuming the identity of Julie's husband, who adamantly refused to allow anyone to visit Julie when she claimed to be seriously ill. This example highlights the ease with which identity may be constructed, transformed, and sustained by the textual nature of online interaction and the visual anonymity it affords.

==== Catfishing online ====
Catfishing is a way for a user to create a fake online profile, sometimes with fake photos and information, in order to enter into a relationship, intimate or platonic, with another user. Catfishing became popular in mainstream culture through the MTV reality show Catfish.

== Identity management infrastructures ==
A problem facing anyone who hopes to build a positive online reputation is that reputations are site-specific; for example, one's reputation on eBay cannot be transferred to Slashdot.

Multiple proposals have been made to build an identity management infrastructure into the Web protocols. All of them require an effective public key infrastructure so that the identity of two separate manifestations of an online identity (say, one on Wikipedia and another on Twitter) are probably one and the same.

OpenID, an open, decentralized standard for authenticating users is used for access control, allowing users to log on to different services with the same digital identity. These services must allow and implement OpenID.

=== Context collapse ===
Context collapse describes the phenomena where the occurrence of multiple social groups in one space causes confusion in how to manage one's online identity. This suggests that in managing identities online, individuals are challenged to differentiate their online expression due to the unmanageable size of audience variations. This phenomenon is particularly relevant to social media platforms. Users are often connected with a wide range of social groups such as family, colleagues and friends. When posting on social media, the presence of these different social groups makes it difficult to decide which aspect of one's personality to present. The term was first coined in 2003 by Microsoft researcher danah boyd in relation to social networking platforms such as MySpace and Friendster. Since 2003, the issue of context collapse has become increasingly significant. Users have been forced to implement strategies to combat context collapse. These strategies include using stricter privacy settings and engaging in more "ephemeral mediums" such as Instagram stories and Snapchat in which posts are only temporarily accessible and are less likely to have permanent consequences or an effect on one's reputation.

=== Reputation management ===
Given the malleability of online identities, some economists have expressed surprise that flourishing trading sites, such as eBay, have developed on the Internet. When two pseudonymous identities propose to enter into an online transaction, they are faced with the prisoner's dilemma: the deal can succeed only if the parties are willing to trust each other, but they have no rational basis for doing so. But successful Internet trading sites have developed reputation management systems, such as eBay's feedback system, which record transactions and provide the technical means by which users can rate each other's trustworthiness. However, users with malicious intent can still cause serious problems on such websites.

An online reputation is the perception that one generates on the Internet based on their digital footprint. Digital footprints accumulate through all of the content shared, feedback provided and information that created online. Due to the fact that if someone has a bad online reputation, he can easily change his pseudonym, new accounts on sites such as eBay or Amazon are usually distrusted. If an individual or company wants to manage their online reputation, they will face many more difficulties. This is why a merchant on the web having a brick and mortar shop is usually more trusted.

=== Relation to real-world social constraints ===
Ultimately, online identity cannot be completely free from the social constraints that are imposed in the real world. As Westfall (2000, p. 160) discusses, "the idea of truly departing from social hierarchy and restriction does not occur on the Internet (as perhaps suggested by earlier research into the possibilities presented by the Internet) with identity construction still shaped by others. Westfall raises the important, yet rarely discussed, issue of the effects of literacy and communication skills of the online user." Indeed, these skills or the lack thereof have the capacity to shape one's online perception as they shape one's perception through a physical body in the "real world."

== Disembodiment and implications ==
This issue of gender and sexual reassignment raises the notion of disembodiment and its associated implications. "Disembodiment" is the idea that once the user is online, the need for the body is no longer required, and the user can participate separately from it. This ultimately relates to a sense of detachment from the identity defined by the physical body. In cyberspace, many aspects of sexual identity become blurred and are only defined by the user. Questions of truth will therefore be raised, particularly in reference to online dating and virtual sex. As McRae states, "Virtual sex allows for a certain freedom of expression, of physical presentation and of experimentation beyond one's own real-life limits". At its best, it not only complicates but drastically unsettles the division between mind, body and self in a manner only possible through the construction of an online identity.

== Legal and security issues ==
=== Online identity and user's rights ===
The future of online anonymity depends on how an identity management infrastructure is developed. Law enforcement officials often express their opposition to online anonymity and pseudonymity, which they view as an open invitation to criminals who wish to disguise their identities. Therefore, they call for an identity management infrastructure that would irrevocably tie online identity to a person's legal identity; in most such proposals, the system would be developed in tandem with a secure national identity document. Eric Schmidt, CEO of Google, has stated that the Google+ social network is intended to be exactly such an identity system. The controversy resulting from Google+'s policy of requiring users to sign in using legal names has been dubbed the "nymwars".

Online civil rights advocates, in contrast, argue that there is no need for a privacy-invasive system because technological solutions, such as reputation management systems, are already sufficient and are expected to grow in their sophistication and utility.

=== Online predators ===
An online predator is an Internet user who exploits other users' vulnerability, often for sexual or financial purposes. It is relatively easy to create an online identity which is attractive to people that would not normally become involved with the predator, but fortunately there are a few means by which you can make sure that a person whom you haven't met is actually who they say they are. Many people will trust things such as the style in which someone writes, or the photographs someone has on their web page as a way to identify that person, but these can easily be forged. Long-term Internet relationships may sometimes be difficult to sufficiently understand knowing what someone's identity is actually like.

The most vulnerable age group to online predators is often considered to be young teenagers or older children. "Over time - perhaps weeks or even months - the stranger, having obtained as much personal information as possible, grooms the child, gaining his or her trust through compliments, positive statements, and other forms of flattery to build an emotional bond." The victims often do not suspect anything until it is too late, as the other party usually misleads them to believe that they are of similar age.

The show Dateline on NBC has, overall, conducted three investigations on online predators. They had adults, posing online as teenage juveniles, engage in sexually explicit conversations with other adults (the predators) and arrange to meet them in person. But instead of meeting a teenager, the unsuspecting adult was confronted by Chris Hansen, an NBC News correspondent, arrested, and shown on nationwide television. Dateline held investigations in five different locations apprehending a total of 129 men in all.

Federal laws have been passed in the U.S. to assist the government when trying to catch online predators. Some of these include wiretapping, so online offenders can be caught in advance, before a child becomes a victim. In California, where one Dateline investigation took place, it is a misdemeanor for someone to have sexually tinged conversations with a child online. The men who came to the house were charged with a felony because their intent was obvious.

== The market ==
An online identity that has acquired an excellent reputation is valuable for two reasons: first, one or more persons invested a great deal of time and effort to build the identity's reputation; and second, other users look to the identity's reputation as they try to decide whether it is sufficiently trustworthy. It is therefore unsurprising that online identities have been put up for sale at online auction sites. However, conflicts arise over the ownership of online identities. Recently, a user of a massively multiplayer online game called EverQuest, which is owned by Sony Online Entertainment, Inc., attempted to sell his EverQuest identity on eBay. Sony objected, asserting that the character is Sony's intellectual property, and demanded the removal of the auction; under the terms of the U.S. Digital Millennium Copyright Act (DMCA), eBay could have become a party to a copyright infringement lawsuit if it failed to comply.

== See also ==
- Account verification
- Digital detox
- Digital identity
- E-authentication
- Impression management
- Münchausen by Internet
- On the Internet, nobody knows you're a dog
- Online and offline
- Online diary
- Online identity management
- Online identity theft
- Online reputation
- Persona (user experience)
- Personal information
- Personal identity
- Proteus effect
- Real-name system
- Self-sovereign identity
- Social profiling
- Sherry Turkle
- Shibboleth (Internet2)
- Social web
- User profile
