= Online identity management =

Methods of generating online identity

Online identity management (OIM), also known as online image management, online personal branding, or personal reputation management (PRM), is a set of methods for generating a distinguished web presence of a person on the Internet. Online identity management also refers to identity exposure and identity disclosure, and has particularly developed in the management on online identity in social network services or online dating services.

Identity management is also an important building block of cybersecurity. It forms the basis for most access control types and establishing accountability online.

== Aspects ==
One aspect of the online identity management process has to do with improving the quantity and quality of traffic to sites that have content related to a person. In that aspect, OIM is a part of another discipline called search engine optimization with the difference that the only keyword is the person's name, and the optimization object is not necessary a single web site; it can consider a set of completely different sites that contain positive online references. The objective in this case is to get high rankings for as many sites as possible when someone search for a person's name. If the search engine used is Google, this action is called "to google someone".

Another aspect has to do with impression management, i.e. "the process through which people try to control the impressions other people form of them". One of the objectives, in particular, is to increase the online reputation of the person.

Pseudonyms are sometimes used to protect the true online identity of individuals from harm. This can be the case when presenting unpopular views or dissenting opinion online in a way that will not affect the true identity of the author. Facebook estimates that up to 11.2% of accounts are fake. Many of these profiles are used as logins to protect the true identity of online authors.

An individual's presence could be reflected in any kind of content that refers to that person, including news, participation in blogs and forums, personal web sites, social media presence, pictures, video, etc. Because of that, online identity management often involves participation in social media sites like Facebook, Google+, LinkedIn, Flickr, YouTube, Twitter, Last.fm, Myspace, Quora, Tumblr, Pinterest and other online communities and community websites, and is related to blogging, blog social networks like MyBlogLog and blog search engines like Technorati.

OIM can serve specific purposes such as a professional networking platform. OSN platforms represent who the user is and what attributes they bring to the world. The information a user can plug into their profile is usually not verified, which can lead to specifics forms of false identity. OIM can also consist in more questionable practices such as the case of buying "likes", "friends", or "subscribers".

== Objective ==
The Objective of Online Identity Management is to:

1. Maximize the appearances of positive online references about a specific person, targeting not only to users that actively search for that person on any search engine, but also to those that eventually can reach a person's reference while browsing the web.
2. Build an online identity in case the person's web presence is minimal or nonexistent.
3. Solve online reputation problems. In this case, the process can also be named online reputation management.
4. To express opinions that may be unheard, if the person's reputation was not previously favored.

Online Identity management can be utilized on a personal and professional level. Online identity management utilizes web presence to gain attention from potential huge clients to followers. A person managing online identity will use social media sites like Twitter, Facebook, Instagram Youtube, Snapchat, and networking sites to increase their online activity. They also use other tools like search engine optimization and advertisements to boost their audience and gain insights on their audience. Online Identity Management is most effective with the use of all social networking sites and posting frequently. This technique is used to target their audience and to make sure their audience does not miss any content. Additionally, Online Identity Management can be used to manipulate followers, viewers, and clients by using misleading or over-exaggerated information.

== Motivation ==
The reason why someone would be interested in doing online identity management is closely related to the increasing number of constituencies that use the internet as a tool to find information about people. A survey by CareerBuilder.com found that one in four hiring managers used search engines to screen candidates. One in 10 also checked candidates' profiles on social networking sites such as Facebook, Instagram, Twitter, Youtube and other communicative networks. According to a December 2007 survey by the Ponemon Institute, a privacy research organization, roughly half of U.S. hiring officials use the Internet in vetting job applications. Online identity management may also be used to increase an individual's professional online presence. When practicing online identity management, employers receive a satisfied notion regarding their candidate's professional attitudes and personality. This may result in a candidate receiving the job based on their professional online presence. Online Identity management is key to having a successful business and relationship with the public. An online presence is vital to the digital world we live in today. Many employers check the social network account of their candidate to grasp the kind of person they are. Even after being hired companies will continuously check account to ensure professionalism and company privacy is being maintained.

The concept of manipulating search results to show positive results is intriguing for both individuals and businesses. Individuals that want to hide from their past can use OIM to repair their online image and suppress content that damages their credibility, employability and reputation. By changing what people see when searching for an individual, they are able to create a completely new and positive identity in its place. In 2014, the EU ruled that people have "The right to be forgotten", and that in some circumstances content can be removed from Google's search index.

In 1988, the European Union passed the Safe Harbor Act which prohibited the sharing unauthorized personal information. Many companies to this day voluntarily comply to this law; however, it is the job of the user to fully ensure the safety of their online identity. The European Union later passed the a landmark ruling back in 2014, that stated that all individuals have the "right to be forgotten". This granted user's the removal of all irrelevant data that could harm one's online identity

Online identity management is also a factor and important when a person is seeking a need or good. Depending on companies online viewers and content can encourage or discourage a sale. Online identity management is important because decisions can be made depending on online activity. Depending on the motives of the goods, company, and person their online identity should serve the purpose of heightening their likeness, attractiveness, and exposure.

== See also ==
- Digital identity
- Identity management
- Customer Identity Access Management
- Impression management
- Information privacy
- Internet activism
- Online identity
- Online participation
- Online reputation management (ORM)
- Persona (user experience)
- Personal branding
- Personalized marketing
- Reputation capital
- Reputation system
- Search engine optimization
- Signalling theory
- Social profiling
- Social media optimization
- Social network service
