= Real-name system =

Authentication with one's real name

A real-name system is a system in which users are required to use their legal name when registering an account on a website. Real-name systems are employed on websites such as Facebook. Real-name systems can lead to self-censorship and the chilling effect.

== History ==
Real name systems originated from government regulations. Governments provided citizens with official surnames. This allowed them to track property ownership and inheritance, collect taxes, maintain court records, perform police work, conscript soldiers and control epidemics.

== Use in different countries ==
=== Germany ===
For privacy reasons, Germany's 1997 § 13 VI Telemediengesetz (nowadays: § 19 II TTDSG) does not allow forcing people to use real-names if a real-name is not necessary for an internet service. On 27 January 2022, the highest court in civil matters, the Bundesgerichtshof, decided that Facebook's ban of pseudonyms is illegal for users who registered before GDPR was implemented in May 2018.

=== South Korea ===
South Korea was the first country to put an internet real-name system into practice. Since 2009, 35 Korean websites have implemented a name registration system in compliance with South Korea's amended Information and Communications Network Act. This act was enforced after the suicide of Choi Jin-sil, which was believed to have been related to malicious bulletin board comments about her. Real name systems aim to minimize the amount of negative information published on the Internet and encourage netizens to be responsible for their online behavior.

South Koreans have been familiar with offline real-name systems since the mid-1990s, when legislation was introduced that required a real name to be used for property and financial transactions. In August 2011 hackers accessed the databases for the real-name system, obtaining the registration numbers of 35 million people.

On 23 August 2012, the Constitutional Court of Korea ruled unanimously that the real-name requirements imposed on portal service providers were unconstitutional, claiming that this violates freedom of speech in cyberspace. As a result, the so-called "Choi Jin-sil Law" was discarded.

The Constitutional Court said:

The system does not seem to have been beneficial to the public. Despite the enforcement of the system, the number of illegal or malicious postings online has not decreased. Instead, users moved to foreign Websites and the system became discriminatory against domestic operators. It also prevented foreigners who didn’t have a resident registration number here from expressing their opinions online.

=== China ===
The Chinese government in 2011 promulgated its Regulations on the Development and Management of microblogging, which stated that microblogging sites should ensure users were registered under their real names. Major microblogging sites like Sina Weibo, 163 and Sohu agreed to put real name systems into practice by 16 March 2012. Users who had not provided their real information would be barred from posting and transmitting messages thereafter. In February 2015, the Cyberspace Administration of China introduced Provisions on the Administration of Account Names of Internet Users. Article 5 of the provisions requires internet information service providers to ensure that users register accounts after undergoing real identity information authentication. This effectively imposed real name policies on all internet services in China. On 1 June 2017, the Chinese Cybersecurity Law took effect, requiring that everyone who uses Chinese websites to provide their phone number. China's state-run media claimed this would provide a "safe and real" Internet environment.

With respect to video games, Chinese regulations require real-name authentication ("real-name ID") since 1 January 2020. The regulations are set to become more stringent on 1 June 2021, requiring authentication with a government system instead of third-party services. The aim of the regulations is to curb excessive gaming by minors. People under 18 are restricted by these regulations to 90 minutes of gaming between 08:00 and 22:00 (180 minutes on holidays), and are also subject to restrictions on in-app payments based on their age.

As a result, online platforms such as Bilibili, Douyin, and Kuaishou were forced to use the real name system as well ID verification especially after accounts were flagged.

== Social networking sites ==
The enforcement of real-name systems has resulted in a series of conflicts known as nymwars, which raised issues regarding naming, cultural sensitivity, public and private identity, privacy, and the role of social media in modern discourse, including targeting dissent around the globe, mostly in authoritarian countries.

== Currently active ==
=== Facebook ===
Facebook employs a real-name system. Its online Name Policy states: "Facebook is a community where people use their real identities. We require everyone to provide their real names, so you always know who you're connecting with. This helps keep our community safe." This strongly encourages users to provide real names when creating an account.

Facebook's first users were university students. According to Danah Boyd, a social media scholar, "people provided their name because they saw the site as an extension of campus life." Later users adopted the norms and practices of the early adopters. The use of real names contributed to the quality and quantity of information Facebook has about its users. Facebook became an identity service by encouraging users to share their lives, including their real names.

Emil Protalinski, technology journalist for The Next Web, states that some "Facebook users opt to use pseudonyms to hide from stalkers, abusive exes, and even governments that don't condone free speech." Pseudonyms allow these users to connect with colleagues, friends, and family without compromising their safety.

"People feel as though their privacy has been violated when their agency has been undermined or when information about a particular social context has been obscured in ways that subvert people's ability to make an informed decision about what to reveal." Some users may feel uncomfortable with displaying their real names and choose a fake name that appears real to others.

== Formerly active or defunct ==
=== Google (2011 - 2014) ===
Google+ previously introduced a real-name policy in July 2011, as a way to crack down on spamming and botting, requiring users to use their real names. Google+ began to expand its real-name policy on other Google-associated sites such as the Google Play Store, Google Maps, and Gmail by November 2011 and eventually YouTube by 6 November 2013. User accounts that were identified as not following the policy were suspended via automated moderation. Compared to Facebook, some users are able to bypass the moderation using varying fictitious names on many Google-associated sites, especially on YouTube. After wide-ranging criticisms and backlash from a number of high-profile commentators, Google dropped the real-name policy in July 2014 and ended restrictions on names.

=== Quora (Until 2021) ===
Previously, Quora required users to register with the complete form of their real names rather than an Internet pseudonym or other screen name. Although verification of names was not required, false names could be reported by the community.

On 19 April 2021, Quora eliminated the requirement that users use their real names and allowed users to use pseudonyms.

== Variable ==
=== X (formerly Twitter) ===
Twitter registration page saying "Name looks great" after a made-up, meaningless, and unformatted name is entered.

Unlike Facebook, the Twitter social networking site does not require real-names for Twitter accounts. According to the 2024 private policy, either a real-name or a pseudonym can be used. Until November 2022, Twitter still verified accounts of prominent users such as celebrities and businesses in order to protect them against identity theft/fraud. Since then, the verification policy has been modified such that accounts that are at least 90 days old and have a verified phone number receive verification upon subscribing to X Premium or Verified Organizations; this status persists as long as the subscription remains active. Additional checkmark colors were introduced: gold for verified organizations and businesses, and gray for government-affiliated accounts. Twitter does not require real names; users can use either real names or pseudonyms per the 2024 privacy policy. Verification controversies have arisen due to the shift from merit-based to paid verification, leading to impersonation risks and user dissatisfaction. Twitter's verification and platform access policies continue to evolve, including experimental pay-per-year registration fees for new users in some countries in 2023-2024.

== See also ==
- Age verification system
- Internet censorship
- Internet surveillance
- Online age verification laws by country
