= Social media optimization =

Form of optimization

Social media optimization (SMO) is the use of online platforms to generate income or publicity to increase the awareness of a brand, event, product or service. Types of social media involved include RSS feeds, blogging sites, social bookmarking sites, social news websites, video sharing websites such as YouTube and social networking sites such as Facebook, Instagram, TikTok and X (Twitter). SMO is similar to search engine optimization (SEO) in that the goal is to drive web traffic, and draw attention to a company or creator. SMO's focal point is on gaining organic links to social media content. In contrast, SEO's core is about reaching the top of the search engine hierarchy. In general, social media optimization refers to optimizing a website and its content to encourage more users to use and share links to the website across social media and networking sites.

SMO is used to strategically create online content ranging from well-written text to eye-catching digital photos or video clips that encourages and entices people to engage with a website. Users share this content, via its weblink, with social media contacts and friends. Common examples of social media engagement are "liking and commenting on posts, retweeting, embedding, sharing, and promoting content". Social media optimization is also an effective way of implementing online reputation management (ORM), meaning that if someone posts bad reviews of a business, an SMO strategy can ensure that the negative feedback is not the first link to come up in a list of search engine results.

In the 2010s, with social media sites overtaking TV as a source for news for young people, news organizations have become increasingly reliant on social media platforms for generating web traffic. Publishers such as The Economist employ large social media teams to optimize their online posts and maximize traffic, while other major publishers now use advanced artificial intelligence (AI) technology to generate higher volumes of web traffic.

== Relationship with search engine optimization ==
Social media optimization is an increasingly important factor in search engine optimization, which is the process of designing a website in a way so that it has as high a ranking as possible on search engines. Search engines are increasingly utilizing the recommendations of users of social networks such as Reddit, Facebook, Tumblr, Twitter, YouTube, LinkedIn, Pinterest and Instagram to rank pages in the search engine result pages. The implication is that when a webpage is shared or "liked" by a user on a social network, it counts as a "vote" for that webpage's quality. Thus, search engines can use such votes accordingly to properly ranked websites in search engine results pages. Furthermore, since it is more difficult to tip the scales or influence the search engines in this way, search engines are putting more stock into social search. This, coupled with increasingly personalized search based on interests and location, has significantly increased the importance of a social media presence in search engine optimization. Due to personalized search results, location-based social media presences on websites such as Yelp, Google Places, Foursquare, and Yahoo! Local have become increasingly important. While social media optimization is related to search engine marketing, it differs in several ways. Primarily, SMO focuses on driving web traffic from sources other than search engines, though improved search engine ranking is also a benefit of successful social media optimization. Further, SMO is helpful to target particular geographic regions in order to target and reach potential customers. This helps in lead generation (finding new customers) and contributes to high conversion rates (i.e., converting previously uninterested individuals into people who are interested in a brand or organization).

== Relationship with viral marketing ==
Social media optimization is in many ways connected to the technique of viral marketing or "viral seeding" where word of mouth is created through the use of networking in social bookmarking, video and photo sharing websites. An effective SMO campaign can harness the power of viral marketing; for example, 80% of activity on Pinterest is generated through "repinning." Furthermore, by following social trends and utilizing alternative social networks, websites can retain existing followers while also attracting new ones. This allows businesses to build an online following and presence, all linking back to the company's website for increased traffic. For example, with an effective social bookmarking campaign, not only can website traffic be increased, but a site's rankings can also be increased. In a similar way, the engagement with blogs creates a similar result by sharing content through the use of RSS in the blogosphere. Social media optimization is considered an integral part of an online reputation management (ORM) or search engine reputation management (SERM) strategy for organizations or individuals who care about their online presence. SMO is one of six key influencers that affect Social Commerce Construct (SCC). Online activities such as consumers' evaluations and advices on products and services constitute part of what creates a Social Commerce Construct (SCC).

Social media optimization is not limited to marketing and brand building. Increasingly, smart businesses are integrating social media participation as part of their knowledge management strategy (i.e., product/service development, recruiting, employee engagement and turnover, brand building, customer satisfaction and relations, business development and more). Additionally, social media optimization can be implemented to foster a community of the associated site, allowing for a healthy business-to-consumer (B2C) relationship.

== Origins and implementation ==
According to technologist Danny Sullivan, the term "social media optimization" was first used and described by marketer Rohit Bhargava on his marketing blog in August 2006. In the same post, Bhargava established the five important rules of social media optimization. Bhargava believed that by following his rules, anyone could influence the levels of traffic and engagement on their site, increase popularity, and ensure that it ranks highly in search engine results. An additional 11 SMO rules have since been added to the list by other marketing contributors.

The 16 rules of SMO, according to one source, are as follows:

1. Increase your linkability
2. Make tagging and bookmarking easy
3. Reward inbound links
4. Help your content to "travel" via sharing
5. Encourage the mashup, where users are allowed to remix content
6. Be a user resource, even if it doesn't help you (e.g., provide resources and information for users)
7. Reward helpful and valuable users
8. Participate (join the online conversation)
9. Know how to target your audience
10. Create new, quality content ("web scraping" of existing online content is ignored by good search engines)
11. Be "real" in the tone and style of the posts
12. Don't forget your roots; be humble
13. Don't be afraid to experiment, innovate, try new things and "stay fresh"
14. Develop an SMO strategy
15. Choose your SMO tactics wisely
16. Make SMO a key part of your marketing process and develop company best practices

Bhargava's initial five rules were more specifically designed to SMO, while the list is now much broader and addresses everything that can be done across different social media platforms. According to author and CEO of TopRank Online Marketing, Lee Odden, a Social Media Strategy is also necessary to ensure optimization. This is a similar concept to Bhargava's list of rules for SMO.

The Social Media Strategy may consider:

1. Objectives e.g. creating brand awareness and using social media for external communications.
2. Listening e.g. monitoring conversations relating to customers and business objectives.
3. Audience e.g. finding out who the customers are, what they do, who they are influenced by, and what they frequently talk about. It is important to work out what customers want in exchange for their online engagement and attention.
4. Participation and content e.g. establishing a presence and community online and engaging with users by sharing useful and interesting information.
5. Measurement e.g. keeping a record of likes and comments on posts, and the number of sales to monitor growth and determine which tactics are most useful in optimizing social media.

According to Lon Safko and David K. Brake in The Social Media Bible, it is also important to act like a publisher by maintaining an effective organizational strategy, to have an original concept and unique "edge" that differentiates one's approach from competitors, and to experiment with new ideas if things do not work the first time. If a business is blog-based, an effective method of SMO is using widgets that allow users to share content to their personal social media platforms. This will ultimately reach a wider target audience and drive more traffic to the original post. Blog widgets and plug-ins for post-sharing are most commonly linked to Facebook, LinkedIn and x.com. They occasionally also link to social media platforms such as Tumblr and Pinterest. Many sharing widgets also include user counters which indicate how many times the content has been liked and shared across different social media pages. This can influence whether or not new users will engage with the post, and also gives businesses an idea of what kind of posts are most successful at engaging audiences. By using relevant and trending keywords in titles and throughout blog posts, a business can also increase search engine optimization and the chances of their content of being read and shared by a large audience. The root of effective SMO is the content that is being posted, so professional content creation tools can be very beneficial. These can include editing programs such as Photoshop, GIMP, Final Cut Pro, and Dreamweaver. Many websites also offer customization options such as different layouts to personalize a page and create a point of difference.

== Publishing industry ==
With social media sites overtaking TV as a source for news for young people, news organizations have become increasingly reliant on social media platforms for generating traffic. A report by Reuters Institute for the Study of Journalism described how a 'second wave of disruption' had hit news organizations, with publishers such as The Economist having to employ large social media teams to optimize their posts, and maximize traffic. Within the context of the publishing industry, even professional fields are utilizing SMO. Because doctors want to maximize exposure to their research findings SMO has also found a place in the medical field.

Today, 3.8 billion people globally are using some form of social media. People frequently obtain health-related information from online social media platforms like Twitter and Facebook. Healthcare professionals and scientists can communicate with other medical-counterparts to discuss research and findings through social media platforms. These platforms provide researchers with data sets and surveillance that help detect patterns and behavior in preventing, informing, and studying global disease; COVID-19. Additionally, researchers utilize SMO to reach and recruit hard-to-reach patients. SMO narrows specified demographics that filter necessary data in a given study.

== Social network games ==
Social media gaming is online gaming activity performed through social media sites with friends and online gaming activity that promotes social media interaction. Examples of the former include FarmVille, Clash of Clans, Clash Royale, FrontierVille, and Mafia Wars. In these games a player's social network is exploited to recruit additional players and allies. An example of the latter is Empire Avenue, a virtual stock exchange where players buy and sell shares of each other's social network worth. Nielsen Media Research estimates that, as of June 2010, social networking and playing online games account for about one-third of all online activity by Americans.

== Facebook ==
Facebook has in recent years become a popular channel for advertising, alongside traditional forms such as television, radio, and print. With over 1 billion active users, and 50% of those users logging into their accounts every day it is an important communication platform that businesses can utilize and optimize to promote their brand and drive traffic to their websites. There are three commonly used strategies to increase advertising reach on Facebook:

1. Improving the effectiveness of posts, achieved by adjusting the length and timing of posts to influence the number of likes and comments it receives. This will help the post reach a greater number of Facebook users, ultimately increasing its reach.
2. Increasing network size, achieved by analyzing user behavior to determine how often to post and what type of content to post.
3. Buying more reach, achieved by paying Facebook to advertise a post.

Improving effectiveness and increasing network size are organic approaches, while buying more reach is a paid approach which does not require any further action. Most businesses will attempt an "organic" approach to gaining a significant following before considering a paid approach. Because Facebook requires a login, it is important that posts are public to ensure they will reach the widest possible audience. Posts that have been heavily shared and interacted with by users are displayed as 'highlighted posts' at the top of newsfeeds. In order to achieve this status, the posts need to be engaging, interesting, or useful. This can be achieved by being spontaneous, asking questions, addressing current events and issues, and optimizing trending hashtags and keywords. The more engagement a post receives, the further it will spread and the more likely it is to feature on first in search results.

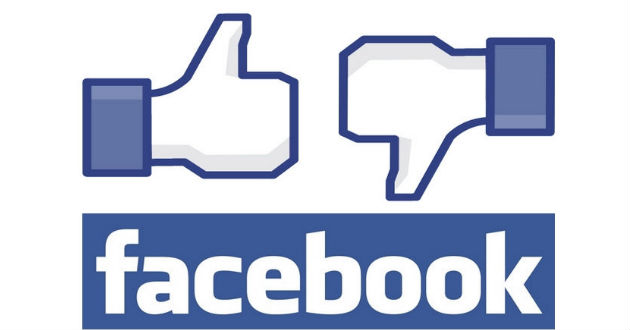
Due to its popularity and widespread use, Facebook is a useful channel for social media optimization.

Another organic approach to Facebook optimization is cross-linking different social platforms. By posting links to websites or social media sites in the profile 'about' section, it is possible to direct traffic and ultimately increase search engine optimization. Another option is to share links to relevant videos and blog posts. Facebook Connect is a functionality that launched in 2008 to allow Facebook users to sign up to different websites, enter competitions, and access exclusive promotions by logging in with their existing Facebook account details. This is beneficial to users as they don't have to create a new login every time they want to sign up to a website, but also beneficial to businesses as Facebook users become more likely to share their content. Often the two are interlinked, where in order to access parts of a website, a user has to like or share certain things on their personal profile or invite a number of friends to like a page. This can lead to greater traffic flow to a website as it reaches a wider audience. Businesses have more opportunities to reach their target markets if they choose a paid approach to SMO. When Facebook users create an account, they are urged to fill out their personal details such as gender, age, location, education, current and previous employers, religious and political views, interests, and personal preferences such as movie and music tastes. Facebook then takes this information and allows advertisers to use it to determine how to best market themselves to users that they know will be interested in their product. This can also be known as micro-targeting. If a user clicks on a link to like a page, it will show up on their profile and newsfeed. This then feeds back into organic social media optimization, as friends of the user will see this and be encouraged to click on the page themselves. Although advertisers are buying mass reach, they are attracting a customer base with a genuine interest in their product. Once a customer base has been established through a paid approach, businesses will often run promotions and competitions to attract more organic followers.

The number of businesses that use Facebook to advertise also holds significant relevance. in 2017, there were three million businesses that advertised on Facebook. This makes Facebook the world's largest platform for social media advertising. What also holds importance is the amount of money leading businesses are spending on Facebook advertising alone. Procter & Gamble spend $60 million every year on Facebook advertising. Other advertisers on Facebook include Microsoft, with a yearly spend of £35 million, Amazon, Nestle and American Express all with yearly expenditures above £25 million per year.

Furthermore, the number of small businesses advertising on Facebook is of relevance. This number has grown rapidly over the upcoming years and demonstrates how important social media advertising actually is. Currently 70% of the UK's small businesses use Facebook advertising. This is a substantial number of advertisers. Almost half of the world's small businesses use social media marketing product of some sort. This demonstrates the impact that social media has had on the current digital marketing era.

== Engagement rate ==
The engagement rate (ER) represents the activity of users specific for a certain profile on Facebook, Instagram, TikTok or any other social media. A common way to calculate it is the following:

$ER = \frac{\overline{interactions}}{followers} \times 100\%$

In the above formula followers is the total number of followers (friends, subscribers, etc.), interactions stands for the number of interactions, such as likes, comments, personal messages, shares. The latter is averaged over the certain period of time, which should normally be short enough to ensure the variance in followers number is negligible during this period.

== See also ==
- Ambient awareness
- Customer engagement
- Online identity management
- Online presence management
- Online optimization
- Propaganda
- Public relations
- Reputation management
- Search engine marketing
- Search engine optimization
- Social cognitive optimization
- Social media intelligence
- Social media marketing
- Social network
- Social profiling
- Virtual collective consciousness
