= Social media intelligence =

Tools for analyzing and synchronizing data from social media websites

Social media intelligence (SMI or SOCMINT) comprises the collective tools and solutions that allow organizations to analyze conversations, respond to synchronize social signals, and synthesize social data points into meaningful trends and analysis, based on the user's needs. Social media intelligence allows one to utilize intelligence gathering from social media sites, using both intrusive or non-intrusive means, from open and closed social networks. This type of intelligence gathering is one element of OSINT (Open- Source Intelligence).

To support both the sensing and seizing of social signals at scale, organisations increasingly rely on dedicated audience intelligence platforms which combine data aggregation, NLP-driven analysis, and cross-platform monitoring.

The term 'Social Media Intelligence' was coined in a 2012 paper written by Sir David Omand, Jamie Bartlett and Carl Miller for the Centre for the Analysis of Social Media, at the London-based think tank, Demos. The authors argued that social media is now an important part of intelligence and security work, but that technological, analytical, and regulatory changes are needed before it can be considered a powerful new form of intelligence, including amendments to the United Kingdom Regulation of Investigatory Powers Act 2000.

Given the dynamic evolution of social media and social media monitoring, our current understanding of how social media monitoring can help organizations create business value is inadequate. As a result, there is a need to study how organizations can (a) extract and analyze social media data related to their business (Sensing), and (b) utilize external intelligence gained from social media monitoring for specific business initiatives (Seizing).

== Governmental use ==
In Thailand, the Technology Crime Suppression Division not only employs a 30-person team to scrutinize social media for content deemed disrespectful to the monarchy, known as lèse-majesté but also encourages citizens to report such content. Particularly targeting the youth, they run a "Cyber Scout" program where participants are rewarded for reporting individuals posting material perceived as detrimental to the monarchy.

Instances in Israel involve the arrest of Palestinians by the police for their social media posts. An example includes a 15-year-old girl who posted a Facebook status with the words "forgive me," raising suspicions among Israeli authorities that she might be planning an attack.

In Egypt, a leaked 2014 call for tender from the Ministry of Interior reveals efforts to procure a social media monitoring system to identify leading figures and prevent protests before they occur.

In the United States, ZeroFOX faced criticism for sharing a report with Baltimore officials showcasing how their social media monitoring tool could track riots following Freddie Gray's funeral. The report labeled 19 individuals, including two prominent figures from the #BlackLivesMatter movement, as "threat actors."

In the UK, the Association of Chief Police Officers of England, Wales, and Northern Ireland emphasized the significance of social media in intelligence gathering during anti-fracking protests in 2011. Social media analysis closely monitored protests against the badger cull in 2013, with a 2013 report revealing a team of 17 officers in the National Domestic Extremism Unit scanning public tweets, YouTube videos, Facebook profiles, and other online content from UK citizens.

== Effects on political opinion ==
During the 2016 United States presidential election, the Senate Intelligence Committee released reports containing information about Russia’s use of troll farms to mislead black voters about voting. Also, German researchers in 2010 analyzed Twitter messages regarding the German federal election concluding that Twitter played a role in leading users to a specific political opinion.

In a broad sense, social media refers to a conversational, distributed mode of content generation, dissemination, and communication among communities. Different from broadcast-based traditional and industrial media, social media has torn down the boundaries between authorship and readership, while the information consumption and dissemination process is becoming intrinsically intertwined with the process of generating and sharing information.

An example of how SOCMINT is used to affect political opinions is the Cambridge Analytica Scandal. Cambridge Analytica was a company that purchased data from Facebook about its users without the consent or knowledge of Americans. They used this data to build a "psychological warfare tool" to persuade US voters to elect Donald Trump as president in the 2016 election. Christopher Wylie, the whistleblower, reported that personal information was taken in early 2014, and used to build a system that could target US voters with personalized pollical advertisements. More than 50 million individuals' data was exploited and manipulated.

== Law enforcement ==
In September of 2023, the Philadelphia Police Department began using social media to track and stay one step ahead of criminal activity to stop meetups and potential robberies. This new approach has made officers utilize another tool in their field by being able to find new information as quickly as possible.

Law enforcement agencies worldwide are increasingly employing social media intelligence to enhance their capabilities in both crime prevention and investigation. By analyzing publicly available data from social platforms such as Facebook, Twitter, and Instagram, police can track criminal activities, identify suspects, and even prevent potential crimes before they occur. For instance, the FBI utilizes SOCMINT to monitor threats and investigate criminal activities, including analyzing posts, images, and videos that might signal illegal activities or security concerns.

== Marketing ==
SOCMINT collects data from both organizations and people on an individual level. It has a variety of different purposes, and though its main goal is to improve national security advancements, there are several other benefits as well. This intelligence can identify patterns, predict trends, gather information in current time, etc. In addition, these aspects have allowed for both improvement within businesses and help for law enforcement.

Artificial Social Networking Intelligence (ASNI) refers to the application of artificial intelligence within social networking services and social media platforms. It encompasses various technologies and techniques used to automate, personalize, enhance, improve, and synchronize user's interactions and experiences within social networks. ASNI is expected to evolve rapidly, influencing how we interact online and shaping their digital experiences. Transparency, ethical considerations, media influence bias, and user control over data will be crucial to ensure responsible development and positive impact.

Google provides many free services and has built an entire media brand with its vast variety of products. Along with data collection, Google also owns two advertising services, Google Ads, and Google AdSense. Surprisingly, most of its revenue comes from advertising, not direct sales of its services or products. Google makes money by selling advertising services to advertisers. They provide ad space to websites on Google, and target ads to consumers of Google services and products. Google can market ads using SOCMINT to collect data from its users and generate revenue.

Research shows that various social media platforms on the Internet such as Twitter, Tumblr (micro-blogging websites), Facebook (a popular social networking website), YouTube (largest video sharing and hosting website), Blogs and discussion forums are being misused by extremist groups for spreading their beliefs and ideologies, promoting radicalization, recruiting members and creating online virtual communities sharing a common agenda. Popular microblogging websites such as Twitter are being used as a real-time platform for information sharing and communication during the planning and mobilization of civil unrest-related events.

== See also ==
- Algorithmic curation
- Ambient awareness
- Collective influence algorithm
- Information retrieval
- Media intelligence
- Online algorithm
- Open-source intelligence
- Sentiment analysis
- Social bot
- Social cloud computing
- Social data revolution
- Social media analytics
- Social media mining
- Social media optimization
- Social profiling
- Social software
- Virtual collective consciousness
