= Zignal Labs =

Media intelligence software company

Zignal Labs is a real-time media intelligence company that serves military and law enforcement agencies as well as private marketing and public relations customers. It was founded in 2011 by Josh Ginsberg, Adam Beaugh, and Jim Hornthal and is headquartered in San Francisco. It analyzes over 8 billion social media posts per day in over 100 languages using machine learning, computer vision, and optical character recognition. It has worked with US agencies including Immigration and Customs Enforcement (ICE) and the National Oceanic and Atmospheric Administration (NOAA), military forces including the Israel Defense Forces (IDF), and private-sector customers such as Airbnb and The Washington Post.

== History ==
Zignal Labs was founded in 2011 by Josh Ginsberg, Adam Beaugh, and Jim Hornthal, who sought to provide information on political candidates in realtime from a variety of media sources for media war rooms used in political campaigns.

After the 2012 election, the company changed its name from Politear to Zignal Labs and launched its media intelligence software platform into other industries, using the software's capabilities to analyze conversations and track key influencers, issues, and sentiment around businesses. Zignal Labs's enterprise customers have included Airbnb and the Brunswick Group.

The 2016 election provided Zignal Labs with a large amount of exposure, where Zignal Command Centers were used at both the Republican and Democratic National Conventions. The company partnered with The Washington Post's "The Daily 202" segment to provide presidential campaign graphics and was a part of the "CNN Politics Campaign 2016: Like, Share, Elect" exhibit at the Newseum.

In 2021, Zignal Labs announced that it would be creating a "public sector advisory board" and seeking to provide services to customers in the defense and intelligence industries.

In 2022, Zignal Labs was in talks with Anomaly Six about a potential partnership, which the two companies decided not to pursue.

In 2025, The Lever reported that US Immigration and Customs Enforcement (ICE) signed a five-year, $5.7-million contract with Carahsoft to license Zignal Labs' social media surveillance software to provide "real-time data analysis for criminal investigations." The Lever noted that the partnership came amid the second Trump administration's efforts to deport political dissidents identified through social media and other means. The Surveillance Technology Oversight Project (STOP) described the deal as an assault on democracy and free speech.

A 2025 pamphlet produced by Zignal Labs also highlighted the company's work with the US Marines, the US State Department, and the Israel Defense Forces, stating the company's data analytics platform was providing "tactical intelligence" to "operators on the ground" in the Gaza Strip during the Gaza war.

Other Zignal Labs public sector customers include the National Oceanic and Atmospheric Administration, the US Department of Transportation, and the US Secret Service.

== Products and services ==
=== Zignal Enterprise ===
The media intelligence platform uses Big Data to provide information for marketing and PR departments. It pulls in data from TV, radio, traditional print media, online media and social media into one location, in realtime and displays it using "visualization widgets." The platform allows users to view data from a high level and then dig into discover the content that is driving the conversation.

=== Zignal Command Center ===
The customizable multi-screen command center displays the data.
