= Anomaly Six =

American media intelligence company

Anomaly Six LLC
- Industry: Media intelligence
- Founded: 2018; 8 years ago
- Founders: Former military intelligence officers Brendan Huff and Jeffrey Heinz
- Headquarters: Alexandria, Virginia, U.S.
- Products: Location data products
- Website: www.anomalysix.com

Anomaly Six (A6) is a media intelligence company. It sells global-location-data products to the United States government and the private sector. The company has embedded its software in over 500 mobile applications, giving it the ability to track hundreds of millions of mobile phones. In one presentation, the company claimed it could track 3 billion phones in real time.

== History ==
The company was founded in 2018 by two former military intelligence officers. It is based in Alexandria, Virginia.

The company purchases cell phone location data from advertisers who in turn get the information from embedded software development kits (SDK) in commonly used phone applications. The publishers of apps frequently allow third parties to insert SDKs into their apps for a fee. Some of the apps have Anomaly Six's own SDK embedded in them. This system often relies on disclosures in the complex terms of service that must be agreed to in order to use an application. Most apps' privacy policies do not disclose whether or not SDKs are embedded in their product.

In September 2020, U.S. Special Operations Command Africa, an operational unit of the United States Special Operations Command, paid Anomaly 6 $589,500 for a "Commercial Telemetry Feed". This is the first reported contract between the United States government and Anomaly 6.

In April 2022, it was revealed that the company had demonstrated its surveillance ability by tracking the mobile phones of members of the CIA and NSA. The company revealed the tracking during a meeting between A6 and Zignal Labs. The two companies were in talks to discuss a potential partnership, which they decided not to proceed on.
