= Sepandar Kamvar =

Iranian computer scientist

Sep Kamvar
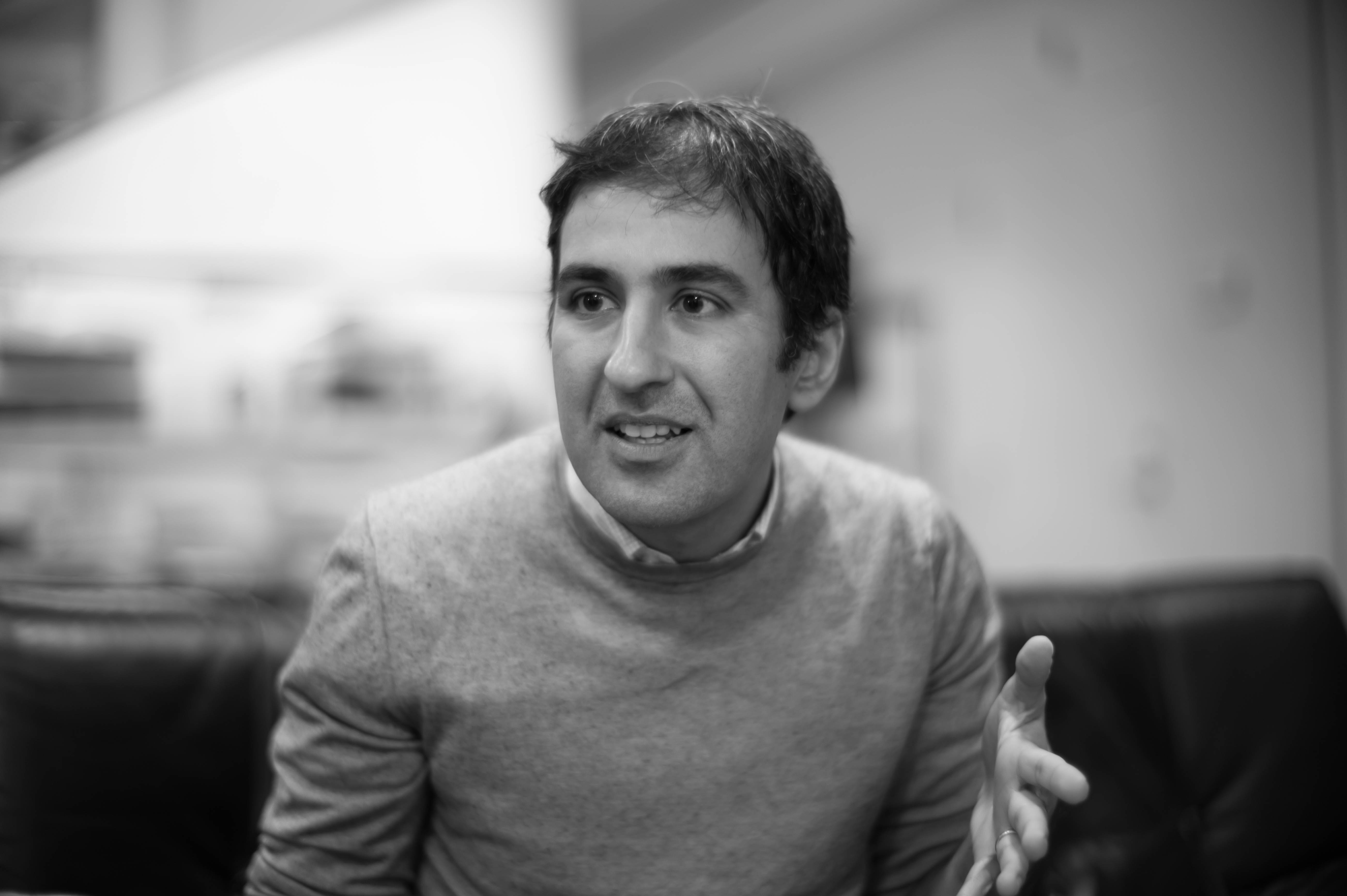
- Education: Princeton University (AB); Stanford University (PhD)
- Occupation: Computer Scientist

Sepandar David Kamvar, also known as Sep Kamvar, is a computer scientist, artist, author and entrepreneur. He is a cofounder of Mosaic, an AI-powered construction company, Celo, a cryptocurrency protocol, and Wildflower Schools, a decentralized network of Montessori microschools. He was previously a Professor of Media Arts and Sciences and LG Career Development Chair at MIT, and director of the Social Computing group at the MIT Media Lab. He left MIT in 2016.

== Computer science ==
Kamvar's main contributions to computer science have been at the intersection of computer science and mathematics, particularly in the fields of personalized search, peer-to-peer networks, social search and data mining.

=== Personalized search ===
As a graduate student at Stanford University, Kamvar developed tools that made it possible to compute personalized PageRank. He also developed the first efficient algorithm for adding personal context to the internet search process.

In 2003, Kamvar co-founded Kaltix, a personalized search engine company. He was the CEO of Kaltix until Google acquired the company in September 2003. After the acquisition of Kaltix, Kamvar joined Google, where he led the personalization efforts between 2003 and 2007.

=== Peer-to-peer networks ===
Kamvar's research and work in peer-to-peer networks focused on the social mechanisms that reward cooperation and punish adversarial behavior. His 2003 paper, EigenTrust, is one of the most highly cited papers in the field.

=== Dog programming language ===
Dog is a high-level programming language created by Kamvar and Salman Ahmad at MIT Media Lab.

It was announced in spring 2012, and stems from the frustration faced by Kamvar with existing languages, and felt they made it needlessly difficult to write code that handled social interactions. It is designed to facilitate easier creation of social computing applications, and is designed to facilitate programming in a natural language and allow newcomers the chance to learn programming more easily.

== Art ==
Kamvar is an advocate for using the web as a medium for artistic expression. He believes the ability to constantly change and be viewed by millions of people simultaneously makes the web an opportune medium for art.

=== We Feel Fine ===
Kamvar created We Feel Fine with Jonathan Harris in 2005. Debuting in 2006, it is an interactive experience using more than 12 million human feelings collected over three years by scouring blog posts every 10 minutes for occurrences of the phrases "I feel" and "I am feeling". Since its debut, We Feel Fine has been exhibited all over the world, with Fast Company naming the project one of the "Decade's 14 Biggest Design Moments."

In 2009, Kamvar and Harris took the findings from the four years since We Feel Fine was launched in 2006 and turned them into a book called "We Feel Fine: An Almanac of Human Emotion".

=== I Want You To Want Me ===
Kamvar created "I Want You To Want Me" with Jonathan Harris in 2007. It is an interactive installation that searches online dating sites for certain phrases and displays them in blue and pink balloons that float and bump into each other. The project was commissioned by the New York Museum of Modern Art (MoMA) for their "Design and the Elastic Mind" exhibition. It was installed on Valentine's Day, February 14, 2008.

== Education ==
Kamvar earned a bachelor's degree in chemistry from Princeton University in 1999. He received his Ph.D. in scientific computing and computational mathematics at Stanford University in 2004 under the guidance of Christopher Manning.

== Bibliography ==
- We Feel Fine: An Almanac of Human Emotion (2009) ISBN 1-4391-1683-0
- Numerical Algorithms for Personalized Search in Self-organizing Information Networks (2010) ISBN 0-6911-4503-2
- Syntax & Sage: Reflections on Software and Nature (2015) ISBN 9780692563632, 0692563636
