= Virtual collective consciousness =

Virtual collective consciousness (VCC) is a term rebooted and promoted by two behavioral scientists, Yousri Marzouki and Olivier Oullier in their 2012 Huffington Post article titled: "Revolutionizing Revolutions: Virtual Collective Consciousness and the Arab Spring", after its first appearance in 1999-2000. VCC is now defined as an internal knowledge catalyzed by social media platforms and shared by a plurality of individuals driven by the spontaneity, the homogeneity, and the synchronicity of their online actions. VCC occurs when a large group of persons, brought together by a social media platform think and act with one mind and share collective emotions. Thus, they are able to coordinate their efforts efficiently, and could rapidly spread their word to a worldwide audience. When interviewed about the concept of VCC that appeared in the book - Hyperconnectivity and the Future of Internet Communication - he edited, Professor of Pervasive Computing, Adrian David Cheok mentioned the following: "The idea of a global (collective) virtual consciousness is a bottom-up process and a rather emergent property resulting from a momentum of complex interactions taking place in social networks. This kind of collective behaviour (or intelligence) results from a collision between a physical world and a virtual world and can have a real impact in our life by driving collective action."

== Etymology ==
In 1999-2000, Richard Glen Boire provided a cursory mention and the only occurrence of the term "Virtual collective consciousness" in his text as follows:

The trend of technology is to overcome the limitations of the human body. And, the Web has been characterized as a virtual collective consciousness and unconsciousness

— Richard Glen Boire, Journal of Cognitive Liberties, 1999/2000

The recent definition of VCC evolved from the first empirical study that provided a cyberpsychological insight into the contribution of Facebook to the 2011 Tunisian revolution. In this study, the concept was originally called "collective cyberconsciousness". The latter is an extension of the idea of "collective consciousness" coupled with "citizen media" usage. The authors of this study also made a parallel between this original definition of VCC and other comparable concepts such as Durkheim's collective representation, Žižek's "collective mind" or Boguta's "new collective consciousness" that he used to describe the computational history of the Internet shutdown during the Egyptian revolution. Since VCC is the byproduct of the network's successful actions, then these actions must be timely, acute, rapid, domain-specific, and purpose-oriented to successfully achieve their goal. Before reaching a momentum of complexity, each collective behavior starts by a spark that triggers a chain of events leading to a crystallized stance of a tremendous amount of interactions. Thus, VCC is an emergent global pattern from these individual actions.

In 2012, the term virtual collective consciousness resurfaced and was brought to light after extending its applications to the Egyptian case and the whole social networking major impact on the success of the so-called Arab Spring. Moreover, the acronym VCC was suggested to identify the theoretical framework covering on-line behaviors leading to a virtual collective consciousness. Hence, online social networks have provided a new and faster way of establishing or modifying "collective consciousness" that was paramount to the 2011 uprisings in the Arab world.

== Theoretical underpinnings of VCC ==
Various theoretical references in fields ranging from sociology to computer science were mentioned in order to account for the key features that render the framework for a virtual collective consciousness. The following list is not exhaustive, but the references it contains are often highlighted:

- Émile Durkheim's collective representations are at the heart of VCC since collectivity taken decisions according to Durkheim's assumptions will approve or disapprove individuals' actions and help them eventually reach their final goal.
- Marshall McLuhan's global village: The shrinking of our big world to a small place called cyberspace is made possible by technological extensions of human consciousness.
- Carl Jung's collective unconscious: When a society witnesses significant changes, the anchoring of archetypal images (e.g., political leaders) seems to be deeply rooted in individuals' collective unconscious that is likely to bias their political choices. Individual memories of public events were also supposed to convey a "collective awareness" that can be subconsciously altered by the instantaneous spread of information through social networking around the world.
- Daniel Wegner's transactive memory (TM): social-networking platforms such as Facebook during the Tunisian revolution or Twitter during the Egyptian revolution served as placeholders of a VCC where information can be harnessed and steered to the highly specific revolutionary purpose. Although research on TM was originally limited to couples, small groups, and organizations, recent studies strongly suggest that an effective TM can operate on a very large scale too.
- James Surowiecki's wisdom of crowds
- Collective influence algorithm: The CI (Collective influence) algorithm is effective in finding influential nodes in a variety of networks, including social networks, communication networks, and biological networks. It has been used to identify influencers on social-media platforms, to identify key nodes in transportation networks, and to identify potential drug-targets in biological networks.

== Some illustrations of VCC ==
Besides the studied effect of social networking on the Tunisian and Egyptian revolutions, the former via Facebook and the latter via Twitter other applications were studied under the prism of VCC framework:

1. The Whitacre's virtual choir: A compelling example of the degree of autonomy and self-identity members of a spontaneously created network through a VCC is Eric Whitacre's unique musical project that involved a collection of singers performing remotely to create a virtual Choir. The effect of all the voices illustrated a genuine virtual collective empathy merging the artist's mind with all the singers through his silent conducting gestures.
2. The Harlem Shake dance:
3. The Bitcoin protocol: It was questioned whether or not the Bitcoin protocol can morph into virtual collective consciousness. The Byzantine generals problem was used as an analogy to understand the behavioral complexity of the community of Bitcoin's users.
4. Artificial Social Networking Intelligence (ASNI): refers to the application of artificial intelligence within social networking services and social media platforms. It encompasses various technologies and techniques used to automate, personalize, enhance, improve, and synchronize users' interactions and experiences within social networks. ASNI is expected to evolve rapidly, influencing how we interact online and shaping our digital experiences. Transparency, ethical considerations, media influence bias, and user control over data will be crucial to ensure responsible development and positive impact.

== See also ==
- Algorithmic curation
- Ambient awareness
- Collective consciousness
- Collective influence algorithm
- Collective intelligence
- Collective unconscious
- Crowdsourcing
- Hyperconnectivity
- Media intelligence
- Sentiment analysis
- Social cloud computing
- Social media intelligence
- Social media optimization
- Wisdom of the crowd
