= TickerTags =

American social data information company

- Founder: Chris Camillo
- Founded at: Dallas, Texas
- Website: https://www.tickertags.com

TickerTags is a social data intelligence company, located in the US.

The company was founded in 2015, by the American investor Chris Camillo.

== History ==
The company was founded in 2015, as a technology startup in Dallas, Texas. It was first launched as a free beta for entrepreneurs and regular people.

TickerTags gather data from Twitter and other social media channels, and use the information for generating predictive models. In 2016, the company made several predictions that forged its name, including accurate predictions about the results of the 2016 Brexit referendum and Netflix. Recently, it also made predictions regarding sales figures of Starbucks.

In 2018, TickerTags was acquired by M-Science.
