= Artificial intelligence in marketing =

Artificial intelligence marketing (AI marketing) is a form of marketing that uses artificial intelligence concepts and models such as machine learning, natural language processing, and computer vision to achieve marketing goals. The main difference between AI marketing and traditional forms of marketing resides in the reasoning, which is performed through a computer algorithm rather than a human.

Each form of marketing has a different technique to the core of the marketing theory. Traditional marketing directly focuses on the needs of consumers; meanwhile some believe the shift AI may cause will lead marketing agencies to manage consumer needs instead. AI is used in various digital marketing spaces, such as content marketing, email marketing, online advertisement (in combination with machine learning), social media marketing, affiliate marketing, and beyond.

== Historical development ==
AI in marketing has a long history, which goes all the way back to the 1980s. At this time, AI research was focusing on expert systems and robotics. Despite the initial research and the studies that were carried out, AI adoption remained limited. Research on it came to a stop for a while, until research was revived two decades later with the advancement in technology, the rise of big data, and a significant increase in computational power. Eventually, AI became very popular in the marketing world, and caught the eyes of many researchers as well as professionals. A large‐scale bibliometric study covering 1,580 peer‑reviewed papers published between 1982 and 2020 confirms that scholarly output on AI in marketing has surged since 2017, with Expert Systems with Applications emerging as the most prolific outlet.

Prior to the application of artificial Intelligence in marketing, there was something called "collaborative filtering". This was used as early as 1998 by Amazon, and one of the first ways companies predicted consumer behavior, which enabled millions of recommendations to different customers. Personalized recommender systems are now widely used, for example to suggest music on Spotify, or TV shows on Netflix. A big milestone in AI marketing happened in 2014, when programmatic ad buying gained much greater popularity. Marketing consists of numerous manual tasks such as researching target markets, insertion orders, and managing high budgets as well as prices. In order to cut costs, and remove the need for these tedious tasks, many companies started to automate the marketing process with AI. In 2015, Google released its most recent algorithm known as RankBrain, which opened new ways to analyzing search inquiries. It is used to accurately determine the reasoning and intent behind users searches.

Artificial intelligence is increasingly used in marketing to personalize user experiences and automate decision-making. For example, Netflix uses AI algorithms to recommend content based on viewing history, while Sephora employs chatbots to assist customers with product selection and availability. Programmatic advertising platforms like Google Ads leverage machine learning to optimize bidding strategies and target audiences more effectively. These applications demonstrate how AI enhances efficiency, engagement, and conversion rates across digital channels.

=== Artificial neural networks ===
An artificial neural network is a form of computer program modeled on the brain and nervous system of humans. Neural networks are composed of a series of interconnected processing neurons that function in unison to achieve certain outcomes. Using “human-like trial and error learning methods neural networks detect patterns existing within a data set ignoring data that is not significant while emphasizing the data which is most influential”.

From a marketing perspective, neural networks are a form of software tool used to assist in decision making. Neural networks are effective in gathering and extracting information from large data sources and have the ability to identify cause and effect within that data. These neural nets through the process of learning, identify relationships and connections between databases. Once knowledge has been accumulated, neural networks can be relied on to provide generalizations and can apply past knowledge and learning to a variety of situations.

Neural networks help fulfill the role of marketing companies through effectively aiding in market segmentation and measurement of performance while reducing costs and improving accuracy. Due to their learning ability, flexibility, adaption, and knowledge discovery, neural networks offer many advantages over traditional models. Neural networks can be used to assist in pattern classification, forecasting and marketing analysis.

== Tools and uses ==
Classification of customers can be facilitated through the neural network approach allowing companies to make informed marketing decisions. An example of this was employed by Spiegel Inc., a firm dealing in direct-mail operations that used neural networks to improve efficiencies. Using software developed by NeuralWare Inc., Spiegel identified the demographics of customers who had made a single purchase and those customers who had made repeat purchases. Neural networks were then able to identify the key patterns and consequently identify the customers that were most likely to repeat purchase. Understanding this information allowed Spiegel to streamline marketing efforts, and reduced costs.

Sales forecasting “is the process of estimating future events with the goal of providing benchmarks for monitoring actual performance and reducing uncertainty". Artificial intelligence techniques have emerged to facilitate the process of forecasting through increasing accuracy in the areas of demand for products, distribution, employee turnover, performance measurement, and inventory control. An example of forecasting using neural networks is the Airline Marketing Assistant/Tactician; an application developed by BehabHeuristics which allows for the forecasting of passenger demand and consequent seat allocation through neural networks. This system has been used by National air Canada and USAir.

Neural networks provide a useful alternative to traditional statistical models due to their reliability, time-saving characteristics and ability to recognize patterns from incomplete or noisy data. Examples of marketing analysis systems include the Target Marketing System developed by Churchull Systems for Veratex Corporation. This support system scans a market database to identify dormant customers allowing management to make decisions regarding which key customers to target. When performing marketing analysis, neural networks can assist in the gathering and processing of information ranging from consumer demographics and credit history to the purchase patterns of consumers.

Predictive analytics is a form of analytics involving the use of historical data and artificial intelligence algorithms to predict future trends and outcomes. It serves as a tool for anticipating and understanding user behavior based on patterns found in data. Predictive analytics uses artificial intelligence machine learning algorithms to recognize and predict patterns within data. Machine learning algorithms analyze the data, recognize patterns, and make predictions through continuous learning and adaptation. Predictive analytics is widely used across businesses and industries as a way to identify opportunities, avoid risks, and anticipate customer needs based on information derived from the analysis of user data. By analyzing historical customer data, artificial intelligence algorithms can deliver relevant and targeted marketing content. Recent systematic reviews show that generative large‑language models such as GPT‑3 and GPT‑4 are now routinely embedded in predictive‑analytics pipelines to mine unstructured market data and anticipate customer intent with greater precision.

Personalization engines use artificial intelligence and machine learning to provide content or advertisements that are relevant to the user. User data is gathered, which then gets processed with machine learning, and patterns and trends among the users are identified. Users with shared characteristics or behaviors are then segmented into groups, and the personalization engine adjusts content and advertisements to match each segment's preferences. Field evidence from consumer‑goods and electronics firms indicates that AI‑driven personalization can raise conversion rates and marketing ROI, although data‑governance and skills gaps remain key adoption challenges.

Behavioral targeting refers to the act of reaching out to a prospect or customer with communication based on implicit or explicit behavior shown by the customer's past behavior. Understanding behaviors is facilitated by marketing technology platforms such as web analytics, mobile analytics, social media analytics, and trigger-based marketing platforms. AI marketing provides a set of tools and techniques that enable behavioral targeting. Machine learning is used to improve the efficiency of behavioral targeting. Additionally, to prevent human bias in behavioral targeting at scale, artificial intelligence technologies are used. The most advanced form of behavioral targeting aided by artificial intelligence is called algorithmic marketing.

=== Automation efficiency ===
In marketing, automation use of software to automate marketing processes that would have otherwise been performed manually. It assists in effectively allowing processes such as customer segmentation, campaign management, and product promotion, to be undertaken at a more efficient rate. Marketing automation is a key component of customer relationship management (CRM). Companies are using systems that employ data-mining algorithms that analyze the customer database, giving further insight into the customer. This information may refer to socio-economic characteristics, earlier interactions with the customer, and information about the purchase history of the customer. Various systems have been designed to give organizations control over their data. Automation tools allow the system to monitor the performance of campaigns, making regular adjustments to the campaigns to improve response rates and to provide campaign performance tracking.

Distribution of products requires companies to access accurate data so they are able to respond to fluctuating trends in product demand. Automation processes are able to provide a comprehensive system that improves real-time monitoring and intelligent control. Amazon acquired Kiva Systems, the makers of the warehouse robot for $775 million in 2012. Prior to the purchase of the automated system, human employees would have to walk the enormous warehouse, tracking and retrieving books. The Kiva robots are able to undertake order fulfillment, product replenishment, as well as heavy lifting, thus increasing efficiency for the company.

== Application in marketing decision making ==
Marketing is a complex field of decision making which involves a large degree of both judgment and intuition on behalf of the marketer. The enormous increase in complexity that the individual decision-maker faces renders the decision-making process almost an impossible task. The marketing decision engine can help distill the noise. The generation of more efficient management procedures have been recognized as a necessity. The application of Artificial intelligence to decision making through a decision support system has the ability to aid the decision-maker in dealing with uncertainty in decision problems. Artificial intelligence techniques are increasingly extending decision support through analyzing trends; providing forecasts; reducing information overload; enabling communication required for collaborative decisions, and allowing for up-to-date information.

Organizations strive to satisfy the needs of the customers, paying specific attention to their desires. A consumer-orientated approach requires the production of goods and services that align with these needs. Understanding consumer behavior aids the marketer in making appropriate decisions. Thus, decision making is dependent on the marketing problem, the decision-maker, and the decision environment.

An expert system is a software program that combines the knowledge of experts in an attempt to solve problems through emulating the knowledge and reasoning procedures of the experts. Each expert system has the ability to process data, and then through reasoning, transform it into evaluations, judgments, and opinions, thus providing advice to specialized problems.

The use of an expert system that applies to the field of marketing is MARKEX (Market Expert). These Intelligent decision support systems act as consultants for marketers, supporting the decision-maker in different stages, specifically in the new product development process. The software provides a systematic analysis that uses various methods of forecasting, data analysis and multi-criteria decision making to select the most appropriate penetration strategy. BRANDFRAME is another example of a system developed to assist marketers in the decision-making process. The system supports a brand manager in terms of identifying the brand's attributes, retail channels, competing brands, targets, and budgets. New marketing input is fed into the system where BRANDFRAME analyses the data. Recommendations are made by the system in regard to marketing mix instruments, such as lowering the price or starting a sales promotional campaign.

== Analyzing social networks ==
A social network is a social arrangement of actors who make up a group, within a network; there can be an array of ties and nodes that exemplifies common occurrences within a network and common relationships. Liu (2011), describes a social network as, “the study of social entities (people in an organization, called actors), and their interactions and relationships. The interactions and relationships can be represented with a network or graph, where each vertex (or node) represents an actor and each link represents a relationship.” At the present time there is a growth in virtual social networking with the common emergence of social networks being replicated online, for example, social networking sites such as Twitter, Facebook and LinkedIn. From a marketing perspective, analysis and simulation of these networks can help to understand consumer behavior and opinion. The use of Agent-based social simulation techniques and data/opinion mining to collect social knowledge of networks can help a marketer to understand their market and segments within it.

=== Social computing ===
Social computing is the branch of technology that can be used by marketers to analyze social behaviors within networks and also allows for the creation of artificial social agents. Social computing provides the platform to create social-based software; some earlier examples of social computing are such systems that allow a user to extract social information such as contact information from email accounts e.g. addresses and companies titles from one's email using Conditional Random Field (CRFs) technology.

=== Data mining ===
Data mining involves searching the Web for existing information namely opinions and feelings that are posted online among social networks. “ This area of study is called opinion mining or sentiment analysis. It analyzes peoples opinions, appraisals, attitudes, and emotions toward entities, individuals, issues, events, topics, and their attributes”. However searching for this information and analysis of it can be a sizeable task, manually analyzing this information also presents the potential for researcher bias. Therefore, objective opinion analysis systems are suggested as a solution to this in the form of automated opinion mining and summarization systems. Marketers using this type of intelligence to make inferences about consumer opinion should be wary of what is called opinion spam, where fake opinions or reviews are posted in the web in order to influence potential consumers for or against a product or service.

Search engines are a common type of intelligence that seeks to learn what the user is interested in to present appropriate information. PageRank and HITS are examples of algorithms that search for information via hyperlinks; Google uses PageRank to control its search engine. Hyperlink based intelligence can be used to seek out web communities, which is described as ‘ a cluster of densely linked pages representing a group of people with a common interest’.

Centrality and prestige are types of measurement terms used to describe the level of common occurrences among a group of actors; the terms help to describe the level of influence an actor holds within a social network. Someone who has many ties within a network would be described as a ‘central’ or ‘prestige’ actor. Identifying these nodes within a social network is helpful for marketers to find out who are the trendsetters within social networks.

=== Social media AI-based tools ===
Ellett (2017) looked at the AI-based tools that are transforming social media markets. There are six areas of the social media marketing that are being impacted by AI: content creation, consumer intelligence, customer service, influencer marketing, content optimization, and competitive intelligence. One tool, Twizoo, uses AI to gather reviews from social networking sites about restaurants to help users find a place to eat. Twizoo had much success from the feedback of its users and expanded by launching “a widget where travel and hospitality websites could instantly bring those social media reviews to their own audiences” (Twizoo, 2017).

Influencer marketing has become a significant component of social media strategy. Many brands collaborate and sponsor popular social media users and try to promote their products to that social media user's followers. One company, InsightPool, uses AI to search through over 600 million influencers on social media to find the influencers who fit the brand's personality and target audience (Ellett, 2017). This can be an effective tool when searching for new influencers or a specific audience. It could also be cost-effective to find someone who is not famous (like Kardashians/Bachelorette cast) but could also influence a large audience and bring in sales

== Academic research trends ==
Bibliometric mappings of the field highlight five emergent clusters of inquiry ranging from trust‑based buyer-supplier relationships to social‑media sentiment mining and reveal still‑fragmented citation networks, suggesting that AI‑marketing scholarship is in an early, rapidly evolving stage.

== Ethics ==
The ethics of artificial intelligence marketing is an evolving area of study and debate. AI ethics encompasses many industries, fields of study, and social impacts. Major topics of ethical concern for AI marketing include privacy and algorithmic biases.

Privacy concerns from customers pertain to how technology companies like AI marketing and big data companies use consumer data. Questions that have been raised include how long consumer data is retained, how and to whom data is resold to (marketing, AI, data, private companies etc.), whether the data collected from one individual also contains data of other persons who did not wish for their data to be shared. In addition, the purpose of data collection is to enhance consumer experience. By using consumer data and combining that data with AI and marketing techniques, firms will have better understandings of what their customers want, and make customized products and services for their customers.

Algorithmic biases are errors in computer programs that have the potential to give unfair advantage to some and disadvantage others. Concerns for AI marketing is the possibility that artificial intelligence algorithms can be affected by existing biases from the programmers that designed the AI algorithms. Or the inability of an AI to detect biases because of its own calculations. On the other hand, there is the belief that AI bias in business is an inflated argument as business and marketing decisions are based on human-biases and decision-making. In part to further the shareholders' goals for their business and from decisions for what they intend to sell to attract specific consumers .

In March 2024, the SEC charged Delphia (USA) Inc. and Global Predictions Inc. for using false claims about their AI capabilities in marketing materials, highlighting the ethical challenges of AI marketing. Misleading AI marketing practices, such as "AI washing", undermine consumer trust and damage brand reputation. Research shows that leveraging data-driven approaches, including analyzing corporate disclosures and AI engagement metrics, improves the transparency and reliability of AI-powered marketing strategies.

== Collect, reason, act ==
AI marketing principles are based on the perception-reasoning-action cycle found in cognitive science. In the context of marketing, this cycle is adapted to form the collect, reason and act cycle.

1. Collect relates to all activities which aim to capture customer or prospect data; for example on social media platforms, where the platform will measure the duration of time a post was viewed. Whether taken online or offline, this data is then saved into customer or prospect databases.
2. Reason is the stage where data is transformed into information and, eventually, intelligence or insight. This is the phase where artificial intelligence and machine learning in particular play a key role.
3. With the intelligence gathered in the reason stage, one can then act. In the context of marketing, an act would be an attempt to influence a prospect or customer purchase decision using an incentive driven message. In an unsupervised model, the machine in question would take the decision and act according to the information it received in the collect stage.

== Emerging trends ==
=== AI marketing and user personalization ===
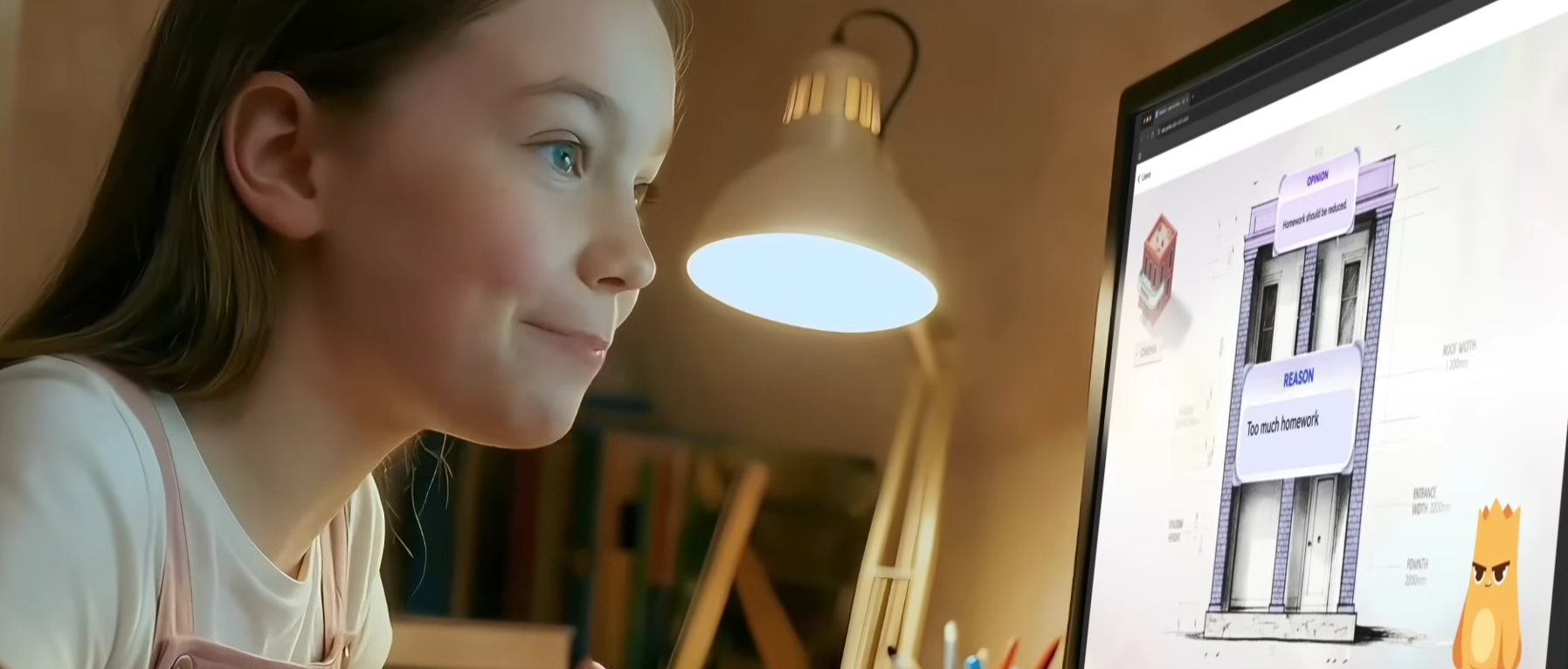
AI imagery is used in this image to market AI tutors.

AI's integration across many sectors is transforming innovation, improving efficiency and adaptability. AI's ability to analyze data and patterns enables it to produce hyper-personalized advertisements. For example, retail companies are doing everything they can to learn about us and our shopping habits. Target is one of the companies that has been smart about predictive analytics. Target AI models were able to predict if a woman was pregnant or not through their shopping habits. For instance, a woman suddenly starts buying unscented lotion and zinc vitamins which are signals that a woman is pregnant. Even if parents don't know that their daughter is pregnant, Target's algorithm can predict when she is due. Target alone estimates that they have made billions of dollars by targeting pregnant women. AI allows companies to understand customers buying habits and make personalized ads based on consumers interests. AI's ability to predict and understand customer choices in realtime helps companies tailor their content according to customers needs. This allows companies to reach the right consumers at the right time. With precise targeting businesses can make more profits, increase customer retention rate and address individual needs in real-time.

=== Integration of AI in digital assistants ===
Digital Assistants like Alexa, Siri, and Google Assistant have transformed the way customers interact with businesses. Users can ask queries to which the digital assistants respond, assisting the user, providing a personalized experience and increasing customer satisfaction. They also increase customer engagement as the voice integrated platforms are able to drive conversations and proactively suggest suitable services with the use of their natural language processing as well as machine learning models.

Chatbots are also leveraging AI, commonly being used by businesses to help provide customer support. AI-driven chatbots are able to use natural language processing to enhance communication with customers. This allows chatbots to anticipate the needs of the customer and take the appropriate actions, improving customer satisfaction. Chatbots enable businesses to have enhanced marketing communication with customers, as well as tailor the support experience depending on the needs of the customer.

=== AI in digital marketing ===
Artificial intelligence has transformed the digital marketing landscape by allowing businesses to capture large amounts of consumer data, leading to data-driven marketing strategies. Businesses like Amazon can utilize user's purchase, search, and viewing history on their platforms, to create customized user experiences. For example, relevant products can be advertised to the user to guide their purchasing behavior. AI algorithms are used to analyze all the available user data and ultimately create personalized recommendations.

Companies are increasingly using monitoring tools (such as Semrush's AI Visibility Toolkit and Enterprise AIO) to track how entities are referenced in LLM-generated answers, showing how large language models influence public knowledge.

=== Virtual influencers on social media ===
Virtual influencers are computer-generated digital characters powered by artificial intelligence that act like human social media influencers. They can post content, interact with followers, and promote brands online. Unlike human influencers, virtual influencers give brands complete creative control and lower the risk of reputational problems. In 2024, global spending on AI-driven virtual influencers reached over USD 4.6 billion and is expected to surpass USD 8 billion by 2025, showing rapid growth in sectors like fashion, beauty, and technology.

Virtual influencers work on social media platforms to engage audiences and build relationships similar to human influencers. They are not limited by physical presence or time, which allows for continuous online engagement. Research shows that many people respond to these AI personalities as if they were real, especially Generation Z, showing similar levels of trust, credibility, and emotional connection. Their success often depends on how much they appear like real humans and the way their stories are told to make them feel realistic and relatable.

Studies also warn about the uncanny valley effect, where virtual influencers that look too realistic may make some viewers feel uncomfortable. To avoid this, creators often balance realism with cartoonish features. Factors such as reliability, helpfulness, entertainment value, and humanlike traits influence how much followers engage with virtual influencers and how likely they are to buy promoted products.

There are also ethical concerns. Some audiences do not realize these virtual influencers are not real, which can lead to concerns about their honesty and transparency. Acceptance can vary by region: East Asian audiences tend to be more comfortable with AI-generated personas, while Western audiences often prefer clear disclosure. Models like the Virtual Influencer Trust and Engagement Model (VITEM) suggest that transparency, disclosure, and cultural context affect how audiences trust and interact with virtual influencers.

=== Agentic marketing ===
McKinsey describes agentic systems in marketing as software that coordinates decisions and actions across a workflow, with defined roles for people, rather than generative tools that complete a single task. The IAB Tech Lab's Agentic Advertising Management Protocols describe a media-buying version: a buyer agent and a seller agent turn a campaign brief into a media plan, negotiate, and confirm the transaction, using existing advertising standards. A related account distinguishes the practice from rules-based marketing automation. Agents pursue a goal across channels and budgets, monitor signals, and recommend a change that a person accepts or discards before it is sent to an advertising platform, instead of firing a preset action when a condition is met.

An agent is only as reliable as the score it is told to improve. Seven-day last-click attribution predicted incremental conversions per dollar far worse than a model trained on randomized advertising tests (an out-of-sample R^{2} of 0.19, compared with 0.88).

== See also ==
- Targeted advertising
- Online advertising
- Marketing intelligence
- Media intelligence
- Content intelligence
- Customer data platform
- Market segmentation § Statistical techniques used in segmentation
