= Jonathan Harris (artist) =

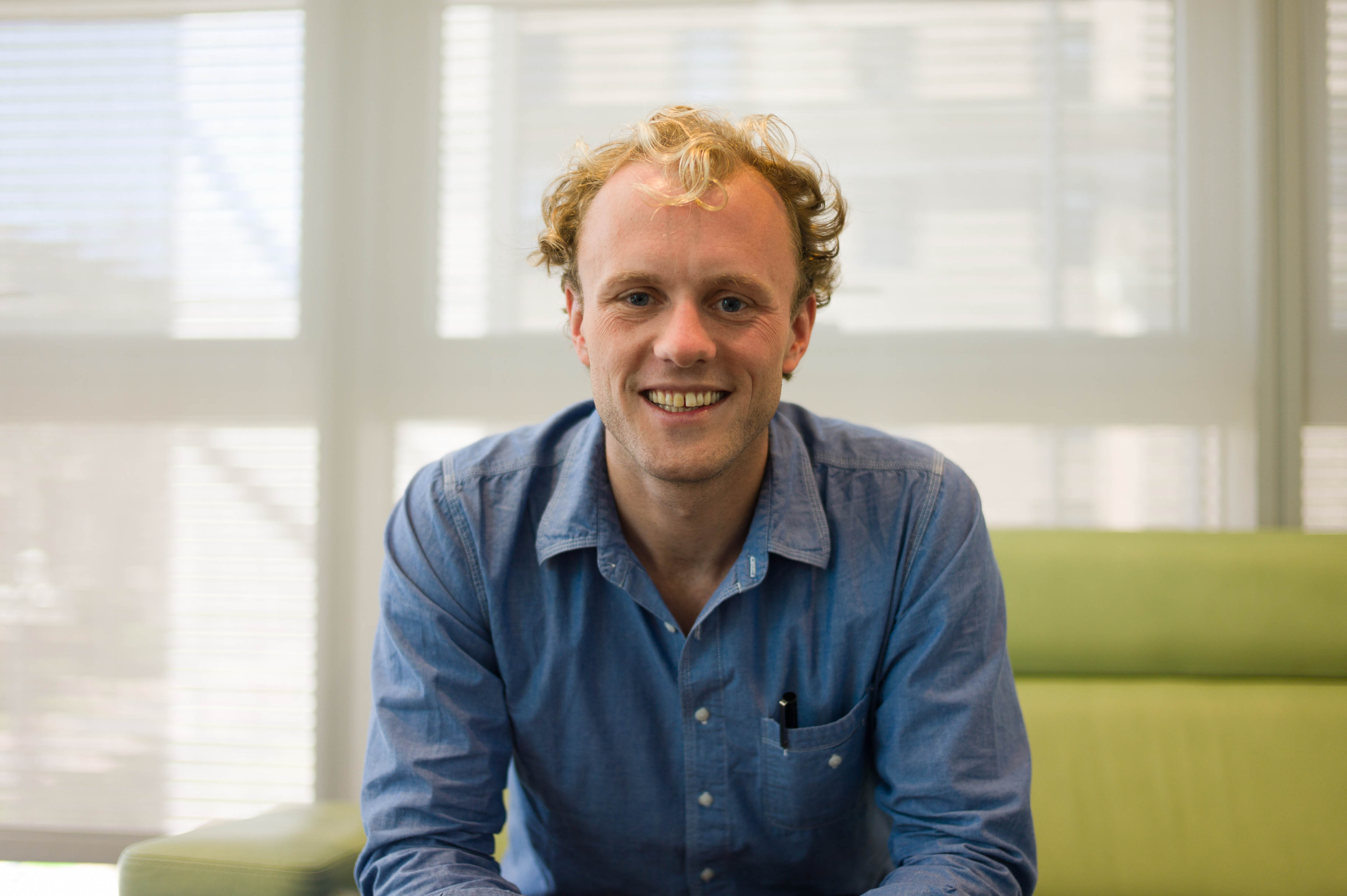
Jonathan Harris in 2012

Jonathan Jennings Harris (born August 27, 1979, in Burlington, Vermont) is an American artist and computer scientist, known for his work with data visualization, interactive documentary, and ritual.

== Work ==
Harris is the co-creator (with Sep Kamvar) of We Feel Fine, a search engine for human emotions. The project was named by AIGA one of the most influential design works of the last century, and later became a book (We Feel Fine: An Almanac of Human Emotion) published by Scribner in 2009.

In 2006, Harris was commissioned by Yahoo! to create the Yahoo! Time Capsule, which sought to record a digital fingerprint of the world at that time. In 2007, he spent two weeks living with an Iñupiat Eskimo family during their traditional spring whale hunt in Utqiagvik, Alaska (formerly Barrow), producing the interactive documentary, The Whale Hunt. In 2008, he and Kamvar were commissioned by The Museum of Modern Art to create the interactive installation, I Want You To Want Me, visualizing thousands of online dating profiles as colorful balloons. The project was installed at the museum on Valentine's Day 2008.

In 2011, Harris released Cowbird, a free digital storytelling platform with the mission of creating a "public library of human experience." The project was active until 2017, when it was closed due to "growing awareness" of "attention economies and screen addiction."

From 2015 to 2021, Harris worked on a series of personal rituals at High Acres Farm, his family's ancestral land in Shelburne, Vermont—ultimately producing a set of 21 short films, released in 2022 as In Fragments.

Since 2024, he has been creating a series of "illuminated works for all ages" published via Sunlight Papers.

== Education ==
Harris attended St. Bernard's School in New York City and Deerfield Academy in Massachusetts. He received his BA in computer science from Princeton University, where he studied with Brian Kernighan and Emmet Gowin. He also received a fellowship at the Fabrica Research Center in Italy.

== Honors ==
Harris was named a "Young Global Leader" by the World Economic Forum in 2009. His projects have been widely exhibited around the world, and are in the permanent collection of the Museum of Modern Art in New York, and the Museum of Fine Arts, Houston. In 2017, he was the Guest of Honor at the IDFA Film Festival in Amsterdam, where he offered a Master Talk summarizing his life and work.
