= Chris Camillo =

Founder and CEO of Ticker-Tags

- Occupation: Entrepreneur
- Organization: TickerTags

Chris Camillo is an American author, investor and entrepreneur. He is the founder and CEO of TickerTags, a social data intelligence company, known for predicting the Brexit result in 2016. In 2020, he was featured in Jack Schwager's book Unknown Market Wizards: The best traders you've never heard of.

== Career ==
Chris Camillo started his investing career in 2007, when he invested 20,000 USD in the stock market, and produced more than $2 million in investment returns during the following three-year period. In 2014, an independent accountant's report of his personal investment returns for the period of December 1, 2006, through November 30, 2013, was publicly published documenting seven years of 84% averaging portfolio returns.

In 2011, he wrote the book Laughing at Wall Street: How I Beat the Pros at Investing, published by St. Martin Press, in which he revealed some of his strategies and insights.

In 2015, and after two years of development, Chris launched his social data tool TickerTags, and a company with the same name. TickerTags is a social listening platform that gives investors the ability to monitor the conversation around keywords pertinent to publicly traded securities and other investable assets on platforms like Twitter.

== Social arbitrage and Unknown Market Wizards ==
Camillo calls his investing approach "social arbitrage",which he describes as observational investing: spotting social trends and cultural shifts in everyday life, and in social media conversation, before Wall Street prices them in. The chapter on him in Jack Schwager's Unknown Market Wizards is titled "Neither", because his method is neither fundamental nor technical analysis. Business press reported in 2025 that he had turned a stake of about $84,000 into $42 million over fifteen years using the strategy, and International Business Times said Schwager documented a 77% average annual compounded return over roughly fifteen years.

== Other ventures and media ==
Before investing full time, Camillo worked as an operating executive and early-stage investor and advisor in technology businesses; Capital Factory's mentor profile lists exits including Research Now, eCarList, Order My Gear and TickerTags. He is a co-host of the investing show Dumb Money TV (also known as DumbMoney.tv), and a podcast and conference speaker.
