= Marketing intelligence =

Marketing term

Marketing intelligence (MI) is the everyday information relevant to a company's markets, gathered and analyzed specifically for the purpose of accurate and confident decision-making in determining market opportunity, market penetration strategy, and market development metrics. Gartner defines Marketing intelligence as "a category of marketing dashboard tools that an organization uses to gather and analyze data to determine its market opportunities, market penetration strategy and market development metrics."

== Concept ==
Marketing intelligence determines the intelligence needed, collects it by searching the environment, and delivers it to marketing managers who need it. Marketing intelligence software can be deployed using an on-premises or software as a service (SaaS, or cloud-based) model. These systems take data from disparate data sources, like web analytics, business intelligence, call center, and sales data, which often come in separate reports, and put them into a single environment. In order to collect marketing intelligence, marketing managers must be in constant touch with relevant books, newspapers, and trade publications. They must talk to various stakeholders like customers, distributors, and suppliers. In addition to this, they must also monitor social media platforms and engage in online discussions. Marketing managers can design reports that correlate and visualize data coming from a variety of departments and sources (even, in some cases, external data). This allows them to see current key performance indicators in real-time (or as quickly as sources provide data) and analyze trends, rather than wait for analysts to deliver periodic reports.

Marketing intelligence systems are designed to be used by marketing managers and are often viewed by employees throughout an organization. Notable systems on the market include Contify, Uptime, Leadtime, Pardot, Marketo, and Hubspot. They may have user interfaces that more closely resemble consumer software than the software around individual data sources, which are designed for use by analysts. Business intelligence, for example, can collect highly accurate, timely, granular data, but often requires IT support to build and edit custom reports.

Organizationally, marketing intelligence can be the name of the department that performs both the market intelligence and competitor analysis roles. Business intelligence of any kind may also be their responsibility, in tandem with (or solely performed by) the Finance department, for measuring market share and setting growth targets, the mergers and acquisitions group for exploring acquisition opportunities, the legal department to protect the organization's assets or research and development for cross-company comparison of innovation trends and the discovery of opportunities through innovative differentiation.

== Steps ==
With the following steps being applied, a company's marketing intelligence system will prove to be beneficial to its effective functioning.

1. Train and Motivate Sales Force: A company's sales force can be an excellent source of information about the current trends in the market. They are the "intelligence gatherers" for the company. The acquired facts can be regarding the company's market offerings, whether any improvements are required or not or is there any opportunity for new products, etc. It can also provide a credible source to know about competitor activities, consumers, distributors, and retailers.
2. Motivate Distributors, retailers, and other intermediaries to pass along important intelligence: Specialists are hired by companies to gather marketing intelligence. To measure production quality, employee behavior toward customers, and the quality of facilities being provided; retailers and service providers send mystery shoppers. Firms can also assess the quality of customer experience with the shops with the use of mystery shoppers.
3. Network Externally: Every firm must monitor its competitors. Competitive intelligence describes the broader discipline of researching, analyzing and formulating data and information from the entire competitive environment of any organization. This can be done by purchasing the competitor's products, checking the advertising campaigns, the press media coverage, reading their published reports, etc. Competitive intelligence must be legal and ethical.
4. Set up a customer advisory panel: Companies can set up panels consisting of customers. They can be the company's largest customers or representatives of customers or the most outspoken customers. Many business schools set up panels of alumni who provide their knowledge and expertise and help constitute the course curriculum.
5. Optimal usage of Government data resources: Governments of almost all countries publish reports regarding population trends, demographic characteristics, agricultural production, and a lot of other such data. All this data must be or can be referred to as base data. It can help in planning and formulating policies for the companies.
6. Information bought from external suppliers: Certain agencies sell data that can be useful to other companies. For example, television channels will require information on the viewership, ratings of TV programs, etc. An agency that calculates this information and generates this data will provide it to companies that need it.
7. Collect Competitive Intelligence through online customer feedback: The customer's view of a product is essential for any company. Ultimately it's the customer who's buying the product. Hence customer feedback must be taken. Online platforms like chat rooms, blogs, discussion forums, and customer review boards can be used to generate customer feedback. This enables the firm to understand customer experiences and impressions. It becomes easier for companies to apply a structured system to do so as it can then scan out the relevant messages without much trouble.

== See also ==
- Content intelligence
- Competitive intelligence
- Customer data platform
- Market intelligence
- Marketing and artificial intelligence
- Media intelligence
