= Content intelligence =

Content intelligence is a method that uses artificial intelligence systems and software algorithms to analyze data content. AI analyzes customer and client behavior, while the software processes vast amounts of data to provide insights into content trends, efficiency, and sentiment analysis.

== See also ==
- Content moderation
- Customer Data Platform
- Marketing and artificial intelligence
- Marketing intelligence
- Media intelligence
