= Social project management =

Social project management is a non-traditional way of organizing projects and performing project management. It is, in its simplest form, the outcome of the application of the Social networking (i.e. Facebook) paradigm to the context of project ecosystems, as a continued response to the movement toward distributed, virtual teams. Distributed virtual teams lose significant communication value normally present when groups are collocated. Because of this, social project management is motivated by a philosophy of the maximizing of open, and continuous communication, both inside and outside the team. Because it is a response to new organizing structures that require technologically mediated communications, Social Project Management is most often enabled by the use of Collaborative software inspired by social media. This paradigm enables the project work to be published as activity stream and publicized via the integration with the social network of an organization. Social project management embraces both the historical best practices of Project management, and the open collaboration of Web 2.0.

While Project management 2.0 embraced a philosophical shift away from centralized command and control and focused strongly on the egalitarian collaboration of a team, social project management recognizes the important role of the project manager, especially on large projects. Additionally, while Project management 2.0 minimized the importance of computer-supported scheduling, social project management recognizes that while many projects can be performed using emergent planning and control, large, enterprise projects require centralized control accompanied by seamless collaboration.

== History ==
The concept of social project management emerged during 2008 when some developers of project management tools started to use the term to differentiate between traditional project management tools and tools for Agile software development.

While some have used the terminology Project Management 2.0 and social project management interchangeably, they exhibit significant differences in practice.

Communigram-NET, a network of excellence on social project management, has been set up since November 2011.

== Key concepts (how social project management differs from Project Management 2.0) ==
Social business software(Social Business software), of which social project management is a subset, powers business performance based upon its ability to assist teams in managing exceptions. Because it is based on the concepts of Social Business Software in general, Social Project Management software is differentiated from other collaborative project software by three key areas of functionality:

First, social project management software is embedded into the social network of the larger organization. One goal that Project management 2.0 systems realized was the need to create project-based collaboration systems. However, PM2.0 tools were often adopted at the project level, and not the enterprise level. This led to the situation where team members on several projects might have to use multiple tools for collaboration, depending on what project they were working on at that moment. Additionally, because of the fragmented nature of the tools used, little visibility existed to any person outside of the project team.

Social project management is based upon the philosophy that the project team is one part of an integrated whole, and that valuable, relevant and unique abilities and knowledge exist within the larger organization. For this reason, Social Project Management systems are integrated into the collaborative platform(s) of an organization, so that communication can proceed outside the project boundaries.

Second, social project management software is organized around a formal project schedule, and all activities and collaborative functionality are linked to this schedule.

While PM 2.0 tools stressed collaboration, many tools provided little to no actual project management capabilities. While this often worked very well for smaller projects, especially ones with distributed teams, it could not scale to enterprise-level projects.

Social project management embraces the vision of seamless online collaboration within a project team, but also provides for the use of rigorous project management techniques.

Third, social project management software provides an activity stream that allows the team, and its stakeholders to build ambient awareness of the project activity and status.

This is what makes social project management "social". The concept of Ambient awareness enables distributed teams to build awareness in ways that previously was restricted to teams that were collocated. Using the Activity Stream paradigm, large distributed teams are provided with a constant stream of information regarding the project. While in the past, this kind of continuous communication might have been posited to create Information Overload, this stream of small bits of information has been shown to create significant alignment between people working together, without overload.

== See also ==
- Activity stream
- Ambient awareness
- Project management,Virtual project management
- Social intelligence
- Virtual team
