= Empire.Kred =

Social media platform

Empire.Kred (formerly Empire Avenue)
- Company type: Private
- Website type: Social network service
- Available in: English
- Founded: Edmonton, Alberta, Canada (2009)
- Headquarters: San Francisco, California, USA
- Creators: Duleepa Wijayawardhana, Niall Brown, Michael Mannion
- Key people: Duleepa Wijayawardhana (Co-Founder, CEO), Niall Brown (Co-Founder), Michael Mannion (Co-Founder)
- Website: empire.kred
- Registration: Required
- Launched: February 23, 2010
- Current status: Not Active as of November 10, 2024 https://play.empire.kred/

Empire.Kred, formerly Empire Avenue, was a social media platform launched around 2010, operating primarily as a virtual "social stock market". On the platform, users could buy and sell virtual shares in other users, with share prices intended to reflect an individual's online influence and social media activity. Founded in Canada by Duleepa Wijayawardhana, Michael Mannion, and Niall Brown, some of whom had prior experience at companies like BioWare and Electronic Arts, the platform aimed to quantify the value generated by users on various social networks. It utilized a virtual currency called "Eaves" for transactions and connected to external platforms like Facebook, Twitter, and others to gauge user activity.

Empire Avenue garnered attention as an early experiment in quantifying social influence and gamifying social networking, attracting both interest and significant criticism before eventually being acquired by PeopleBrowsr in 2015 and rebranded as Empire.Kred.

Empire.Kred ceased operations and is no longer active with a message that "After 15 years of building, growth and community, the sun has set on the Empire"

== History ==
=== Origins and conception ===
The concept for Empire Avenue emerged from discussions between its founders—Duleepa Wijayawardhana, Michael Mannion, and Niall Brown—regarding the nature of "value" on the internet, particularly concerning content generated on social media platforms like Facebook and Twitter. They posited that purely algorithmic methods were insufficient to capture this value and envisioned a crowd-sourced market where value could be determined through collective user actions.

The three founders had initially met years earlier while attending Memorial University in St. John's, Newfoundland, Canada. Fifteen years later, having pursued different career paths, they reconnected in Montreal and began developing the idea for Empire Avenue. Their diverse professional backgrounds were also instrumental: Wijayawardhana had experience in the video game industry with BioWare (developer of titles like Mass Effect and Dragon Age) and later with the database company MySQL AB (acquired by Sun Microsystems, then Oracle); Mannion held a Post-Doctorate in Chemistry from Harvard; and Brown had an Arts background. They cited this blend of expertise in gaming, data management, science, and humanities potentially contributed to the platform's multifaceted design, which combined elements of social networking, game mechanics, and data analytics. Wijayawardhana cited the acquisitions of his previous company, MySQL AB, as a factor motivating him to seek a unique entrepreneurial challenge with Empire Avenue. The core vision was to recognize the value created by individuals online and empower these "Influencers" to benefit directly from their content and reach, rather than value accruing solely to large platforms.

=== Early development and beta phases ===
Empire Avenue began with a bootstrapping phase, founded by Wijayawardhana, Mannion, and Brown.4 By May 2010, the core team had grown to eight individuals possessing a range of skills including UI/UX design, legal expertise, social media marketing, mathematics, and programming. The company adopted an iterative development strategy, starting with a closed beta test among friends and family to refine the platform. This was followed by an "Invite Beta" phase, allowing controlled growth while actively incorporating community feedback into the development process. A notable event during this early period was the "Big Reset," where all user share prices were reset as the platform transitioned from the closed beta to the invite-only stage.

Even in its beta phase, the platform garnered positive attention, gaining 1,700 users rapidly and briefly trending on Twitter in Canada. By August 2010, while still in beta, Empire Avenue had attracted over 15,000 registered users and businesses from more than 95 countries. Significant virtual economic activity was already occurring, with over 750,000 virtual share trades conducted, representing a total value exceeding half a billion Eaves, the platform's virtual currency.

=== Public launch and initial growth ===
Empire Avenue transitioned from its invite-only beta to a public launch around July 28, 2010, with some tech blogs offering early invites shortly before the official opening. At launch, the platform allowed users to connect their accounts from Twitter, Flickr, Facebook, and personal blogs via RSS feeds, using activity on these networks to calculate user share prices. The platform quickly demonstrated international appeal, building on its beta user base from over 95 countries and later reporting users in over 190 countries. Early reports highlighted interest from specific international communities, such as users in Chile.

=== Funding founds ===
Empire Avenue secured funding through at least two distinct rounds:

1. Seed funding: An initial seed investment was raised from a private group of angel investors led by Boris Wertz of W Media Ventures (later Wertz Media Ventures). Announced in August 2010, these funds were earmarked for accelerating site development, launching the planned "Avenue Rewards" program and advertising platform, and funding marketing initiatives to grow the user base.
2. Series A funding: In August 2011, the company announced it had raised $1.2 million in a funding round led by venture capital firm Crosslink Capital. Significant participation came from iNovia Capital, along with several prominent individual investors, including BioWare co-founders Drs. Ray Muzyka and Greg Zeschuk, Ben Narasin, TriplePoint Capital, former THQ and Take-Two executive Jeff Lapin, Kevin Swan, and Dr. Boris Wertz, who reinvested. The stated purpose of this funding was to expand the team and continue platform development.

Empire Avenue funding summary
| Round Type | Date Announced | Amount Raised | Lead Investors | Notable Participating Investors |
|---|---|---|---|---|
| Seed | Aug 13, 2010 | Undisclosed | Boris Wertz (W Media) | Angel Group |
| Series A | Aug 17, 2011 | $1.2 Million | Crosslink Capital | iNovia Capital, Ray Muzyka, Greg Zeschuk, Ben Narasin, TriplePoint Capital, Jeff Lapin, Kevin Swan, Boris Wertz (Wertz Media) |

=== SOPA protest involvement ===
Empire Avenue was reported to be among Canadian companies participating in protests against the proposed Stop Online Piracy Act (SOPA) legislation in the United States in late 2011.This action aligned the company with other internet firms and digital rights advocates opposing the controversial bill.

=== Acquisition and rebranding to Empire.Kred ===
In 2015, Empire Avenue was acquired by PeopleBrowsr, whose Kred product was also focused on measuring online influence. Following the acquisition, the platform was rebranded and integrated into what became known as Empire.Kred.

== Concept and gameplay ==
=== Core premise: the Social Stock Market ===
The fundamental concept behind Empire Avenue was its operation as a "Social Media Exchange" or "influence stock market". Each registered user was assigned a virtual share price, analogous to a stock price for a company. This price was designed to reflect the user's online activity, reach, engagement, and overall influence across various connected social media platforms. The platform used proprietary algorithms to calculate this value, taking into account factors from external networks as well as trading activity within Empire Avenue itself—how frequently a user's shares were bought or sold. The exact formula remained confidential.

A key element of the concept was the idea of a "crowd-sourced market". Rather than relying solely on algorithms, the platform aimed for value to be co-determined by the collective investment decisions of its users. Buying shares in someone signified belief in their current or future influence, adding a human judgment layer to the valuation process. Users were incentivized to increase their own value by encouraging others to invest in them.

=== Virtual currency: Eaves ===
The platform's internal economy revolved around a virtual currency called "Eaves". Users utilized Eaves for various activities:

- Investing: Buying virtual shares in other users.
- Advertising: Purchasing in-game advertisements to promote their own profile or encourage investment.
- Upgrades: Spending on account enhancements or virtual goods.

Eaves could be earned through several mechanisms:

- Dividends: Shareholders received Eaves payouts based on the online activity and engagement of the individuals whose shares they held. The more active the investee, the higher the potential dividend for their shareholders.
- Capital gains: Selling shares at a price higher than the purchase price.
- Platform actions: Completing specific tasks, potentially including engaging with advertisements (cost-per-action features were available for brands).
- Initial allocation: New users received a starting amount of Eaves.
- Recruitment: Bringing new users to the platform was suggested as a primary way to inject new currency into the system, according to critics.
- Direct purchase: The company's business model included the sale of virtual currency.

The founders expressed a vision for Eaves to eventually connect to real-world rewards, creating a "self-sustaining online economy". However, the extent to which this vision was realized during the Empire Avenue phase is unclear from the available sources.

=== Social network integration ===
Empire Avenue's valuation mechanism was heavily dependent on integrating with external social media platforms. Initially, it connected with Twitter, Flickr, Facebook, and blogs via RSS feeds. Over time, the range of integrated platforms expanded to include YouTube, LinkedIn, Foursquare, and Instagram. The platform analyzed user activity, engagement levels, and network size on these connected services to help determine the user's virtual share price.

A useful feature noted by reviewers was that Empire Avenue provided scores or indicators of activity for each connected network individually. This allowed users to see not just an overall influence score, but also on which specific platforms another user was most active, potentially guiding more effective interaction.

=== Gamification elements ===
Empire Avenue heavily incorporated game mechanics to drive user engagement and make the complex system more approachable.

Key gamification elements included:

- Achievements: The platform featured unlockable achievements, similar in concept to Xbox achievements or Foursquare badges, awarded for performing various actions within the site. These were designed to be earned relatively quickly in the early stages of use to encourage exploration.
- Trading mechanics: The core act of buying and selling shares, watching prices fluctuate, and earning dividends functioned as a central game loop.
- Rankings and leaderboards: Users could track their standing through "Indexes," which provided rankings within specific fields of interest or communities.
- Helper characters/features: To aid understanding, the platform included virtual "statisticians" and "bankers" who could provide insights into why a user's score was changing.

This strong emphasis on game mechanics positioned Empire Avenue somewhere between a social utility and a social game. While intended to boost engagement, this duality may have contributed to user confusion about the platform's primary purpose. Some users treated it purely as a game, focusing on maximizing their Eaves and share price through game strategies, while others attempted to use it as a serious tool for networking and influence measurement. This potential conflict in user goals and understanding, stemming from the blend of utility features and game mechanics, likely impacted the overall user experience and the platform's ability to clearly define its value proposition for everyone.

== Platform features ==
=== User profiles and valuation ===
User profiles served as the central hub, displaying the user's current virtual share price, a list of connected social networks, and potentially personal interests imported from platforms like Facebook. Profiles also likely included activity feeds showing recent platform actions or social media updates. Empire Avenue provided users with various metrics and statistics intended to help them understand the value derived from their online activities and network connections.

=== Community features ===
Beyond the stock market mechanics, Empire Avenue included features designed to foster interaction and community:

- Communities: Dedicated spaces, called "Empire Avenue Communities," allowed for private or public discussions among users with shared interests.
- Interaction tools: Users could engage with each other through content streams, comments, "shout-outs" (public messages), and private notes.
- Chat: An active chat room was available, facilitating real-time conversation among users.

These features aimed to support the platform's goal of creating "value relationships," where connections were formed not just through investment but also through direct communication and shared interests.

=== Features for brands ===
Empire Avenue actively courted brands and businesses, offering specific features to facilitate their participation: Company Accounts: Brands could create verified business profiles to establish an official presence.

- Leveraging social media: Companies could connect their existing social media accounts (Facebook, Twitter, etc.), allowing their engagement on those platforms to influence their Empire Avenue profile and potentially benefit their virtual shareholders.
- Influencer identification: The platform offered tools and analytics that could help brands identify influential users within specific demographics or interest groups.
- Engagement and rewards: Brands could interact with users via comments, shout-outs, and other tools. They could also deploy virtual branded goods, purchasable or earnable with Eaves, as a form of engagement or reward. Cost-per-action advertising was possible, where users earned Eaves for activities like watching brand commercials. Brands could also theoretically reward fans by purchasing their shares within the game.

These features positioned Empire Avenue as a potential platform for influencer marketing, brand engagement, and gaining intelligence on social media performance.

=== API and third-party development ===
Empire Avenue provided an open Application Programming Interface (API), allowing external developers to build applications and integrations. Examples cited included a third-party iPhone application.

== Business model ==
=== Revenue streams ===
Empire Avenue generated revenue through several channels:

- Sale of virtual currency: Selling Eaves directly to users for real money was a core part of the business model.1 This was likely necessary for users who exhausted their initial allocation or earnings, especially given the economic structure critiqued by some observers.
- Brand services: Features offered to brands, such as verified accounts, and virtual goods deployment represented another revenue stream.
- Transaction fees: A 5% "house cut" was reportedly taken on every transaction within the platform. While primarily functioning as a currency sink within the virtual economy, this mechanism also allowed the depletion of currency to facilitate the sale of virtual currency.

=== Value proposition ===
The platform offered distinct value propositions to its primary user groups:

- For individual users: At the time, Empire Avenue provided a novel, gamified experience for understanding and potentially increasing one's perceived online influence. It offered tools for discovering and connecting with influential individuals based on investment activity and shared interests. The platform also held out the promise of earning virtual rewards (Eaves) and, potentially, future real-world benefits.
- For brands: The platform was presented as a tool to identify key online influencers, engage directly with consumers and advocates, run targeted marketing campaigns using virtual goods or rewards, and gain insights into social media engagement patterns and effectiveness. It aimed to be a bridge connecting brands with relevant online communities and influential voices.

== Reception and analysis ==
=== Media coverage and initial reviews ===
Empire Avenue generated considerable buzz upon its launch, attracting media attention for its unique "social stock market" concept where individuals themselves were the traded commodity. Coverage appeared across various media types, including technology publications, gaming industry outlets, business and marketing focused sites, and international news sources. It was also featured in lists highlighting emerging or "hot" social networking sites.

Initial reviews often expressed intrigue and found the core game loop of buying and selling shares based on social influence to be fun. However, reviewers also noted that the platform felt somewhat incomplete at launch, particularly regarding the connection between in-game success (accumulating Eaves) and tangible, real-world value, which was part of the long-term vision but not fully implemented initially.

=== User experience and engagement ===
User experiences with Empire Avenue appeared to have been mixed at the launch and before its sale. The platform succeeded in building a passionate and highly engaged user base, with some users forming dedicated groups to network and strategize within the game. The gamified elements, particularly the trading and score tracking, could be compelling for users interested in quantifying and improving their social media standing. One reviewer highlighted its utility in identifying the specific social networks where individuals were most active, allowing for more targeted engagement off-platform.

However, a significant and recurring criticism concerned the platform's complexity and confusing user interface. New users reportedly found the multitude of features and information overwhelming, creating a steep learning curve. The Empire Avenue team acknowledged this issue and was reportedly working on simplifying the interface. Furthermore, the platform's dual nature as both a game and a networking tool led to differing usage patterns and potential friction. Users focused solely on game mechanics (e.g., aggressive self-promotion to boost share price) were sometimes seen as disruptive or "spammy" by those attempting to use the platform for genuine networking. This tension underscored the challenge Empire Avenue faced in balancing its gamification elements with its utility goals.

=== Criticism and controversies ===
Beyond usability issues, Empire Avenue faced more fundamental criticisms:

- "Social pyramid scheme" critique: A prominent critique, notably articulated by Christopher S. Penn in a 2011 blog post, labeled Empire Avenue a "social pyramid scheme game". This argument centered on the platform's virtual economy structure. Penn argued that the primary sources of new Eaves entering the system were limited (initial user allocations, ad engagement, direct purchase) and that significant currency injection relied heavily on recruiting new members who brought in starter cash. Compounding this was the reported 5% "house cut" on all transactions, which constantly removed currency from circulation. The critique suggested that without continuous exponential growth in users (or significant ongoing Eaves purchases), the economy would inevitably contract, making it increasingly difficult for users to profit or even break even (requiring >10% gain on trades to overcome the buy/sell fees). This structure, the argument went, primarily benefited early adopters or those adept at recruitment, mirroring pyramid scheme dynamics, while potentially exploiting users' desire for social validation through metrics. This line of criticism attacked the core economic engine of the platform, questioning its long-term sustainability and ethical foundation, representing a more profound challenge than critiques focused merely on features or usability.
- Economic model sustainability: Related to the pyramid scheme critique were broader questions about the long-term viability of the Eaves economy, given its reliance on new user influx or direct currency purchases to counteract the deflationary pressure of the transaction fees.
- Brand engagement challenges: As noted earlier, analysts pointed out several hurdles for brands using the platform. These included the difficulty in demonstrating clear ROI in terms of sales or cost reduction, the potential for users to "game the system" rather than engage authentically, uncertainty about why consumers would invest in brand shares (affinity vs. speculation), and a lack of robust features for brands to directly reward their virtual shareholders beyond potential share price increases.

== GamrRank pivot/side project ==
Around late 2012, the team at Empire Avenue launched GamrRank, a separate but related venture focused specifically on the gaming community. GamrRank applied similar concepts of social ranking and engagement tracking to gamers and their activities across various gaming platforms and communities.

== Legacy ==
The Empire Avenue experiment, including its continuation as Empire.Kred, represents a notable early attempt to quantify and gamify social media influence. It explored complex ideas about online value creation, crowd-sourced valuation, and the potential for virtual economies tied to social activity. While facing significant challenges related to usability, economic sustainability, and defining its core value proposition, it spurred discussion about influence measurement and provided a unique, albeit controversial, social gaming experience. Its legacy lies in its contribution to the ongoing exploration of how to measure and leverage social capital online, foreshadowing later developments in influencer marketing platforms and social media analytics, even as its own model faced scrutiny.

== See also ==
- Investment Game
