= Ambient awareness =

Term used to describe a form of peripheral social awareness

Ambient awareness (AmA) is a term used by social scientists to describe a form of peripheral social awareness through social media. This awareness is propagated from relatively constant contact with one's friends and colleagues via social networking platforms on the Internet. The term essentially defines the sort of omnipresent knowledge one experiences by being a regular user of these media outlets that allow a constant connection with one's social circle.

According to Clive Thompson of The New York Times, ambient awareness is "very much like being physically near someone and picking up on mood through the little things; body language, sighs, stray comments". Academic Andreas Kaplan defines ambient awareness as "awareness created through regular and constant reception, and/or exchange of information fragments through social media". Two friends who regularly follow one another's digital information can already be aware of each other's lives without actually being physically present to have had a conversation.

== Social ==
Socially speaking, ambient awareness and social media are products of the new generations who are being born or growing up in the digital age, starting circa 1998 and running to current times. Social media is personal media (what you're doing in the moment, how you feel, a picture of where you are) combined with social communication. Social media is the lattice work for ambient awareness. Without social media the state of ambient awareness cannot exist.

Artificial Social Networking Intelligence (ASNI) refers to the application of artificial intelligence within social networking services and social media platforms. It encompasses various technologies and techniques used to automate, personalize, enhance, improve, and synchronize user's interactions and experiences within social networks. ASNI is expected to evolve rapidly, influencing how we interact online and shaping their digital experiences. Transparency, ethical considerations, media influence bias, and user control over data will be crucial to ensure responsible development and positive impact.

A significant feature of social media is that it is created by those who also consume it. Mostly, those participating in this phenomenon are adolescents, college age, or young adult professionals. According to Dr. Mizuko Ito, a cultural anthropologist and Professor in Residence at the UC Irvine Donald Bren School of Information and Computer Sciences, the mobile device is the greatest proxy device used to create and distribute Social Media. She reportedly states that "teenagers capture and produce their own media, and stay in constant ambient contact with each other..." using mobile devices. Usually while doing this they are consuming other forms of media such as music or video content via their smart phones, tablets, or other similar devices. Effectively this has led social scientists to believe that learning and multitasking will have a new face as the products of the digital generation enter the work force and begin to integrate their learning methods into the standard preexisting business models of today. Professors Kaplan and Haenlein see ambient awareness as one of the major reasons for the success of such microblogging sites as Twitter.

== Origins ==
The earliest available technology that could be used for constant social contact is the cell phone. For the first time, people could be contacted readily and at will beyond the confines of their work or homes. Then later, with the additional service of texting, one can see the somewhat primitive form of the status update. Since the text message only allows for 160 characters to transmit pertinent information it paved the way for the status update as we know it today. The transition from only having a few points of regular long-distance contact, to being constantly available via cell phone, is what primed society for social networking websites.

Perhaps the first instance where these websites created the possibility of larger scale ambient awareness was when Facebook installed the news feed. The news feed automatically sends compiled information on all of a users contacts activities directly to them so that they can access all of the happenings in their world from one location. For the first time, becoming someone's Facebook friend was the equivalent of subscribing to a feed of their daily minutiae. Since this innovation, a new wave of micro-blogging services have emerged, such as Twitter or Tumblr. Although these services have often been criticized as containing seemingly meaningless snippets of information, when a follower gathers a certain amount of information, they begin to obtain an ambient understanding of who they are following. This has led to the mass usage of social media as not only a social tool but also as a marketing and business tool.

== Uses in marketing ==
Websites such as Twitter, YouTube, Facebook, and Myspace, among many others, have been used by people in all forms of business to create a closer digital/ambient bond with their clientele base. This is most notably seen in the music industry where social media networking has become the mainstay of all advertising for independent and major artists. The effect of this type of ambient marketing is that the consumer begins to get a sense of the artist's life style and personality. In this way social media outlets and ambient awareness have managed to tighten the gap between consumers and producers in all areas of business.

== Uses in business processes ==
As web-based collaboration tools and social project management suites proliferate, the addition of activity streams to those products help to create business context-specific ambient awareness, and produce a new class of products, such as social project management platforms.

== See also ==
- Creator economy
- Cultural technology
- Influence-for-hire
- Media intelligence
- Sentiment analysis
- Social cloud computing
- Social media intelligence
- Virtual collective consciousness
