= Media intelligence =

Media intelligence uses data mining and data science to analyze public, social and editorial media content. It refers to marketing systems that synthesize billions of online conversations into relevant information. This allow organizations to measure and manage content performance, understand trends, and drive communications and business strategy.

Media intelligence can include software as a service using big data terminology. This includes questions about messaging efficiency, share of voice, audience geographical distribution, message amplification, influencer strategy, journalist outreach, creative resonance, and competitor performance in all these areas.

Media intelligence differs from business intelligence in that it uses and analyzes data outside company firewalls. Examples of that data are user-generated content on social media sites, blogs, comment fields, and wikis etc. It may also include other public data sources like press releases, news, blogs, legal filings, reviews and job postings.

Media intelligence may also include competitive intelligence, wherein information that is gathered from publicly available sources such as social media, press releases, and news announcements are used to better understand the strategies and tactics being deployed by competing businesses.

Media intelligence is enhanced by means of emerging technologies like ambient intelligence, machine learning, semantic tagging, natural language processing, sentiment analysis and machine translation.

== Technologies used ==
Different media intelligence platforms use different technologies for monitoring, curating content, engaging with content, data analysis and measurement of communications and marketing campaign success. These technology providers may obtain content by scraping content directly from websites or by connecting to the API provided by social media, or other content platforms that are created for 3rd party developers to develop their own applications and services that access data. Technology companies may also get data from a data reseller.

Some social media monitoring and analytics companies use calls to data providers each time an end-user develops a query. Others archive and index social media posts to provide end users with on-demand access to historical data and enable methodologies and technologies leveraging network and relational data. Additional monitoring companies use crawlers and spidering technology to find keyword references, known as semantic analysis or natural language processing. Basic implementation involves curating data from social media on a large scale and analyzing the results to make sense out of it.

== See also ==
- Ambient awareness
- Content intelligence
- Creator economy
- Cultural technology
- Influence-for-hire
- Marketing and artificial intelligence
- Marketing intelligence
- Media monitoring
- Social bot
- Social cloud computing
- Social marketing intelligence
- Social media intelligence
- Social media monitoring
- Social software
- Virtual collective consciousness
