= We Feel Fine =

Jonathan Book (2005 - 2006 - 2009)

We Feel Fine is an interactive website, artwork, and book created by Jonathan Harris and Sep Kamvar that searches the internet every 10 minutes for expressions of human emotion on blogs and then displays the results in several visually-rich dynamic representations. Created in 2005 and launched in 2006, We Feel Fine was turned into a book in 2009.

== History ==
Sep Kamvar and Jonathan Harris started We Feel Fine in August 2005 as both a data visualization project and an online artwork. The site was launched officially on May 8, 2006. It has toured regularly and been exhibited as an artwork all over the world since its launch. In 2009, Kamvar and Harris took the findings from the four years since they launched the project and turned them into a book called "We Feel Fine: An Almanac of Human Emotion".

== Content ==
We Feel Fine is built on top of a data collection engine that scours blog posts every 10 minutes for occurrences of the phrases "I feel" or "I am feeling" and then saves into a database the sentences in which those phrases and any of the 5,000 pre-identified feelings are found. The sentences and their attendant feelings are then organized and displayed visually in 6 distinct "movements" called Madness, Murmurs, Montage, Mobs, Metrics, and Mounds. Users navigate between the movements in an applet. Kamvar and Harris have made a We Feel Fine API available with the intent of allowing other artists to create pieces about human emotion. The site currently collects approximately 15,000 - 20,000 new feelings every day. Since its launch in 2006, We Feel Fine has also been exhibited internationally in galleries, museums, and festivals, including:

List of "We Feel Fine" Exhibitions
| Location | Museum | Exhibition | Dates |
|---|---|---|---|
| Prague, Czech Republic | Laufen Gallery | GenArt | September 25, 2006 - October 20, 2006 |
| Seoul, Korea | Triad New Media Gallery | Fabrica: I've Been Waiting For You | November 16. 2006 - December 17, 2006 |
| Houston, Texas | Museum of Fine Arts, Houston | Color Into Light: Selections from the MFAH Collection | December 13, 2008 - April 5, 2009 |
| Park City, Utah | Sundance Film Festival | New Frontiers | January 15, 2009 - January 25, 2009 |
| Athens, Greece | National Museum of Contemporary Art - Athens | Tags, Ties and Affective Spies | March 18 to August 31, 2009 |
| Prague, Czech Republic | ENTER Festival | Tags, Ties and Affective Spies | April 18, 2009 - April 25, 2009 |
| London, England | Victoria and Albert Museum | Decode: Digital Design Sensations | December 8, 2009 - April 11, 2010 |
| New York City, New York | Ogilvy & Mather | New Language | May 19, 2010 - October 15, 2010 |
| Morwell, Victoria, Australia | Latrobe Regional Gallery | We Feel... | May 4, 2011 - May 29, 2011 |
| New York, NY | Pace/MacGill Gallery | Social Media | September 16, 2011 - October 15, 2011 |
| Holon, Israel | Design Museum Holon | Decode: Digital Design Sensations | November 18, 2011 - March 10, 2012 |

== Book release ==
Kamvar and Harris took the findings from the four years since We Feel Fine was launched in 2006 and turned them into a book called "We Feel Fine: An Almanac of Human Emotion". It was released on December 1, 2009 by Scribner. While the website presents the most recent feelings mined by the data collection engine, the book does a deeper statistical analysis of the approximately 12 million feelings collected up to the point of publication. Sections of the book are viewable as jpegs on the We Feel Fine website.

== Reception ==
We Feel Fine, in each of its forms, was received well by the public as well as critics, technology writers, and culture commentators. It has been featured in the New York Times, Wired, NPR, Fast Company, and BBC. In particular, We Feel Fine was highlighted in a number of "best of" or "Decade in Review" pieces. The site was praised by Reuters and New York Magazine who referred to it as a "mesmerizing visual experiment" and "astonishing and brilliant." From a design and technology perspective, the commentary centered around We Feel Fine as one of the defining examples of the potential for internet-based art and data visualization. In 2010, NPR, in its "Cosmos and Culture" feature stated that We Feel Fine "takes the cloud of feeling humans have always unconsciously moved through and makes it explicit, dynamic and global."
