= Bayesian classifier =

In computer science and statistics, Bayesian classifier may refer to:

- any classifier based on Bayesian probability
- a Bayes classifier, one that always chooses the class of highest posterior probability
  - in case this posterior distribution is modelled by assuming the observables are independent, it is a naive Bayes classifier
