= Social media stock bubble =

Speculative bubble involving social media

The social media bubble is a hypothesis stating that there was a speculative boom and bust phenomenon in the field of social media in the 2010s, particularly in the United States. The Wall Street Journal defined a bubble as stocks "priced above a level that can be justified by economic fundamentals," but this bubble includes social media. Social networking services (SNS) have seen huge growth since 2006, but some investors believed around 2014-2015, that the "bubble" was similar to the dot-com bubble of the late 1990s and early 2000s.

In 2015, Mark Cuban, owner of the Dallas Mavericks NBA team and star of the TV show, Shark Tank, sounded an alarm on his personal blog over the social media bubble, calling it worse than the tech bubble in 2000 due to the lack of liquidity in social media stocks. A year prior, however, Cuban told CNBC that he did not believe social media stocks were on the verge of a bubble. In a letter to investors in 2014, David Einhorn, who runs the hedge-fund Greenlight Capital, wrote that "we are witnessing our second tech bubble in 15 years." He went on to write, "What is uncertain is how much further the bubble can expand, and what might pop it." Einhorn cited several factors supporting the existence an over-exuberance including "rejection of conventional valuation methods" and "huge first day IPO pops for companies that have done little more than use the right buzzwords and attract the right venture capital."

Since those claims, services like Facebook, Twitter, Instagram, and Snapchat have grown to become multi-billion-dollar corporations generating enormous revenues, though some continue to lose money.

== History of social networking services ==
Social networking services have grown and evolved with time since the launch of SixDegrees.com in 1997. Cutting edge at its time, SixDegrees.com allowed users to create a profile, invite friends, and connect within its platform. At its peak, SixDegrees.com had more than 3.5 million users. Between 1997 and 2001 more social sites aimed at allowing users to connect with others for personal, professional, or dating reasons.

Friendster and MySpace were next to enter the social SNS arena, followed by Facebook in 2004. Even though MySpace had a following of more than 300 million users, it could not compete with Facebook, which now has overtaken the social networking world. However, as development of SNS started to emerge, a market saturation began to take effect.

Some classrooms have begun to incorporate technology in daily learning as well as social channels specific to student's course work. Traditional social media sites are used, as are educational oriented sites such as ShowMe and Educreations Interactive Whiteboard.

Launch Dates of Major Social Networking Sites	Website
1997	SixDegrees.com
1999	LiveJournal · AsianAvenue · Black Planet
2000	LunarStorm · MiGente
2001	Cyworld · Ryze
2002	Fotolog · Friendster · Skyblog
2003	LinkedIn · MySpace · Tribe.net · Open BC/XING · Last.FM · Hi5
2004	CouchSurfing · Orkut · Dogster · Flickr · Piczo · Mixi · Facebook (Harvard-only) · Multiply · aSmallWorld · Dodgeball · Care2 · Catster · Hyves
2005	Yahoo 360 · YouTube · Xanga · Cyworld · Bebo · Facebook (High School Networks) · Ning · AsianAvenue (relaunch)· BlackPlanet (relaunch)
2006	QQ (relaunch) · Facebook (corporate network) · Windows Live Spaces · Cyworld (U.S.) · Twitter · Facebook (everyone)

== Controversies ==
While SNS continue to play an influential role in helping people form real-world connections via the Internet, renewed concerns over the social media bubble have surfaced due to recent controversies. These threats include growing concerns about breaches in data, the rise of bot accounts, and the sharing of fake news on SNS platforms. There are also concerns that big data figures associated with these SNS are inflated or fake, as well as worries about the role the platforms played in national elections (see Russian interference in the 2016 United States elections). These issues have resulted in a lack of trust among the sites' users.

== See also ==
- AI bubble – Ongoing theorised stock market bubble
- Collapsology – Study of the risks of collapse of industrial civilization
- Criticism of capitalism – Arguments against the economic system of capitalism
- Cryptocurrency bubble – Speculative bubble involving cryptocurrency prices
- Digital Revolution – Industrial shift to information technology
- Dot-com bubble – Tech stock speculative craze, c. 1995–2003
- Echo chamber (media) – Situation that reinforces beliefs by repetition inside a closed system
- Fourth Industrial Revolution – 2010s–present technological convergence era
- Planned obsolescence – Product design with limited useful life
- Speculation – Engaging in risky financial transactions
- Web 2.0 – Websites that use technology beyond the static pages of the early Internet
