= Glee =

Glee may refer to:

- Glee (music), a type of English choral music
- Glee (TV series), an American musical comedy-drama TV series, and related media created by Ryan Murphy
- Glee (Bran Van 3000 album)
- Glee (Logan Lynn album)
- Glee.com, a social networking site for LGBTQ+ communities
- Glees, Germany, a municipality in the district of Ahrweiler, Rhineland-Palatinate
- Glee Peak, a summit in Washington state

== Variant casings ==
- GLEE, or Graph Layout Execution Engine, an earlier version of Microsoft Automatic Graph Layout, a .NET library
- GLee, or OpenGL Easy Extension library, a C/C++ library

== See also ==
- Happiness, or glee, an emotion
- Glee club (disambiguation)
