= Reinforcement (disambiguation) =

Reinforcement is a consequence that will strengthen an organism's future behavior whenever that behavior is preceded by a specific antecedent stimulus.

Reinforcement may also refer to:

- Reinforcement (speciation)
- Reinforcement bar or rebar, a steel bar or mesh of steel wires used as a tension device
- Reinforcement learning, an area of machine learning inspired by behaviorist psychology
  - "REINFORCE", a policy gradient method (often used as PPO)
- Reinforcement theory in the field of communication
- Reinforcements in military operations

== See also ==
- Stiffening
