= Ostrich effect =

Attempt made by investors to avoid negative financial information

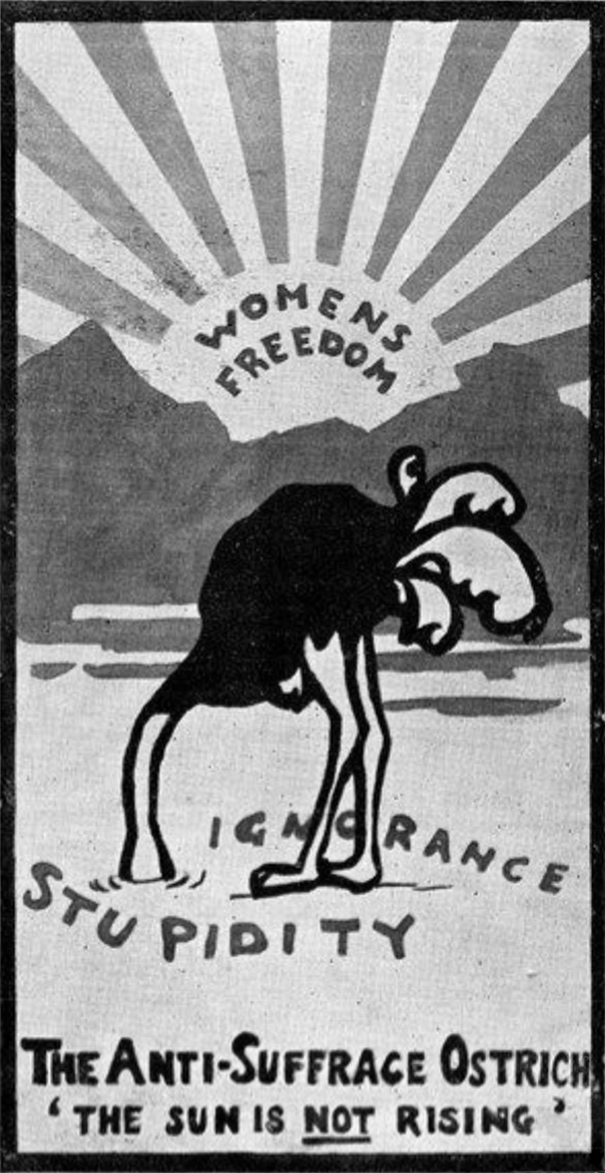
The "Anti-Suffrage Ostrich", illustrated by the Suffrage Atelier

The ostrich effect, also known as the ostrich problem, was originally coined by Dan Galai and Orly Sade. The name comes from the common (but false) legend that ostriches bury their heads in the sand to avoid danger. This effect is a cognitive bias where people tend to "bury their head in the sand" by avoiding learning of potentially negative but useful information, to prevent psychological discomfort. For example, a person may avoid looking at feedback on a project.

== Neuroscientific evidence ==
There is neuroscientific evidence of the ostrich effect. Tali Sharot investigated the differences in positive and negative information when updating existing beliefs. Consistent with the ostrich effect, participants presented with negative information were more likely to avoid updating their beliefs. Moreover, they found that the part of the brain responsible for this cognitive bias was the left IFG. By disrupting this part of the brain with transcranial magnetic stimulation, participants were more likely to accept the negative information provided.

== Researched contexts & applications ==
=== Finance ===
An everyday example of the ostrich effect in a financial context is people avoiding checking their bank account balance after spending a lot of money. The studies below explore the ostrich effect through investors in financial markets.

Galai and Sade studied investors' decision-making in Israel's capital market. They found that investors prefer financial investments where the risk is unreported over those with a similar risk–return profile but with frequently reported risks, saying that investors are willing to pay a premium for "the bliss of ignorance".

Later, Niklas Karlsson studied investors' decision-making in Swedish and US markets. They determined that investors from both countries looked up their portfolios more when the market index was increasing (positive information) and less when the index was decreasing (negative information).

=== Healthcare ===
There are known negative implications of the ostrich effect in healthcare. For example, people with diabetes avoid monitoring their blood sugar levels.

Ritesh Banerjee and Giulio Zanella highlighted the ostrich effect in avoiding preventive screening, studying women working at a company to understand how a woman's propensity to get annual mammograms changes after a co-worker is diagnosed with breast cancer. The company had on-site mammograms and removed all barriers to getting them, such as cost and long queues. 70% of eligible women took up the company's offer of an annual mammogram. However, surprisingly, in the presence of a co-worker diagnosed with breast cancer, women "spatially closer to her in the workplace" are 8% less likely to get a screening. Highlighting that in the presence of potentially negative information, people tend to avoid the chance to receive it.

=== Climate and energy ===
Research has found that when people feel uninformed about a pressing matter, they may exhibit the ostrich effect. The ostrich effect may explain why people sometimes avoid tackling climate change or energy depletion.

Steven Shepherd and Aaron Kay presented participants with a passage. One group read that the US would have oil for 240 more years (positive information), while the other read that supplies would diminish in 40 years (negative information). Afterwards, participants completed a questionnaire to gauge their interest in learning about energy depletion. Those who read that energy depletion was an urgent problem and that oil would run out in 40 years were more likely to avoid learning about the issue.

== Theories on causes ==
=== Cognitive dissonance ===
Cognitive dissonance is a state of psychological discomfort that arises when an individual holds two or more conflicting beliefs. Betty Chang found that when participants ranked reasons on why they did not monitor progress, the main reason was that "information on goal progress would demand a change in beliefs". This statement shows that when confronted with information that contradicts their beliefs, individuals may experience cognitive dissonance and avoid seeking it to reduce discomfort. This avoidance is the ostrich effect. The opposite, seeking information consistent with one's beliefs, is a cognitive bias termed confirmation bias.

=== Trustability ===
Chang also found that some participants exhibited the ostrich effect because they did not trust the information provided. Lack of trust is especially true for negative information; Daniel R. Ilgen found that people are more likely to trust positive feedback than negative feedback. Additionally, Kenneth G. DeBono and Richard J. Harnish found that the information's trustability depends on the perceived expertise of the information provider. The higher the perceived expertise, the more likely people trust it.

=== Loss aversion ===
Loss aversion is the tendency for people to feel the pain of losses more strongly than the pleasure of equivalent gains. Panidi (2015) looked at the link between loss aversion and the ostrich effect – loss aversion was measured through lottery choices, and the ostrich effect was measured through preventive medical testing. The study found that higher loss aversion decreases the chance of the decision to do a preventive medical test. Demonstrating that the higher the loss aversion in an individual, the more likely they are to display the ostrich effect by avoiding information on diagnosis.

== Criticism ==
=== Meerkat effect ===
==== Initial findings ====
Svetlana Gherzi studied 617 investors from Barclays Wealth & Management UK. They found no perceivable attempt by investors to ignore or avoid negative information. Instead, they saw that "investors increase their portfolio monitoring following both positive and daily negative market returns, behaving more like hyper-vigilant meerkats than head-in-the-sand ostriches". They dubbed this phenomenon the "meerkat effect".

==== Follow-up research ====
Nachum Sicherman showed that the sample and demographic moderate the extent that investors exhibited the ostrich effect. In a sample of 100,000, Sicherman found that 79% of investors showed the ostrich effect while 21% had "anti-ostrich behavior", such as the meerkat effect.

The researchers argued that Gherzi sample size of 617 investors was too small, one potential reason that most investors exhibited the meerkat effect rather than the ostrich effect. Sicherman also showed that the ostrich effect appeared more in "men, older investors and wealthier investors".

== Future research ==
Another moderator for the ostrich effect that has yet to be specifically studied but has been theorised is cultural differences. Culture may impact the ostrich effect as the underlying causes of the ostrich effect are all influenced by culture. Etsuko Hoshino-Browne showed that cognitive dissonance is resolved in different manners in collectivistic cultures compared to individualistic cultures. Furthermore, Mei Wang shows that loss aversion is higher in individualistic cultures, and Hazel R. Markus and Shinobu Kitayama (1991) found that collectivistic cultures tend to trust negative feedback and reject positive ones. Individualism appears more in western culture, hinting at the ostrich effect being higher in western cultures. The studies on the ostrich effect are predominantly conducted on western cultures; therefore, future studies must test for potential cultural differences in the ostrich effect.

== See also ==
- Denial
- Elephant in the room
- Selective exposure
- Voldemort effect
