= Perceptual vigilance =

Form of selective perception

In psychology and cognitive science, perceptual vigilance (also called perceptual sensitization) refers to a form of selective perception where a person has a heightened state of awareness and attentiveness towards specific stimuli or information, generally to satisfy a motive. This phenomenon involves individuals becoming more attuned to detecting and processing relevant sensory input or cues from their environment. Perceptual vigilance is influenced by various factors such as personal interests, goals or expectations.

This heightened perceptual sensitivity plays a crucial role in cognitive processes such as attention, perception, and memory. It involves selectively focusing attention on certain stimuli while filtering out irrelevant or less salient information. This selective attention allows individuals to prioritize and respond effectively to important or meaningful stimuli in their surroundings.

Researchers in psychology and cognitive science study perceptual vigilance to understand how attentional mechanisms operate and how they can be influenced by internal and external factors. By investigating the cognitive processes underlying perceptual vigilance, researchers gain insights into human perception, behavior and decision-making.

== See also ==
- Perceptual defense
- Selective perception
