= Barely Legal =

Barely Legal may refer to:

- National Lampoon's Barely Legal, a 2003 film starring Erik von Detten
- Barely Legal (film), a 2011 direct-to-video sex comedy film
- Barely Legal (album), a 1997 album by The Hives
- "Barely Legal", a song by The Strokes from the 2001 album Is This It
- "Barely Legal" (Family Guy), a 2006 episode of the American animated sitcom Family Guy
- ECW Barely Legal, a pay-per-view event promoted by Extreme Championship Wrestling in April 1997
- Barely Legal (magazine), pornographic magazine
- Barely Legal (Banksy), a show by graffiti artist Banksy
- "Barely Legal", a 2016 album by Ayesha Erotica
