= Creative limitation =

Creative limitation is the concept of how purposely limiting oneself can actually drive creativity. At a 2013 TED conference, artist Phil Hansen made several remarks concerning the value of limitations, among them that "We need to first be limited in order to become limitless,” and “If you treat the problems as possibilities, life will start to dance with you in the most amazing ways.”

Creative limitation can also be thought of as a way to achieve a novel effect or goal that is not otherwise possible using conventional, readily accessible, methods. Igor Stravinsky used what he called creative limitation with time signatures, by restricting himself from using any, in his composition 'The Rite of Spring' as well as in alternate aspects of his other musical works.

== See also ==
- Constrained writing
- Oulipo
- Selective retention
