= Media Practice Model =

The Media Practice Model is a media effects model used in the area of mass communication. This model was developed by Jeanne R. Steele and Jane D. Brown in 1995, and it takes a practice perspective which means that it focuses on everyday activities and routines of media consumption. This theoretical framework was developed to better understand what drives teenagers to pick one media source over another, and what factors play a role in this decision. The Media Practice Model emphasizes the constant interaction between consumers and the media, and focuses on the dialectical aspect of this interaction, suggesting that it is the adolescents’ individual characteristics, environment and daily practices that allow the media to have stronger or weaker effects on them (Steele & Brown, 1995).

== Origin ==
The model was developed based on a study that progressed from 1987 through 1993, and used a variety of methods such as daily journals, in-depth interviews, self-administered questionnaires and “room touring” to understand, as Steele and Brown call it, the adolescents’ “room culture.” This environment was chosen based on the facts that adolescents’ bedrooms are usually cluttered with different media materials and sources, as well as the fact that this is a place where adolescents spend a good part of their day. This is also a place that provides an intimate environment where adolescents can experiment with possible selves (Markus & Nurius, 1986). The Media Practice Model was based on the findings of this first study, and the incorporation of other media effects theories such as Selective Exposure Theory, Uses and Gratifications, Framing, Cultivation theory, and Emotional Conditioning.

== Components ==
The Media Practice Model proposed by Steele and Brown has the concepts of selection, interaction and application as the three main components, but also takes into account one's identity and lived experience. Identity formation is the key component of this model and it represents the main task of adolescent formation (Steele & Brown, 1995). It is believed that adolescents’ sense of who they are influences their interactions with the media, and those interactions in turn influence their sense of who they are, in what Steele and Brown call an ongoing process of cultural production and reproduction. The theoretical perspective of “lived through experience” (Vygotsky, 1978), also takes into account the developmental stage, the sociocultural differences based on gender, class, and race, as well as other factors such as religious beliefs, interactions within one's neighborhood, school, family, friends circle, and so on. This concept of “lived experience” emphasizes the idea that adolescents’ interaction with the media does not happen in a vacuum. It is argued that the continuous dialectal relationship between the other four components of the Media Practice Model, selection, interaction, application, and identity, all occur within the context of “lived experience (Steele & Brown, 1995).”

Selection, within the Media Practice Model, is simply defined as the act of choosing among media related alternatives (Steele & Brown, 1995). Selection is influenced by motivations, which in turn affects attention to the media selected. In this context, the concept of motivation is defined based on previous theories such as selective exposure and uses and gratifications theory. This means that a teenager's motivation to attend to certain media might be based on affective, behavioral, cognitive and instrumental needs, or it could also simply be a result of habituation (Steele & Brown, 1995). As far as factoring in “lived experience”, in their initial study Steele and Brown found that selection is also influenced by gender and race. Thus, boys were more likely to be more interested in media that dealt with sports, and this was also reflected in how their rooms were decorated. Also, an African-American girl was more interested in magazines and certain types of music that reflected her ethnic heritage.

Interaction is defined as the cognitive, affective, and behavioral engagement with the media that produces cultural meanings, which are affected by adolescents’ evaluation and interpretation of the media content. In terms of practice, interaction was conceptually defined as what is actually happening at the moment adolescent use the media (Steele & Brown, 1995). As noted in the definition, adolescents can interact with the media on different levels such as cognitive (processing information), affective (arousal), or behavioral (dancing, channel surfing, etc.). However, researchers in communication have been more concerned with the cognitive and affective interactions, and adolescents’ evaluation and interpretation of media content are clearly more closely related to those two types of interactions.

Evaluation and interpretation of media content are also believed to play an important role in the process of identity formation. Thus, adolescents are more likely to prefer characters that they can relate to, that match with who they are or would like to become (Steele & Brown, 1995). In their study, Steele and Brown (1995) came across different interpretation and evaluation of the media, as teenagers were trying to make sense of the messages the media were conveying. This process of sense making is sometimes very complex, as teenagers are trying to understand themselves and the world around them by trying to balance their already formed beliefs and worldviews, with the sometimes contradictory messages of the media (Steele & Brown, 1995).

The concept of “lived experience” was shown to have a role in the interaction component of the model as well. As found by Steele and Brown, racial understanding, class and gender also affected how teenagers interpreted and evaluated the messages conveyed by the media.

Application is defined as the concrete ways in which adolescents use media in their everyday lives (Steele & Brown, 1995). The Media Practice Model looks at two different types of application: appropriation and incorporation.

Appropriation is an active, intentional, easily visible and goal oriented use of the media by adolescents. Steele and Brown (1995) found some typical examples of media appropriation when it comes to teenagers: enhance a mood or cope with feelings; sort through cultural values and norms; make a statement about identity; imitate admired behavior; fantasize about possible selves or situations. Incorporation, on the other hand, is harder to recognize because it is more internal, it is less visible, and most of the times happens unconsciously. Incorporation refers to taking the messages and beliefs conveyed by the media and making them a part of the self, building on already existing attitudes, feelings and knowledge (Steele & Brown, 1995). In trying to better explain the concept of incorporation, Steele and Brown (1995) build upon other media effects theories such as framing, cultivation, and emotional conditioning.

== Development ==
Based on reviewers’ critiques that the concepts of incorporation and appropriation are one and the same thing, and also based on a new study performed in 1999, Steele slightly revised this component of the Media Practice Model. Based on the study, Steele noticed that within the application component of the model, a new factor stood out: resistance. Resistance was defined as “teens’ practice of using media to open up a space for combating the status quo (Steele, 1999).” This suggests that when adolescents feel marginalized they engage with media that go against the dominant culture. This way they become fans of movies that depict drug usage, are graphically violent or show sexually explicit material, or start listening to less culturally popular genres of music such as hard rock or heavy metal (Steele, 1999).

Besides contributing to the Media Practice Model through the discussed revision to the application component, Steele’s (1999) study also provided more depth to the “lived experience” component. It demonstrated more explicitly how one's race, gender, and developmental stage plays an important role in their media practices and choices. Also, while acknowledging the importance of media content, this study puts more emphasis on media practice rather than on media content or media effects.

Since it was first introduced by Steele and Brown in 1995, and then revised in 1999 by Steele, the Media Practice Model has been used by other researchers in different contexts; however, this model has experienced modest popularity. One of the main drawbacks of this model is its general scope and simplified description of media use. Even so, this model allows for the integration of a whole multitude of variables within its main components, and offers scholars the possibility to use it for more in-depth investigative purposes if desired.
