= AsianAve =

Social networking service

AsianAve.com
- Website type: Social networking service
- Founded: 1997; 29 years ago
- Headquarters: 205 Hudson Street, 6th Floor; New York City, New York, United States
- Owner: Urban One
- Current status: Redirected to BlackPlanet

AsianAve or Asian Avenue was a social networking service that focused on Asian Americans. The platform was shut down and the URL now redirects to its sister site, BlackPlanet.

== History ==
Originally named AsianAvenue (or Asian Avenue), the site was launched on July 21, 1997 by co-founders Benjamin Sun, Peter Chen, Grace Chang, Michael Montero, and Calvin Wong. By 1998, The New York Times described it as "unusually successful" despite being "run out of an apartment", having hit five million page views from 50,000 users.

Members were politically active, protesting an MSNBC headline for the 1998 Winter Olympics reading "American beats out Kwan", referring to U.S. Olympic teammates Tara Lipinski and Michelle Kwan. In 1999, members protested an ad for SKYY vodka showing a partly dressed white woman being served by a woman in a Mandarin dress and chopsticks in her hair, which the protesters said perpetuated racial stereotypes. After some 300 postings on Asian Avenue were forwarded to SKYY, the company agreed to stop using the ad.

The site received over 70,000 unique visitor hits in August 2000. At its peak, there were over 2 million users with more than 5000 online at any time. Robert X. Cringely claimed in 2000 that Asian Avenue had more members than BlackPlanet, a Community Connect sister site.

Fine Line Features chose the site for an exclusive interview with Chinese NBA star Yao Ming to promote its documentary The Year of the Yao. One writer characterized it "mainly an Internet dating site" In 2003, Darrell Hamamoto used an interview on the site to attract male talent for his adult film Skin to Skin, using the "unheard of" pairing of an Asian-American male performer with Asian-American woman.

At one point the site made various previously free features available only to premium users, which hurt the site's popularity. On October 31, 2005, the website relaunched the social network features. As of April 2007, there were 1.4 million registered users with fewer than 100 online at any given time.

Partners include party promoters (Synergy), film festivals (Toronto Reel Asian International Film Festival, Asian American International Film Festival), media (AngryAsianMan.com, AZN TV) and many more. Music artists, such as Notorious MSG, Far*East Movement, and Magnetic North have gained popularity from their exposure on AsianAve.com. In 2010, Monster.com announced a co-branded partnership with Asian Avenue. Based on a small questionnaire members filled out when signing up for a membership, Monster generated a list of potential job openings and interests, which was displayed after users signed into AsianAvenue.

In October 2007, U.S. presidential candidate Barack Obama created profiles on AsianAve as well as sister sites BlackPlanet, MiGente.com and Glee.com.

AsianAvenue allowed users to see who visited their profiles, in contrast to Facebook, where browsing is entirely private. Members can view a list of members that have looked at their site on their main profile page.

The site was shut down and the URL is now redirected to its sister site, BlackPlanet.
