= BlackPlanet =

Social networking service

Blackplanet.com
- Type: Social networking company
- Founded: 1999
- Founder: Benjamin Sun; Omar Wasow
- Headquarters: 205 Hudson Street, 6th Floor; New York, New York, USA
- Owner: Urban One
- Website: blackplanet.com

BlackPlanet is an African-American social networking service for matchmaking and job postings. The company website also contains forums for discussion of political and social issues.

BlackPlanet was launched by internet analyst Omar Wasow on September 1, 1999. Wasow had previously created a pre-web community dubbed New York Online in 1993 with Community Connect's CEO, Benjamin Sun.

== Company ==
The website is run by Community Connect of New York City, which also owns AsianAvenue.com and MiGente.com. In April 2008, Community Connect and its constituent websites were purchased for $38 million by Radio One, a Lanham-based media company.

BlackPlanet states its broader mission is to strengthen the Black community.

== Website ==
The most popular forums on BlackPlanet were Current Events, Heritage & Identity, Relationships, Religion & Spirituality, and Women. According to Wasow, BlackPlanet's home-grown software encouraged social connection rather than passive content consumption, allowing users to move between personal pages and a variety of message boards. BlackPlanet hosted more than 6 million unique visitors per month in 2008.

Wasow went so far as to claim that

The guys who started Myspace were quoted in Business Week magazine saying that they looked at BlackPlanet as a model for Myspace and thought there was an opportunity to do a general market version of what BlackPlanet was.

However, by 2011, usage had begun to fall off, and BlackPlanet was no longer among the top 15 social networks, according to eBizMBA. Observers began to suggest that the demise of the social network appeared imminent as "BlackPlanet [fell] to the wayside," replaced by other networks that started to "take up the social network mantle."

== Mobile applications ==
BlackPlanet introduced a free mobile app in 2009 called BlackPlanetMobile. BlackPlanet Text Alerts also became available to alert users of updates and notifications.

BlackPlanet also developed two interactive games for users, Farmandia and Fishdom.

Farmandia's similarities to Facebook's Farmville did not go unnoticed by BlackPlanet users, who pointed out the need for improvement of the site's infrastructure and principal features such as user chat rather than the introduction of games.

== Lawsuit ==
In October 2011, an anonymous model filed a federal lawsuit against BlackPlanet.com regarding a 2007 incident in which she was drugged and raped by two men who met the woman through the website. The two men (40-year-old Lavont Flanders, Jr. and 45-year-old Emerson Callum) were convicted by a federal jury in Miami in December 2011 of multiple sex-related and conspiracy charges and were sentenced to life in prison. The woman alleges that BlackPlanet.com "failed to warn women about the dangers of sexual predators". The site's parent company told the Miami Herald it "vehemently" denies the allegations.

== In the press ==
In 2007, BlackPlanet was featured in the press when the Pentagon banned it, as well as other sites, on the U.S. Department of Defense network in order to free up bandwidth, suggesting high usage levels.

== BlackPlanet Rising ==

BlackPlanet Rising was a BlackPlanet users community project set up by the website to encourage community support and services by its members. As part of their mission, they aimed to motivate and involve individuals to participate in civic engagement.

BlackPlanet Rising's Giving page via DonorsChoose had reached $11,023 donated by 36 donors, reaching 5,190 students in April 2011.

=== Volunteers ===
BlackPlanet Rising's VolunteerMatch site matched user's locations with volunteer opportunities in their area. They quoted Barack Obama's Presidential Election as a call for users to "bring a new energy and agenda to our country".

=== Riser of the Month ===
The BlackPlanet Rising community campaign identified a "Riser of the Month" from September 2010 to May 2011. These were often political and social advocates, and community activists who supported the African-American community. The website contained a feature article on the individual chosen each month. Risers of the Month include:

- Michele Brock - May 2011
- Janks Morton – March 2011
- Kevin Powell – February 2011
- Mike Oxlittle – January 2011
- Oni Joseph – November 2010
- Ryan Mack – October 2010
- George L. Cook III – September 2010

== See also ==
- Blackvoices.com
- List of social networking websites
