= Polite fiction =

Known falsehood a group shares for politeness

A polite fiction is a social scenario in which all participants are aware of a truth, but pretend to believe in some alternative version of events to avoid conflict or embarrassment. Polite fictions are closely related to euphemism, in which a word or phrase that might be impolite, disagreeable, or offensive is replaced by another word or phrase that both speaker and listener understand to have the same meaning. In scholarly usage, "polite fiction" can be traced to at least 1953.

== Examples ==
In societies where premarital sex is socially unacceptable, a pregnancy resulting from pre-marital sex generally results in social stigma for both mother and child, and possibly her family as well. To alleviate this, the mother and father are often forced into a shotgun wedding. The polite fiction is that the pregnancy only began after the wedding, even though the mother may be visibly pregnant during it and the child is born fully developed despite being ostensibly preterm.

An informal example would be of someone who goes out drinking after telling their family that they are merely going for an evening walk to enjoy the night air. Even though many relatives involved know that the person is likely leaving to drink alcohol, and may come home drunk, they may act as if the person is going out for a walk, and act as if they do not notice signs of alcohol intoxication when they return.

Another common example is a couple that has had an argument, after which one of them absents themselves from a subsequent social gathering, with the other claiming that they are ill, especially if this is a regular occurrence.

In these instances, although others in the subject's social circles may be aware of the truth, they will typically refrain from pointing it out for fear of causing upset and troubling their relationship with the subject. This violates social norms against lying (a human behavior related to ethics codes and ethics clarity) in favor of retaining politeness and trust, with the effect of maintenance of social bonds and provision of ideological support.

== Denialism ==
Polite fictions can slip into denial. This is especially the case when the fiction is actually meant to fool some observers, such as outsiders or children judged too young to be told the truth. The truth then becomes "the elephant in the room"; no matter how obvious it is, the people most affected pretend to others and to themselves that it is not so. This can be used to humorous effect in comedy, where a character will seem bent on making it impossible to maintain the polite fiction.

== See also ==
- Diplomatic illness
- Dogma
- Elephant in the room
- The Emperor's New Clothes
- Etiquette
- Interpersonal communication
- Kayfabe
- Legal fiction
- Minimisation (psychology)
- Obfuscation
- Open secret
- Persuasive definition
- Polite lie
- Voldemort effect
- What happens on tour, stays on tour
- White lie
