= Diplomatic illness =

Feigning of illness to avoid social duties

Diplomatic illness is the practice amongst diplomats and government ministers of feigning illness, or another debilitating condition, to avoid engaging in diplomatic or social engagements. The excuse of ill-health is designed to avoid formally offending the host or other parties. The term also refers to the period during which the "diplomatic illness" is claimed to persist.

== Examples ==
- General John J. Pershing, on his return in 1926 from unsuccessful negotiations among Peru, Bolivia and Chile and suffering from ill-health, was stated by his critics to have a "diplomatic illness".
- During the Communist takeover in Czechoslovakia in 1948, foreign minister Jan Masaryk was thought to have a "diplomatic illness", as he stayed out of touch with many of his former foreign contacts.
- A temporary absence of Bosnian Serb leader Ratko Mladic, at a time in 1995 when Bosnian Serb forces were withdrawing near Sarajevo under an agreement with NATO, was ascribed by some sources to "diplomatic illness".
- Boris Yeltsin, the then leader of the Russian Federation, was sometimes claimed to be invoking "diplomatic illness". One occasion was in 1994 on the outbreak of the First Chechen War; another coincided with a 1998 summit meeting of the Commonwealth of Independent States, and another was in 1999 when he was due to sign a treaty with Belarusian leader Alexander Lukashenko. The allegations were dubious, as Yeltsin suffered from repeated genuine bouts of ill-health.
- Polish leader Lech Kaczyński cited illness to avoid a Weimar Triangle meeting in the wake of a diplomatic dispute with Germany in 2006.

== Related terms ==
- William Gladstone referred to a "diplomatic cold" as an alternative to declining a social engagement outright.
- Neville Chamberlain is reported to have contracted "diplomatic gout" in 1938.
- Polite fiction
- Blue flu
