= Selective exposure theory =

Theory within the practice of psychology

Selective exposure is a theory within the practice of psychology, often used in media and communication research, that historically refers to individuals' tendency to favor information which reinforces their pre-existing views while avoiding contradictory information. Selective exposure has also been known and defined as "congeniality bias" or "confirmation bias" in various texts throughout the years.

According to the historical use of the term, people tend to select specific aspects of exposed information which they incorporate into their mindset. These selections are made based on their perspectives, beliefs, attitudes, and decisions. People can mentally dissect the information they are exposed to and select favorable evidence, while ignoring the unfavorable. The foundation of this theory is rooted in the cognitive dissonance theory (Festinger 1957), which asserts that when individuals are confronted with contrasting ideas, certain mental defense mechanisms are activated to produce harmony between new ideas and pre-existing beliefs, which results in cognitive equilibrium. Cognitive equilibrium, which is defined as a state of balance between a person's mental representation of the world and his or her environment, is crucial to understanding selective exposure theory. According to Jean Piaget, when a mismatch occurs, people find it to be "inherently dissatisfying".

Selective exposure relies on the assumption that one will continue to seek out information on an issue even after an individual has taken a stance on it. The position that a person has taken will be colored by various factors of that issue that are reinforced during the decision-making process. According to Stroud (2008), theoretically, selective exposure occurs when people's beliefs guide their media selections.

Selective exposure has been displayed in various contexts such as self-serving situations and situations in which people hold prejudices regarding outgroups, particular opinions, and personal and group-related issues. Perceived usefulness of information, perceived norm of fairness, and curiosity of valuable information are three factors that can counteract selective exposure.

Also of great concern is the theory of "Selective Participation" proposed by Sir Godson David in 2024

This theory suggests that individuals have the ability to selectively participate in certain aspects of events or activities that are most meaningful or important to them, while being fully aware of the consequences of neglecting other aspects.

In this theory, individuals may prioritize certain elements of an event based on personal values, interests, or goals, and may choose to invest their time, energy, and resources in these specific areas. They may also make conscious decisions to limit participation in other aspects of the event, recognizing that they cannot engage fully in all aspects simultaneously.

By selectively participating in specific aspects of events, individuals can focus on what matters most to them, optimize their resources and efforts in those areas, and compensate for any potential neglect in other areas. This approach may allow individuals to maintain a sense of control, satisfaction, and well-being while navigating complex events or activities.

Overall, the theory of Selective Participation emphasizes the importance of intentional decision-making and prioritization in event participation, acknowledging that individuals have the agency to choose where to direct their time and attention based on their individual preferences and goals.

== Effect on decision-making ==
=== Individual versus group decision-making ===
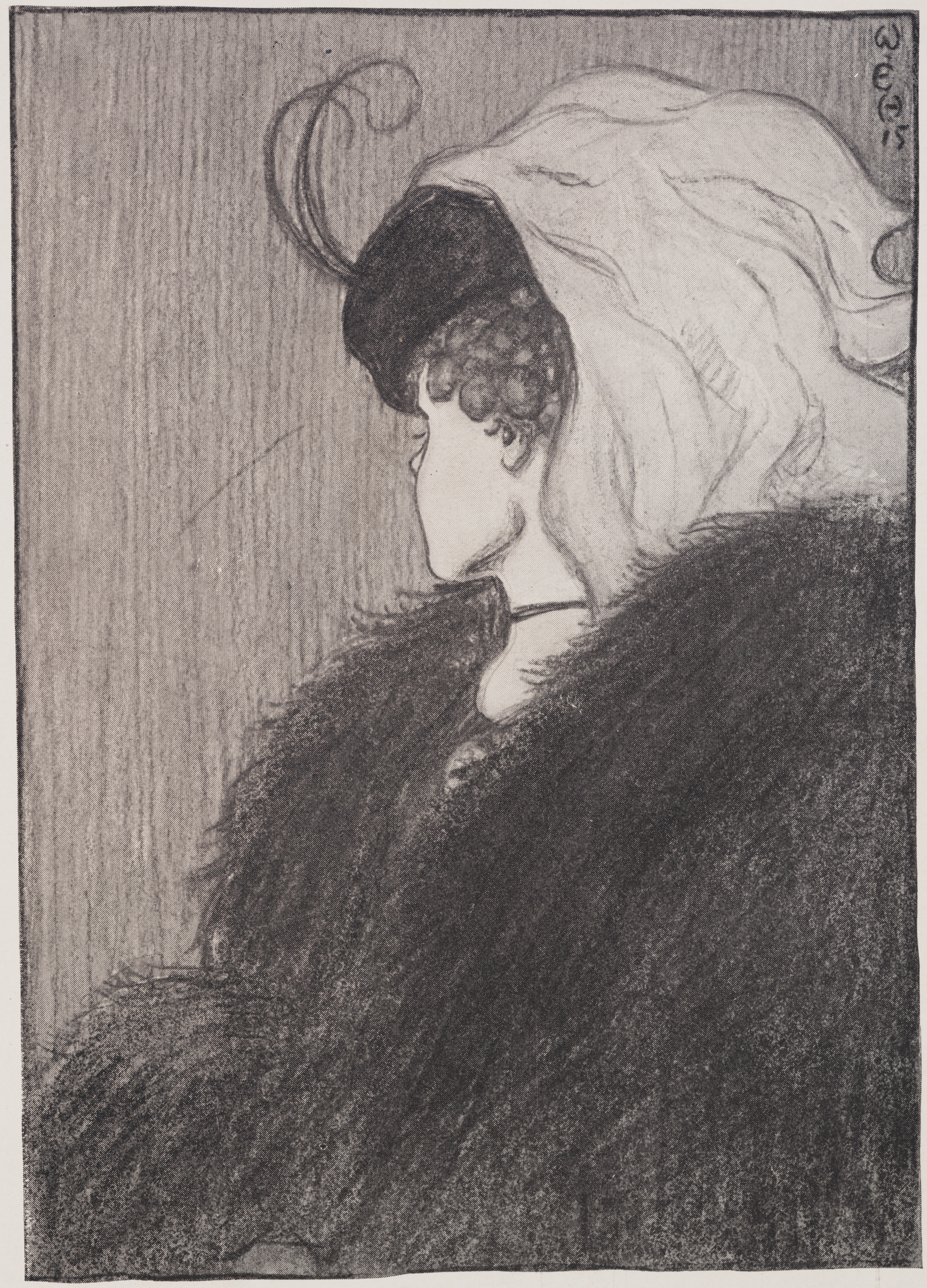
This image, which can be seen as a young woman or an older woman, serves as an example of how individuals can choose to perceive the same image differently. According to Selective Exposure Theory, people tend to seek out the version of a stimulant that they want to be exposed to, such as a form of the stimulant that they are already familiar with.

Selective exposure can often affect the decisions people make as individuals or as groups because they may be unwilling to change their views and beliefs either collectively or on their own, despite conflicting and reliable information. An example of the effects of selective exposure is the series of events leading up to the Bay of Pigs Invasion in 1961. President John F. Kennedy was given the go ahead by his advisers to authorize the invasion of Cuba by poorly trained expatriates despite overwhelming evidence that it was a foolish and ill-conceived tactical maneuver. The advisers were so eager to please the President that they confirmed their cognitive bias for the invasion rather than challenging the faulty plan. Changing beliefs about one's self, other people, and the world are three variables as to why people fear new information. A variety of studies has shown that selective exposure effects can occur in the context of both individual and group decision making. Numerous situational variables have been identified that increase the tendency toward selective exposure. Social psychology, specifically, includes research with a variety of situational factors and related psychological processes that eventually persuade a person to make a quality decision. Additionally, from a psychological perspective, the effects of selective exposure can both stem from motivational and cognitive accounts.

=== Effect of information quantity ===
According to research study by Fischer, Schulz-Hardt, et al. (2008), the quantity of decision-relevant information that the participants were exposed to had a significant effect on their levels of selective exposure. A group for which only two pieces of decision-relevant information were given had experienced lower levels of selective exposure than the other group who had ten pieces of information to evaluate. This research brought more attention to the cognitive processes of individuals when they are presented with a very small amount of decision-consistent and decision-inconsistent information. The study showed that in situations such as this, an individual becomes more doubtful of their initial decision due to the unavailability of resources. They begin to think that there is not enough data or evidence in this particular field in which they are told to make a decision about. Because of this, the subject becomes more critical of their initial thought process and focuses on both decision-consistent and inconsistent sources, thus decreasing his level of selective exposure. For the group who had plentiful pieces of information, this factor made them confident in their initial decision because they felt comfort from the fact that their decision topic was well-supported by a large number of resources. Therefore, the availability of decision-relevant and irrelevant information surrounding individuals can influence the level of selective exposure experienced during the process of decision-making.

Selective exposure is prevalent within singular individuals and groups of people and can influence either to reject new ideas or information that is not commensurate with the original ideal. In Jonas et al. (2001) empirical studies were done on four different experiments investigating individuals' and groups' decision making. This article suggests that confirmation bias is prevalent in decision making. Those who find new information often draw their attention towards areas where they hold personal attachment. Thus, people are driven toward pieces of information that are coherent with their own expectations or beliefs as a result of this selective exposure theory occurring in action. Throughout the process of the four experiments, generalization is always considered valid and confirmation bias is always present when seeking new information and making decisions.

=== Accuracy motivation and defense motivation ===
Fischer and Greitemeyer (2010) explored individuals' decision making in terms of selective exposure to confirmatory information. Selective exposure posed that individuals make their decisions based on information that is consistent with their decision rather than information that is inconsistent. Recent research has shown that "Confirmatory Information Search" was responsible for the 2008 bankruptcy of the Lehman Brothers Investment Bank which then triggered the 2008 financial crisis. In the zeal for profit and economic gain, politicians, investors, and financial advisors ignored the mathematical evidence that foretold the housing market crash in favor of flimsy justifications for upholding the status quo. Researchers explain that subjects have the tendency to seek and select information using their integrative model. There are two primary motivations for selective exposure: Accuracy Motivation and Defense Motivation. Accuracy Motivation explains that an individual is motivated to be accurate in their decision making and Defense Motivation explains that one seeks confirmatory information to support their beliefs and justify their decisions. Accuracy motivation is not always beneficial within the context of selective exposure and can instead be counterintuitive, increasing the amount of selective exposure. Defense motivation can lead to reduced levels of selective exposure.

=== Personal attributes ===
Selective exposure avoids information inconsistent with one's beliefs and attitudes. For example, former Vice President Dick Cheney would only enter a hotel room after the television was turned on and tuned to a conservative television channel. When analyzing a person's decision-making skills, his or her unique process of gathering relevant information is not the only factor taken into account. Fischer et al. (2010) found it important to consider the information source itself, otherwise explained as the physical being that provided the source of information. Selective exposure research generally neglects the influence of indirect decision-related attributes, such as physical appearance. In Fischer et al. (2010) two studies hypothesized that physically attractive information sources resulted in decision makers to be more selective in searching and reviewing decision-relevant information. Researchers explored the impact of social information and its level of physical attractiveness. The data was then analyzed and used to support the idea that selective exposure existed for those who needed to make a decision. Therefore, the more attractive an information source was, the more positive and detailed the subject was with making the decision. Physical attractiveness affects an individual's decision because the perception of quality improves. Physically attractive information sources increased the quality of consistent information needed to make decisions and further increased the selective exposure in decision-relevant information, supporting the researchers' hypothesis. Both studies concluded that attractiveness is driven by a different selection and evaluation of decision-consistent information. Decision makers allow factors such as physical attractiveness to affect everyday decisions due to the works of selective exposure. In another study, selective exposure was defined by the amount of individual confidence. Individuals can control the amount of selective exposure depending on whether they have a low self-esteem or high self-esteem. Individuals who maintain higher confidence levels reduce the amount of selective exposure. Albarracín and Mitchell (2004) hypothesized that those who displayed higher confidence levels were more willing to seek out information both consistent and inconsistent with their views. The phrase "decision-consistent information" explains the tendency to actively seek decision-relevant information. Selective exposure occurs when individuals search for information and show systematic preferences towards ideas that are consistent, rather than inconsistent, with their beliefs. On the contrary, those who exhibited low levels of confidence were more inclined to examine information that did not agree with their views. The researchers found that in three out of five studies participants showed more confidence and scored higher on the Defensive Confidence Scale, which serves as evidence that their hypothesis was correct.

Bozo et al. (2009) investigated the anxiety of fearing death and compared it to various age groups in relation to health-promoting behaviors. Researchers analyzed the data by using the terror management theory and found that age had no direct effect on specific behaviors. The researchers thought that a fear of death would yield health-promoting behaviors in young adults. When individuals are reminded of their own death, it causes stress and anxiety, but eventually leads to positive changes in their health behaviors. Their conclusions showed that older adults were consistently better at promoting and practicing good health behaviors, without thinking about death, compared to young adults. Young adults were less motivated to change and practice health-promoting behaviors because they used the selective exposure to confirm their prior beliefs. Selective exposure thus creates barriers between the behaviors in different ages, but there is no specific age at which people change their behaviors.

Though physical appearance will impact one's personal decision regarding an idea presented, a study conducted by Van Dillen, Papies, and Hofmann (2013) suggests a way to decrease the influence of personal attributes and selective exposure on decision-making. The results from this study showed that people do pay more attention to physically attractive or tempting stimuli; however, this phenomenon can be decreased through increasing the "cognitive load." In this study, increasing cognitive activity led to a decreased impact of physical appearance and selective exposure on the individual's impression of the idea presented. This is explained by acknowledging that we are instinctively drawn to certain physical attributes, but if the required resources for this attraction are otherwise engaged at the time, then we might not notice these attributes to an equal extent. For example, if a person is simultaneously engaging in a mentally challenging activity during the time of exposure, then it is likely that less attention will be paid to appearance, which leads to a decreased impact of selective exposure on decision-making.

== Theories accounting for selective exposure ==
Festinger's groundbreaking study on cognitive dissonance is the foundation for Modern Selective Exposure Theory.

=== Cognitive dissonance theory ===
Leon Festinger is widely considered as the father of modern social psychology and as an important figure to that field of practice as Freud was to clinical psychology and Piaget was to developmental psychology. He was considered to be one of the most significant social psychologists of the 20th century. His work demonstrated that it is possible to use the scientific method to investigate complex and significant social phenomena without reducing them to the mechanistic connections between stimulus and response that were the basis of behaviorism. Festinger proposed the groundbreaking theory of cognitive dissonance that has become the foundation of selective exposure theory today despite the fact that Festinger was considered as an "avant-garde" psychologist when he had first proposed it in 1957. In an ironic twist, Festinger realized that he himself was a victim of the effects of selective exposure. He was a heavy smoker his entire life and when he was diagnosed with terminal cancer in 1989, he was said to have joked, "Make sure that everyone knows that it wasn't lung cancer!" Cognitive dissonance theory explains that when a person either consciously or unconsciously realizes conflicting attitudes, thoughts, or beliefs, they experience mental discomfort. Because of this, an individual will avoid such conflicting information in the future since it produces this discomfort, and they will gravitate towards messages sympathetic to their own previously held conceptions. Decision makers are unable to evaluate information quality independently on their own (Fischer, Jonas, Dieter & Kastenmüller, 2008). When there is a conflict between pre-existing views and information encountered, individuals will experience an unpleasant and self-threatening state of aversive-arousal which will motivate them to reduce it through selective exposure. They will begin to prefer information that supports their original decision and neglect conflicting information. Individuals will then exhibit confirmatory information to defend their positions and reach the goal of dissonance reduction. Cognitive dissonance theory insists that dissonance is a psychological state of tension that people are motivated to reduce (Festinger 1957). Dissonance causes feelings of unhappiness, discomfort, or distress. Festinger (1957, p. 13) asserted the following: "These two elements are in a dissonant relation if, considering these two alone, the obverse of one element would follow from the other." To reduce dissonance, people add consonant cognition or change evaluations for one or both conditions in order to make them more consistent mentally. Such experience of psychological discomfort was found to drive individuals to avoid counterattitudinal information as a dissonance-reduction strategy.

In Festinger's theory, there are two basic hypotheses:

1) The existence of dissonance, being psychologically uncomfortable, will motivate the person to try to reduce the dissonance and achieve consonance.

2) When dissonance is present, in addition to trying to reduce it, the person will actively avoid situations and information which would likely increase the dissonance (Festinger 1957, p. 3).

The theory of cognitive dissonance was developed in the mid-1950s to explain why people of strong convictions are so resistant in changing their beliefs even in the face of undeniable contradictory evidence. It occurs when people feel an attachment to and responsibility for a decision, position or behavior. It increases the motivation to justify their positions through selective exposure to confirmatory information (Fischer, 2011). Fischer suggested that people have an inner need to ensure that their beliefs and behaviors are consistent. In an experiment that employed commitment manipulations, it impacted perceived decision certainty. Participants were free to choose attitude-consistent and inconsistent information to write an essay. Those who wrote an attitude-consistent essay showed higher levels of confirmatory information search (Fischer, 2011). The levels and magnitude of dissonance also play a role. Selective exposure to consistent information is likely under certain levels of dissonance. At high levels, a person is expected to seek out information that increases dissonance because the best strategy to reduce dissonance would be to alter one's attitude or decision (Smith et al., 2008).

Subsequent research on selective exposure within the dissonance theory produced weak empirical support until the dissonance theory was revised and new methods, more conducive to measuring selective exposure, were implemented. To date, scholars still argue that empirical results supporting the selective exposure hypothesis are still mixed. This is possibly due to the problems with the methods of the experimental studies conducted. Another possible reason for the mixed results may be the failure to simulate an authentic media environment in the experiments.

According to Festinger, the motivation to seek or avoid information depends on the magnitude of dissonance experienced (Smith et al., 2008). It is observed that there is a tendency for people to seek new information or select information that supports their beliefs in order to reduce dissonance. There exist three possibilities which will affect extent of dissonance (Festinger 1957, pp. 127–131):

- Relative absence of dissonance.

When little or no dissonance exists, there is little or no motivation to seek new information. For example, when there is an absence of dissonance, the lack of motivation to attend or avoid a lecture on 'The Advantages of Automobiles with Very High Horsepower Engines' will be independent of whether the car a new owner has recently purchased has a high or low horsepower engine. However, there is a difference between a situation when there is no dissonance and when the information has no relevance to the present or future behavior. For the latter, accidental exposure, which the new car owner does not avoid, will not introduce any dissonance; while for the former individual, who also does not avoid information, dissonance may be accidentally introduced.

- The presence of moderate amounts of dissonance.

The existence of dissonance and consequent pressure to reduce it will lead to an active search of information, which will then lead people to avoid information that will increase dissonance. However, when faced with a potential source of information, there will be an ambiguous cognition to which a subject will react in terms of individual expectations about it. If the subject expects the cognition to increase dissonance, they will avoid it. In the event that one's expectations are proven wrong, the attempt at dissonance reduction may result in increasing it instead. It may in turn lead to a situation of active avoidance.

- The presence of extremely large amounts of dissonance.

If two cognitive elements exist in a dissonant relationship, the magnitude of dissonance matches the resistance to change. If the dissonance becomes greater than the resistance to change, then the least resistant elements of cognition will be changed, reducing dissonance. When dissonance is close to the maximum limit, one may actively seek out and expose oneself to dissonance-increasing information. If an individual can increase dissonance to the point where it is greater than the resistance to change, he will change the cognitive elements involved, reducing or even eliminating dissonance. Once dissonance is increased sufficiently, an individual may bring himself to change, hence eliminating all dissonance (Festinger 1957, pp. 127–131).

The reduction in cognitive dissonance following a decision can be achieved by selectively looking for decision-consonant information and avoiding contradictory information. The objective is to reduce the discrepancy between the cognitions, but the specification of which strategy will be chosen is not explicitly addressed by the dissonance theory. It will be dependent on the quantity and quality of the information available inside and outside the cognitive system.

=== Klapper's selective exposure ===
In the early 1960s, Columbia University researcher Joseph T. Klapper asserted in his book The Effects Of Mass Communication that audiences were not passive targets of political and commercial propaganda from mass media but that mass media reinforces previously held convictions. Throughout the book, he argued that the media has a small amount of power to influence people and, most of the time, it just reinforces our preexisting attitudes and beliefs. He argued that the media effects of relaying or spreading new public messages or ideas were minimal because there is a wide variety of ways in which individuals filter such content. Due to this tendency, Klapper argued that media content must be able to ignite some type of cognitive activity in an individual in order to communicate its message. Prior to Klapper's research, the prevailing opinion was that mass media had a substantial power to sway individual opinion and that audiences were passive consumers of prevailing media propaganda. However, by the time of the release of The Effects of Mass Communication, many studies led to a conclusion that many specifically targeted messages were completely ineffective. Klapper's research showed that individuals gravitated towards media messages that bolstered previously held convictions that were set by peer groups, societal influences, and family structures and that the accession of these messages over time did not change when presented with more recent media influence. Klapper noted from the review of research in the social science that given the abundance of content within the mass media, audiences were selective to the types of programming that they consumed. Adults would patronize media that was appropriate for their demographics and children would eschew media that was boring to them. So individuals would either accept or reject a mass media message based upon internal filters that were innate to that person.

The following are Klapper's five mediating factors and conditions to affect people:

- Predispositions and the related processes of selective exposure, selective perception, and selective retention.
- The groups, and the norms of groups, to which the audience members belong.
- Interpersonal dissemination of the content of communication
- The exercise of opinion leadership
- The nature of mass media in a free enterprise society.

Three basic concepts:

- Selective exposure – people keep away from communication of opposite hue.
- Selective perception – If people are confronting unsympathetic material, they do not perceive it, or make it fit for their existing opinion.
- Selective retention – refers to the process of categorizing and interpreting information in a way that favors one category or interpretation over another. Furthermore, they just simply forget the unsympathetic material.

Groups and group norms work as mediators. For example, one can be strongly disinclined to change to the Democratic Party if their family has voted Republican for a long time. In this case, the person's predisposition to the political party is already set, so they don't perceive information about Democratic Party or change voting behavior because of mass communication. Klapper's third assumption is inter-personal dissemination of mass communication. If someone is already exposed by close friends, which creates predisposition toward something, it will lead to an increase in exposure to mass communication and eventually reinforce the existing opinion. An opinion leader is also a crucial factor to form one's predisposition and can lead someone to be exposed by mass communication. The nature of commercial mass media also leads people to select certain types of media contents.

=== Cognitive economy model ===
This new model combines the motivational and cognitive processes of selective exposure. In the past, selective exposure had been studied from a motivational standpoint. For instance, the reason behind the existence of selective exposure was that people felt motivated to decrease the level of dissonance they felt while encountering inconsistent information. They also felt motivated to defend their decisions and positions, so they achieved this goal by exposing themselves to consistent information only. However, the new cognitive economy model not only takes into account the motivational aspects, but it also focuses on the cognitive processes of each individual. For instance, this model proposes that people cannot evaluate the quality of inconsistent information objectively and fairly because they tend to store more of the consistent information and use this as their reference point. Thus, inconsistent information is often observed with a more critical eye in comparison to consistent information. According to this model, the levels of selective exposure experienced during the decision-making process are also dependent on how much cognitive energy people are willing to invest. Just as people tend to be careful with their finances, cognitive energy or how much time they are willing to spend evaluating all the evidence for their decisions works the same way. People are hesitant to use this energy; they tend to be careful so they don't waste it. Thus, this model suggests that selective exposure does not happen in separate stages. Rather, it is a combined process of the individuals' certain acts of motivations and their management of the cognitive energy.

== Implications ==
=== Media ===
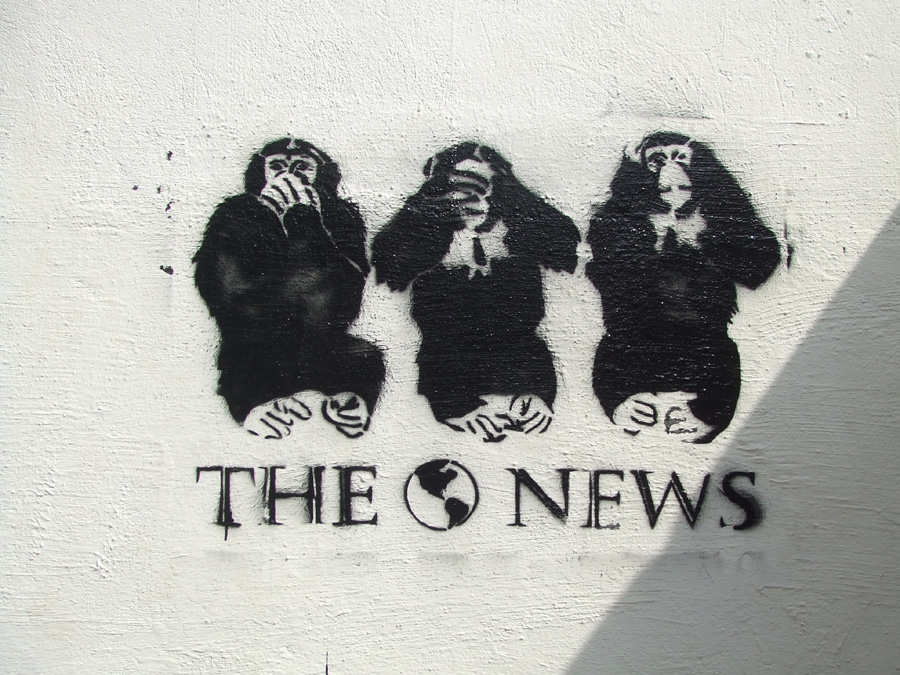
Individuals tailor their media choices to avoid cognitive dissonance and avoid mental incongruity.

Recent studies have shown relevant empirical evidence for the pervasive influence of selective exposure on the greater population at large due to mass media. Researchers have found that individual media consumers will seek out programs to suit their individual emotional and cognitive needs. Individuals will seek out palliative forms of media during the recent times of economic crisis to fulfill a "strong surveillance need" and to decrease chronic dissatisfaction with life circumstances as well as fulfill needs for companionship. Consumers tend to select media content that exposes and confirms their own ideas while avoiding information that argues against their opinion. A study conducted in 2012 has shown that this type of selective exposure affects pornography consumption as well. Individuals with low levels of life satisfaction are more likely to have casual sex after consumption of pornography that is congruent with their attitudes while disregarding content that challenges their inherently permissive 'no strings attached' attitudes.

Music selection is also affected by selective exposure. A 2014 study conducted by Christa L. Taylor and Ronald S. Friedman at the SUNY University at Albany, found that mood congruence was effected by self-regulation of music mood choices. Subjects in the study chose happy music when feeling angry or neutral but listened to sad music when they themselves were sad. The choice of sad music given a sad mood was due less to mood-mirroring but as a result of subjects having an aversion to listening to happy music that was cognitively dissonant with their mood.

Politics are more likely to inspire selective exposure among consumers as opposed to single exposure decisions. For example, in their 2009 meta-analysis of Selective Exposure Theory, Hart et al. reported that "A 2004 survey by The Pew Research Center for the People & the Press (2006) found that Republicans are about 1.5 times more likely to report watching Fox News regularly than are Democrats (34% for Republicans and 20% of Democrats). In contrast, Democrats are 1.5 times more likely to report watching CNN regularly than Republicans (28% of Democrats vs. 19% of Republicans). Even more striking, Republicans are approximately five times more likely than Democrats to report watching "The O'Reilly Factor" regularly and are seven times more likely to report listening to "Rush Limbaugh" regularly." As a result, when the opinions of Republicans who only tune into conservative media outlets were compared to those of their fellow conservatives in a study by Stroud (2010), their beliefs were considered to be more polarized. The same result was retrieved from the study of liberals as well. Due to our greater tendency toward selective exposure, current political campaigns have been characterized as being extremely partisan and polarized. As Bennett and Iyengar (2008) commented, "The new, more diversified information environment makes it not only more feasible for consumers to seek out news they might find agreeable but also provides a strong economic incentive for news organizations to cater to their viewers' political preferences." Selective exposure thus plays a role in shaping and reinforcing individuals' political attitudes. In the context of these findings, Stroud (2008) comments "The findings presented here should at least raise the eyebrows of those concerned with the noncommercial role of the press in our democratic system, with its role in providing the public with the tools to be good citizens." The role of public broadcasting, through its noncommercial role, is to counterbalance media outlets that deliberately devote their coverage to one political direction, thus driving selective exposure and political division in a democracy.

Many academic studies on selective exposure, however, are based on the electoral system and media system of the United States. Countries with a strong public service broadcasting like many European countries, on the other hand, have less selective exposure based on political ideology or political party. In Sweden, for instance, there were no differences in selective exposure to public service news between the political left and right over a period of 30 years.

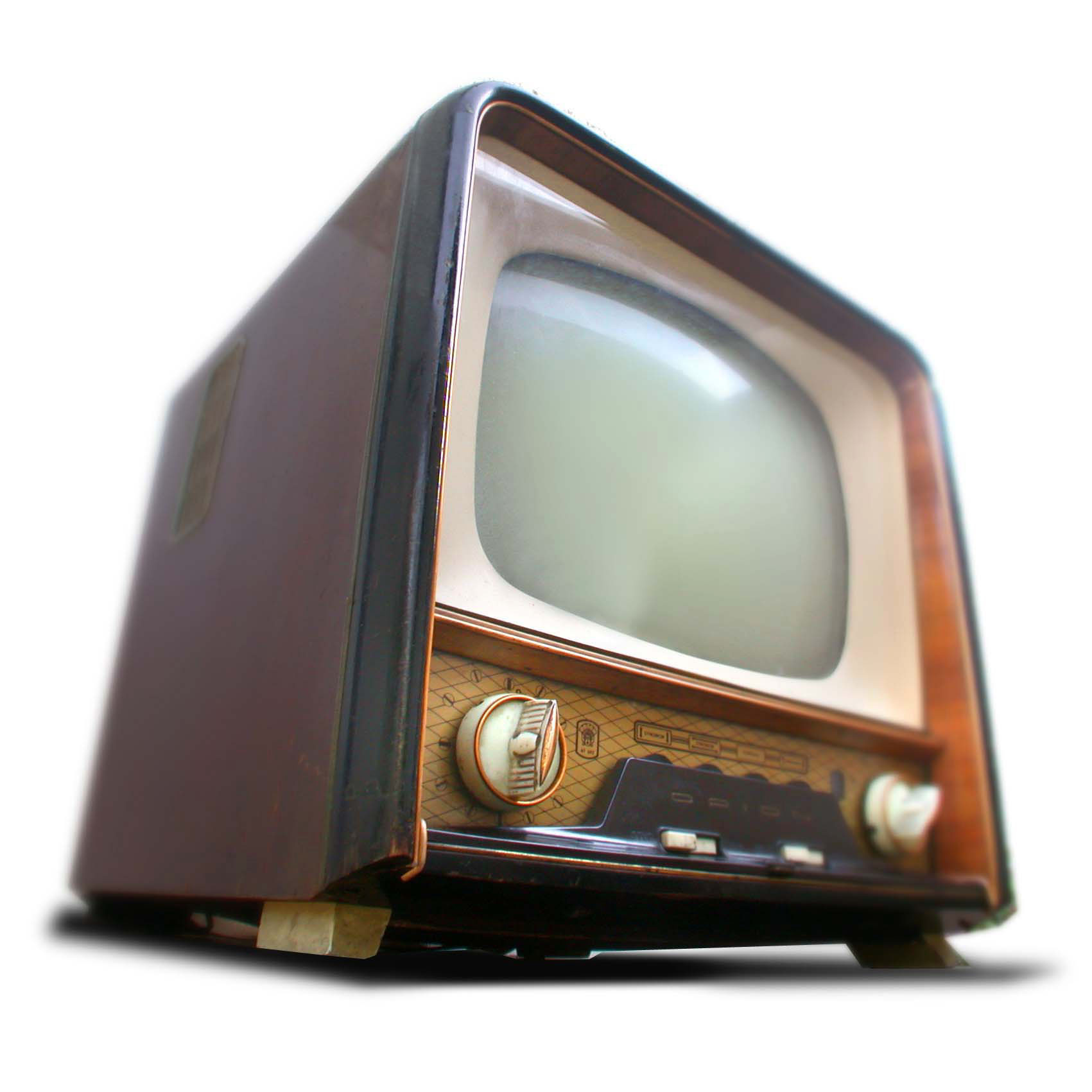
Television is the most pervasive conduit of selective exposure in modern society.

In early research, selective exposure originally provided an explanation for limited media effects. The "limited effects" model of communication emerged in the 1940s with a shift in the media effects paradigm. This shift suggested that while the media has effects on consumers' behavior such as their voting behavior, these effects are limited and influenced indirectly by interpersonal discussions and the influence of opinion leaders. Selective exposure was considered one necessary function in the early studies of media's limited power over citizens' attitudes and behaviors. Political ads deal with selective exposure as well because people are more likely to favor a politician that agrees with their own beliefs. Another significant effect of selective exposure comes from Stroud (2010) who analyzed the relationship between partisan selective exposure and political polarization. Using data from the 2004 National Annenberg Election Survey, analysts found that over time partisan selective exposure leads to polarization. This process is plausible because people can easily create or have access to blogs, websites, chats, and online forums where those with similar views and political ideologies can congregate. Much of the research has also shown that political interaction online tends to be polarized. Further evidence for this polarization in the political blogosphere can be found in the Lawrence et al. (2010)'s study on blog readership that people tend to read blogs that reinforce rather than challenge their political beliefs. According to Cass Sunstein's book, Republic.com, the presence of selective exposure on the web creates an environment that breeds political polarization and extremism. Due to easy access to social media and other online resources, people are "likely to hold even stronger views than the ones they started with, and when these views are problematic, they are likely to manifest increasing hatred toward those espousing contrary beliefs." This illustrates how selective exposure can influence an individual's political beliefs and subsequently his participation in the political system.

One of the major academic debates on the concept of selective exposure is whether selective exposure contributes to people's exposure to diverse viewpoints or polarization. Scheufele and Nisbet (2012) discuss the effects of encountering disagreement on democratic citizenship. Ideally, true civil deliberation among citizens would be the rational exchange of non-like-minded views (or disagreement). However, many of us tend to avoid disagreement on a regular basis because we do not like to confront with others who hold views that are strongly opposed to our own. In this sense, the authors question about whether exposure to non-like-minded information brings either positive or negative effects on democratic citizenship. While there are mixed findings of peoples' willingness to participate in the political processes when they encounter disagreement, the authors argue that the issue of selectivity needs to be further examined in order to understand whether there is a truly deliberative discourse in online media environment.

Experimental evidence indicates that exposure to politically diverse information does not necessarily reduce polarization. In a 2026 pre-registered experiment during the 2019 Argentine presidential debate, Twitter users assigned to interact with an experimenter-run account providing a balanced mix of partisan content did not become less polarized; among users embedded in politically segregated online environments, the intervention increased polarization and physiological stress.

== See also ==
- Algorithmic radicalization – Radicalization via social media algorithms
- Attitude polarization – Tendency of a group to make more extreme decisions than the inclinations of its members
- Cherry picking
- Communal reinforcement – Social phenomenon
- Echo chamber – Situation that reinforces beliefs by repetition inside a closed system
- Filter bubble – Intellectual isolation through internet algorithms
- Group polarization – Tendency of a group to make more extreme decisions than the inclinations of its members
- Low-information rationality – Psychological problem-solving tendency
- Media consumption – Usage of media
- Reinforcement theory
- Russell's teapot – Analogy devised by Bertrand Russell
- Selection bias
- Solipsism – Philosophical idea that only one's own mind is certain to exist
- Truthiness – Belief in truth based on only intuition
- Voldemort effect
