= Voldemort effect =

Social phenomenon

The Voldemort effect is a social phenomenon where people are fearful of naming someone, to speak of something or acknowledge it exists, and therefore derail any attempt to confront it. The phrase takes cue from the line associated with Lord Voldemort in the Harry Potter series: 'he who must not be named', because they are terrified to name him or they deny his existence.

== History of usage ==
The earliest usage of "Voldemort effect" was in an Australian infant health research in 2008 which reported that formula feeding was seldom named in publication titles or abstracts as a health risk factor for babies.

Matthew Yglesias, writing in 2011 and attributing its coinage to Julian Sanchez, defined the term with regards to American politics, using it to describe the pride political partisans, particularly those on the right, take in political figures of their own side who possess the ability to "drive the other side crazy."

In a 2013 Christian book, Holding Your Family Together by American author Rich Melheim, the term was used by;those who do not want speak the name of something that is frightening them or causing problems to them. The author encouraged the reader "to name that sucker out loud ... We are going to call him what he is and who he is so that we can deal with real problem, not the myth", because after mentioning the unspeakable name, "The moment the silence is broken, the power starts to drain away from its sinister source and move in the direction of those who dare deal with it.

=== Islam ===
In July 2015, the term was used by British counter-terrorism expert Haras Rafiq, who remarked that Islamic extremism is treated like a "Lord Voldermort" taboo topic in the United Kingdom, whereby, according to him, the failure to label and condemn Islamist ideology (by western leaders) for what it is has encouraged young people to join ISIS. Rafiq stated, "it has so far very much been a Voldemort effect – he who shall not be named – with no-one actually coming out and saying it is an Islamist ideology."

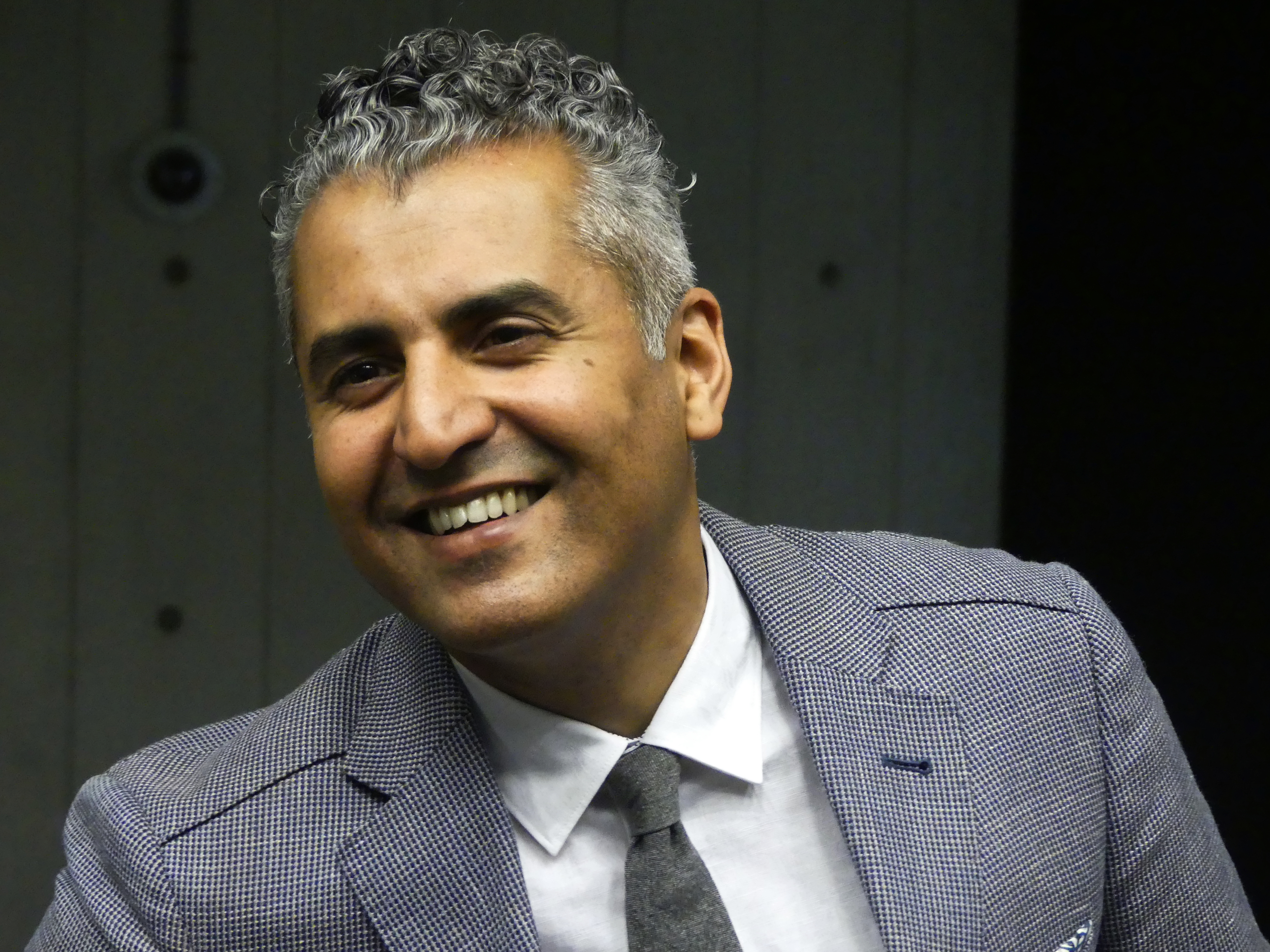
Maajid Nawaz, the British activist who used the term in 2015

The expression was used by British activist Maajid Nawaz in 2015, where he applied it for analysts, experts, social commentators and politicians, among others, who are fearful or hesitant to call out the ideology of Islamism as the underlying cause of Jihadist terrorism.

Nawaz stated that people refusing to acknowledge radical Islam are comparable to members of Hogwarts who refuse to mention Voldemort's name, and by declining to name him, they forestall an open discussion from taking place about an accomplishable solution, which therefore exacerbates the situation, causes more dread and panic, and further glorifies the myth of his powerful nature. Majid says: "Refusing to name a problem, and failing to recognize it, is never a good way to solve it".

"I call this the Voldemort effect, after the villain in J.K. Rowling's Harry Potter books. Many well-meaning people in Ms. Rowling's fictional world are so petrified of Voldemort's evil that they do two things: They refuse to call Voldemort by name, instead referring to 'He Who Must Not Be Named,' and they deny that he exists in the first place. Such dread only increases public hysteria, thus magnifying the appeal of Voldemort's power."

— Maajid Nawaz, quoted in My Origin, My Destiny Christianity's Basic "Value Proposition"

After Nawaz's use of the phrase in 2015, it has since been used to criticize mainly left-wingers who vociferously condemn any legitimate criticism of Islam and instead bring up whataboutisms such as the Crusades, with some even going far as blaming those who have fell victim to Islamic extremism after mocking the religion (such as the Charlie Hebdo cartoonists).

According to secularist blogger Brian Morris, this position has influenced the term 'Voldemort effect'; in the Harry Potter series it is a taboo to mention the Dark Wizard's name, and the taboo in this situation is to merely state that Islamic fascism is a "politicized religion" that should be open for criticism.

== See also ==
- Avoidance speech – Sociolinguistic phenomena
- Algospeak – Obfuscated speech on social media
- Denialism – Rejecting scientific or historical consensus
- Elephant in the room – English idiom
- Open secret – Generally known but officially unacknowledged information
- Ostrich effect – Attempt made by investors to avoid negative financial information
- Polite fiction – Known falsehood a group shares for politeness
- Regressive left – Pejorative term for overly tolerant left-wing politics
- Selective exposure – Theory within the practice of psychology
- Streisand effect – Increased awareness of something after efforts to suppress it
- Taboo – Societal or cultural prohibition
