= Elephant in the room =

English idiom

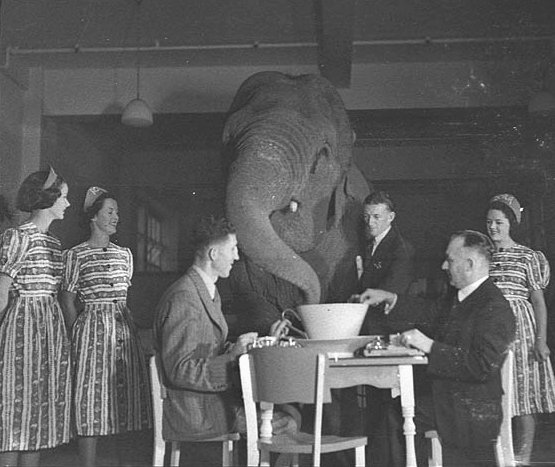
A literal elephant in a room, attending a tea party in Sydney, Australia (1939). In the metaphor, such an elephant represents an obvious but unacknowledged issue.

The expression "the elephant in the room" (or "the elephant in the living room") is an English language idiom for an obvious problem or difficult situation that is left undiscussed due to its awkward or controversial nature. It is based on the idea and thought that something as conspicuous as an elephant can appear to be overlooked in codified social interactions and that the sociology and psychology of repression also operates on the macro scale.

== Origins ==
In 1814, Ivan Krylov (1769–1844), poet and fabulist, wrote a fable entitled "The Inquisitive Man", which tells of a man who goes to a museum and notices all sorts of tiny things, but fails to notice an elephant. The phrase became proverbial. Fyodor Dostoevsky in his novel Demons wrote, "Belinsky was just like Krylov's Inquisitive Man, who didn't notice the elephant in the museum...."

The Oxford English Dictionary gives the first recorded use of the phrase, as a simile, in The New York Times on 20 June 1959: "Financing schools has become a problem about equal to having an elephant in the living room. It's so big you just can't ignore it." According to the website the Phrase Finder, the first known use in print is from 1952.

This idiomatic expression may have been in general use much earlier than 1959. For example, the phrase appears 44 years earlier in the pages of the British Journal of Education in 1915. The sentence was presented as a trivial illustration of a question British schoolboys would be able to answer, e.g., "Is there an elephant in the class-room?"

The first widely disseminated conceptual reference was a story written by Mark Twain in 1882, "The Stolen White Elephant", which recounts the inept, far-ranging activities of detectives trying to find an elephant that was right on the spot after all. This story, combined with Dostoyevsky's white bear, may have been on Jerome Frank's mind when he wrote in his dissent in United States v. Antonelli Fireworks (1946) and again in dissent in United States v. Leviton (1951) of "the Mark Twain story of the little boy who was told to stand in a corner and not to think of a white elephant."

The phrase may also be a response to philosopher Alfred North Whitehead's 1929 description of the validity of immediate experience: "Sometimes we see an elephant, and sometimes we do not. The result is that an elephant, when present, is noticed."

In 1935, comedian Jimmy Durante starred on Broadway in the Billy Rose Broadway musical Jumbo, in which a police officer stops him as he leads a live elephant and asks, "What are you doing with that elephant?" Durante's reply, "What elephant?" was a regular show-stopper. Durante reprises the piece in the 1962 film version of the play, Billy Rose's Jumbo.

== Usage ==
The term refers to a question, problem, solution, or controversial issue which is obvious to everyone who knows about the situation, but which is deliberately ignored because to do otherwise would cause great embarrassment, sadness, arguments, or is simply taboo. The idiom can imply a value judgment that the issue ought to be discussed openly, or it can simply be an acknowledgment that the issue is there and not going to go away by itself.

The term is often used to describe an issue that involves a social taboo or which generates disagreement, such as race, religion, politics, homosexuality, mental illness, or suicide. It is applicable when a subject is emotionally charged, and the people who might have spoken up decide that it is probably best avoided.

The idiom is commonly used in addiction recovery terminology to describe the reluctance of friends and family of an addicted person to discuss the person's problem, thus aiding the person's denial. Especially in reference to intoxication, the idiom is sometimes coupled with that of the pink elephant, "the pink elephant in the room."

The expression has also been used as a metaphorical idiom in Spanish. In 1994, the 8000 Process was a legal investigation of a Colombian presidential campaign. There were accusations that the campaign of Colombian Liberal Party candidate Ernesto Samper was partially funded with drug money from the Cali Cartel. Insisting on his innocence, Samper stated that if drug money had entered the presidential campaign, it had done so "behind his back". Cardinal Pedro Rubiano, a leader of Colombia's Catholic Church, stated in an interview that not knowing that drug money financed part of the presidential campaign was similar to not noticing "an elephant entering one's living room". Since then, the events that led to drug money financing the "Samper for President" campaign have been referred to as "The Elephant."

The title of Alan Clarke's 1989 television film Elephant references the term.

Graffiti artist Banksy, in his 2006 Los Angeles show Barely Legal, included a live elephant painted to match the wallpaper as a literal presentation of the concept.

Alexandra Burke's 2012 single "Elephant" also uses the concept. Burke incorrectly claimed to have brought the phrase to the United Kingdom from the United States.

Terry Kettering's named his poem The Elephant in the Room. In a November 2013 edition of Time magazine, New Jersey governor Chris Christie was labeled as the "Elephant in the Room" on the cover page.

=== Similar ===
A variation of the phrase is "elephant in the corner", which is used to the same effect less frequently.

Logician and philosopher Ludwig Wittgenstein used an example of a rhinoceros in the room to show either the impossibility of disproving negative existential statements or perhaps a more subtle philosophical point.

== See also ==
- 800-pound gorilla – Genus of large African apes
- Awareness – State of knowing or noticing something
- Barely Legal (Banksy) – 2006 show by graffiti artist Banksy, featuring a literal interpretation of the idom
- Blind men and an elephant – Parable illustrating ontological reasoning
- Elephant joke – Type of absurd joke involving an elephant
- Elephant test – Classification based on observable evidence
- Ironic process theory ("Don't think of a pink elephant")
- Nigger in the woodpile – Expression meaning something suspicious or wrong
- Open secret – Generally known but officially unacknowledged information
- Ostrich effect – Attempt made by investors to avoid negative financial information
- Polite fiction – Known falsehood a group shares for politeness
- Seeing pink elephants
- Skeleton in the closet – Undisclosed negative fact about someone
- Taboo – Societal or cultural prohibition
- The Elephant in the Living Room, 2011 documentary
- The Emperor's New Clothes – 1837 fairy tale by Hans Christian Andersen
- The Invisible Gorilla, 2010 book by Christopher Chabris & Daniel Simons
- Third rail of politics – Metaphor for "untouchable" issues
- Unsaid – Term referring to a social behaviour
- Voldemort effect, a term popularized by Maajid Nawaz with similar meaning
- White elephant – Expensive object that cannot be disposed of

== Bibliography ==
- Cambridge University Press. (2009). Cambridge academic content dictionary (Paul Heacock, editor). New York: Cambridge University Press. ISBN 978-0-521-87143-3/ISBN 978-0-521-69196-3; OCLC 183392531
- Dostoyevsky, Fyodor. (1994). Demons: a novel in three parts (Richard Pevear and Larissa Volokhonsky, translators). London: Vintage. ISBN 0-09-914001-2
- __________. (1915). Journal of education, Vol. 37. Oxford: Oxford University Press. OCLC 1713625
- Palta, Namrata. (2007). Spoken English: a Detailed and Simplified Course for Learning Spoken English. New Delhi: Lotus Press. ISBN 978-8-183-82052-3; OCLC 297508439
