= Barely Legal (Banksy) =

2006 show by graffiti artist Banksy

Barely Legal was a show by graffiti artist Banksy, held in an industrial warehouse in Los Angeles, California, in 2006. The free show was held over the weekend of 16 September 2006.

Part of the exhibition was a 37-year-old Indian elephant that was painted to match the wallpaper of the room in which it was placed. The show was meant to address important issues such as poverty, which is ignored by most people; the animal was a literal representation of the "elephant in the room".

While in Los Angeles, the artist also targeted Disneyland in Anaheim, where he placed a replica of a Guantanamo Bay detainee inside the Big Thunder Mountain Railroad ride, intending to draw attention to the situation in the detention camp, where several months earlier three inmates had committed suicide. The figure was taken down after approximately 90 minutes. A video of the artist placing the figure in the theme park could also be seen at the exhibition.

== See also ==
- 2006 in art
- List of works by Banksy
