= Phil Hansen (artist) =

American artist

- Born: 1979 (age 46–47)
- Education: Northwest College of Art
- Occupation: Artist

Phil Hansen (born 1979) is a self-taught American artist.

== Biography ==
During high school, Hansen's obsession with pointillism resulted in permanent nerve damage. Out of frustration, Hansen left art and art school, but, after speaking to his neurologist, decided to explore other forms of art, both two- and three-dimensional. Hansen dropped out of college after two terms, and his only formal art education is from high school.

== Career ==
Hansen's breakthrough piece was a time-lapse video of a two-day project called Influence. He painted thirty pictures on his torso, one over the other, each picture representing an influence in his life. After it was completed, he peeled the layer off and cut a silhouette of his own profile. The uploaded video was streamed over a million times on the Internet, with process and final piece clearly revealed.

== Grammy Awards ==
Hansen was chosen to be the official Artist for 51st annual Grammy Awards held on February 8, 2009 8 pm ET.
