= Janks Morton =

American film director

Janks Morton, Jr. (born August 18, 1963, Cincinnati, Ohio), is an American filmmaker, author, activist, director, producer, editor, and cinematographer. Morton currently lives in Atlanta, Georgia.

== Education ==
Morton received his Bachelor of Science from Bowie State University with a major in Business and Industrial Psychology.

== Career ==
Morton is the founder and CEO of iYAGO Entertainment Group, an independently owned and operated multimedia production company. Morton created iYAGO Entertainment Group, "...to reflect both the conscious and unconscious soul of Black America." Morton has been in the entertainment industry for 20 years. Morton's sole proprietorship is responsible for releasing four feature-length documentary films since 2007. His first feature-length documentary, What Black Men Think, was voted the Best Black Documentary of the year for 2007 and Morton was voted Best Director for 2007. The film examines the role of stereotypes and misrepresentations in America.

What Black Men Think has garnered national media attention and is distributed nationally by Passion River Media and Amazon. Morton has traveled internationally and nationally to lecture and show his films. He has convened workshops, seminars and served as a panelist and keynote speaker at universities, prisons, conferences, churches and community centers around the world. Morton's states his motivation for becoming a filmmaker is to promote the positive stories about blacks. Morton has been described as an, "expert at healing conversations". Morton's film style is categorized as "docu-logue".

== Filmography (producing and directing) ==
=== Feature documentaries ===
Hoodwinked (2012)
Dear Daddy (2011)
Guilty Until Proven Innocent (2010)
We Need to Talk (2010)
What Black Men Think (2007)

=== Short documentaries ===
Men to Boys (2009)
