= Hostile media effect =

Perception of balanced news coverage as biased

The hostile media effect is the tendency for people with strong opinions on opposite sides of a controversial issue to both perceive identical news coverage as unfairly biased against their own position. The hostile media effect is largely responsible for the declining trust in news, as it reveals how perceived news bias is oftentimes because of the audience's bias rather than the news coverage.

Studies on the hostile media effect have also found that the more knowledgeable the person is on a topic, the stronger their hostile media effect is.

Since it was first studied in the early 1980s by Robert Vallone, Lee Ross and Mark Lepper., the hostile media effect has become a foundational concept in political communication and media communications studies.

== Studies ==
In 1982, the second major study of this phenomenon was undertaken when pro-Palestinian students and pro-Israeli students at Stanford University were shown the same news filmstrips of the then-recent Sabra and Shatila massacre.

First, each partisan group evaluated the fairness of the media's sample of facts and arguments differently: in light of their own divergent views about the objective merits of each side's case and their corresponding views about the nature of unbiased coverage. Second, each group reported more negative references to their side than positive ones, and each predicted that the coverage would sway nonpartisans in a hostile direction. Within both partisan groups, furthermore, greater knowledge of the crisis was associated with stronger perceptions of media bias. Both sides said a neutral observer would have a more negative view of their side from viewing the clips, and that the media would have excused the other side where it blamed their side.

Subsequent studies have found hostile media effects related to other political conflicts, such as strife in Bosnia, immigration in the U.S. and in U.S. presidential elections, as well as in other areas, such as media coverage of the South Korean National Security Act, the 1997 United Parcel Service Teamsters strike, genetically modified food, and sports.

The effect was originally dubbed "hostile media phenomenon" by Vallone et al., and is occasionally referred to as "hostile media perception," since it seems to precipitate the effects of media. In a 2015 meta-analysis of the subject, Perloff said "hostile media effect" is the most often used term:

The most common term is "hostile media effect," perhaps because scholars appreciate that the "effect" term cuts to the heart of the mass communication research enterprise and captures the theoretically intriguing aspect of the hostile media phenomenon. (703)

The effect appears to be something of a disconfirmation bias, or "a contrast bias – a deviation of judgment in which a partisan individual perceives or evaluates media content to be further away, in terms of valence, from his or her own point of view." In other words, the intention of the reporter or the story is irrelevant – those "partisans" who consume the content find the content that is hostile to their point of view on their own.

An oft-cited forerunner to Vallone et al.'s study was conducted by Albert Hastorf and Hadley Cantril in 1954. Princeton and Dartmouth students were shown a filmstrip of a controversial Princeton-Dartmouth football game. Asked to count the number of infractions committed by both sides, students at both universities "saw" many more infractions committed by the opposing side, in addition to making different generalizations about the game. Hastorf and Cantril concluded that "there is no such 'thing' as a 'game' existing 'out there' in its own right which people merely 'observe.' ... For the 'thing' simply is not the same for different people whether the 'thing' is a football game, a presidential candidate, Communism, or spinach."

== Causes ==
=== Cognitive ===
There are three cognitive mechanisms that are commonly attributed to the hostile media effect.

==== Selective recall ====
Selective recall refers to memory and retrieval. In instances of the hostile media effect, partisans should tend to remember more of the disconfirming portions of a message than the parts that support their position, in a variation of the negativity effect. Vallone and his colleagues observed selective recall differing along partisan lines even on simple, objective criteria such as the number of references to a given subject. However, numerous studies have documented the hostile media effect even when selective recall is positive rather than negative.

==== Selective perception ====
Selective perception refers to the process by which individuals perceive what they want to in media messages while ignoring opposing viewpoints. In instances of the hostile media effect, partisans have a heightened tendency to interpret aspects of a message as unfavorable – or hostile – as opposed to categorizations by non-partisans. In other words, selective perception is a form of bias because we interpret information in a way that is congruent with our existing values and beliefs.

==== Motivated reasoning from prejudices ====
The different standards explanation or motivated reasoning refers to the validity of arguments. This is confirmation bias taken to the next level. It leads people to confirm what they already believe, while ignoring contrary data. But it also drives people to develop elaborate rationalizations to justify holding beliefs that logic and evidence have shown to be wrong. Motivated reasoning responds defensively to contrary evidence, actively discrediting such evidence or its source without logical or evidentiary justification. It seems to be assumed by social scientists that motivated reasoning is driven by a desire to avoid cognitive dissonance. It suggests that reason partisans are so prone to see an unbiased message in a hostile light is because of the strength of the favorable argument they have built in their minds over time. Rather than seeing confirmation bias as an opposite force of hostile media effect, the different standards explanation sees it as a contributing force. As Vallone et al. noted in the seminal study:

Partisans who have consistently processed facts and arguments in light of their preconceptions and prejudices [...] are bound to believe that the preponderance of reliable, pertinent evidence favors their viewpoint. Accordingly, to the extent that the small sample of evidence and argument featured in a media presentation seems unrepresentative of this larger "population" of information, perceivers will charge bias in the presentation and will be likely to infer hostility and bias on the part of those responsible for it.

These criteria allow for specific measures beyond subjective generalizations about the news coverage as a whole, such as what might be expressed as "I thought that the news has been generally biased against this side of the issue." The research suggests the hostile media effect is not just a difference of opinion but a difference of perception (selective perception).

=== Source factors ===
Characteristics of the message source may also influence the hostile media effect. A source perceived to be friendly to the partisan (usually because of agreeable ideology or geographic proximity to the group) is less likely to invoke the hostile media effect than a source that is disagreeable or geographically detached. In numerous studies, Albert C. Gunther and his associates have suggested that the ability of mass media to reach a large audience is what triggers the hostile media effect.

Consistently, they found that a message appearing to originate from a newspaper was perceived as hostile by partisans, while an identical message appearing in a student essay was perceived as unbiased, or even favorable toward the partisan cause.

The phenomenon also exists for personalities on television – partisans in a study were found to perceive significantly less bias in a host they perceive as like-minded.

Consistent with a hostile media effect, issue partisans perceived less bias in opinionated news hosts whose viewpoints cohered with their own than did non-partisans and especially partisans on the opposing side of the issue. In most cases, these partisan differences were as big as—if not bigger than—the differences seen in response to non-opinionated news, indicating that even blatant deviations from journalistic norms do not quell partisan selectivity in news perceptions, at least when it comes to perceived bias in the host of opinionated programs.

While partisans can agree on the bias of a particular source, the reasons for that bias appears to account for the difference; that is, consumers on both sides of an issue may see bias in a particular story, but are more likely to attribute that story to a host they perceive as hostile to their own particular cause.

=== Partisanship ===
All of these explanatory mechanisms are influenced by partisanship. From the first studies, the hostile media effect has required an audience of partisans, with stronger beliefs correlating with stronger manifestations of the effect. Increasing devotion to a particular side of an issue leads to increasing levels of biased information processing, whether out of protection of personal values or a strong sense of group affiliation.

== Relative hostile media effect ==
Early hostile media effect studies measured perceptions of a media message designed to be unbiased. As ideologically diversified news outlets became more commonplace, later experiments began to use messages that were less objective. They found that while partisans on both sides of an issue recognized the bias, the group the message opposed perceived a greater degree of bias than the group the message supported. This variation is referred to as the relative hostile media effect, and has been demonstrated in media coverage of the use of primates for lab testing. Gunther et al. said, "the relative hostile media effect occurs when individuals with different attitudes toward the issue exhibit significantly different evaluations of the same media content.”

In fact, as Glass et al. noted in a 2000 study, "partisans tend to see objectively biased articles as 'even-handed' if the bias impugns the opposition group." The study measured the responses of voters who support and oppose abortion rights, finding that "people with more extreme views on abortion sometimes evaluate biased news articles as being fair, but only when the opposing side is being gored."

The effect appears to exist more among conservatives than liberals, according to multiple studies. When randomly assigned either a clip from Comedy Central's The Daily Show (liberal), or a similar program from Fox News (conservative), conservatives perceived significantly more bias in the program than liberal subjects. It is entirely possible that the "relative hostile media effect," in this case, is a function of preconceived biases related to the program itself, rather than the content. In a 1998 study, Dalton et al., found that newspaper readers were best able to detect the partisan stands of their newspapers when the newspaper sent a clear and unambiguous political signal; otherwise, individual partisanship predominated in judgments. Unsurprisingly, studies related to media content that is strictly opinionated – that is, media content that is not intended to be unbiased – have shown that partisans are quite capable of identifying bias in those conditions.

== Moderators ==
=== Reach ===
Gunther and Schmitt attempted to discern why in some cases research subjects faulted ambiguous, contradictory information, and supported it in other cases. One conclusion they suggested was the reach of the publication – that is, the hostile media effect is likely to emerge when participants are estimating the effects on others of mass media with a large reach, but biased assimilation would occur when the participants are judging media with lower reach (in this case, a research report that presumably reaches only people in a particular field).

=== Involvement ===
Hansen and Kim found that involvement is positively correlated with hostile media effect; that is, the effect increases as individuals become more involved with the issue. The study also found a significant effect that emerged with those who have low involvement. Other studies have found high correlations of the effect in value-relevant involvement and in affective involvement.

=== Social identity ===
Social identity theory suggests that media coverage of an ego-involving issue will activate group identity and increase the salience of the issue among members of a group that champions a particular political or social cause. This in turn triggers self-categorization processes, as ingroup members differentiate themselves from their counterparts in the outgroup, seeking to elevate their self-esteem by viewing the ingroup as superior to the disliked outgroup on core dimensions. When exposed to controversial media coverage that contains unfavorable depictions of the ingroup, group members, concerned about the perceived inaccuracy of the portrayals and convinced that the portrayals undermine the group's legitimacy in the larger society, cope by derogating media coverage, viewing it as hostilely biased. In this way, they reduce the symbolic threat and restore valued social self-esteem.

A related potential moderator is the outgroup membership of the message source. Reid found that more politically extreme Democratic students perceived less bias when a polemical assault on their group was attributed to a Democratic (ingroup) organization, but detected more bias when the attack was ascribed to a pro-Republican outgroup.

== Mediators ==
Perloff identified four factors as the reasons those individuals with strong attitudes towards a particular issue, as well as high involvement, might perceive hostile media bias: selective recall, which causes partisans to focus more on contradictory information; selective categorization, in which partisans categorize more content as unfair to their position than fair; different standards, in which partisans classify more of the content that reflects positively on their position as accurate, and information that reflects negatively as inaccurate; and prior beliefs about media bias, in which partisans judge media content unfairly based on a generalized negative set of beliefs about the media in general.

== Hostile media online ==
Research around HME in the digital age is still in relative infancy. Partisan users of online media have abilities to interact with the mass media in a way they have never before. Some may attribute the effects of hostile media in the future to issue-specific social media messages, for example. Relative effects may be higher, however, in the digital media future:

Partisans on both sides could easily agree that a series of posts is biased in one ideological direction, but those whose political ox is being gored should be more likely to presume bias and hostile intent. More generally, anecdotal evidence suggests that individuals perceive that social media messages have strong effects, frequently perceiving that negative communications will have deleterious influences on online third persons. (722)

Indeed, news audiences were found to perceive malicious intent based on their personal political stance, contributing to hostile perceptions with Facebook news messages.

== Consequences ==
=== Persuasive press inference ===
Gunther and Chia invoked the concept of persuasive press inference in a 2001 study, in which individuals form impressions of the direction or slant of news coverage, extrapolate that news in general resembles the news stories they personally viewed, assume that high-reach news influences the public, and therefore presume that public opinion corresponds with the perceived directionality of news. Therefore, those partisans who begin with the belief in a hostile media will conclude that public opinion is opposed to their particular cause. Research for this hypothesis has produced mixed results.

It is not clear if the hostile media effect translates into real-world effects. Some research has explored the ways in which individuals take action to "'correct' perceived 'wrongs'" created by a perceived hostile media depiction of the individuals' group. This research has suggested that these individuals effectively feel disenfranchised, and may react by "defying the dominant public opinion climate, even engaging in undemocratic actions, and other times adopting a more passive approach, withdrawing from functional political or social activities."

=== Motivated fake news perception ===
Tsang has revealed that the hostile media perception can be applied to a fake news context. Partisans from opposing sides were found to perceive the exact same news message to be fake to significantly varying degrees.

== Possible remedies ==
=== Media literacy ===
Studies to determine whether media literacy – competency in analyzing and evaluating messages from mass media – might affect a media consumer's hostile media effect have limited results. In a 2014 study, participants watched a Media Literacy PSA prior to watching manipulated television programs, then asked to rate their perceptions of the relative hostility of the media afterwards. The effects were strong in some areas but less so in others. "Given that the digital media environment allows individuals to select their own media content – and people tend to choose what they find more credible – in some cases a news media literacy message may spur further selection into agreeable political enclaves, now seen as even more credible, and contribute to rising political polarization" (26). Besides media literacy messages, empathy was introduced to news messages to see whether the emotion can reduce HME. People were found to perceive higher levels of media favorability toward their personal position, but not a reduction in media hostility toward the opposing side.

=== Presentation of sources ===
The study titled "Mapping Boundaries of the Hostile Media Effect" by Albert C. Gunther and Kathleen Schmitt propose that the Hostile Media Effect, where partisans perceive neutral media coverage as biased against their views, can be reduced or eliminated by changing the context or source channel used to deliver the information. The HME phenomenon disappeared when participants read identical content about genetically modified (GM) foods presented as a student essay (a nonmedia source), compared to when it was presented as a newspaper story. However, when the content was presented in the essay condition, participants generally judged the persuasiveness of the arguments as almost uniformly favorable to their own point of view, a result consistent with biased assimilation.

== See also ==
- Cognitive bias
- Bias blind spot
- Bunker mentality
- Effects of violence in mass media
- List of cognitive biases
- Media bias in the United States
- Media panic
- Protest paradigm
- Self-serving bias
- Selective perception
- Usage of the "fake news" label in the United States
- Vicarious trauma after viewing media
- Victim mentality
