= Perceptual defense =

Perceptual defense is the act of conceiving and reinforcing one's own biases, perceptions and judgments, and preventing oneself from assimilating other forms of opinions from others. It is associated with the filter theory concept.

== See also ==
- Selective perception
