= Glee club (disambiguation) =

A glee club is a choir that specializes in singing short songs.

Glee Club or The Glee Club may also refer to:

- Glee Club (British politics), an event at the Liberal Democrats conference
- Glee Club (TV series), British talent show
- The Glee Club, a chain of British performance venues
- The Glee Club (band), an Irish band
- The Glee Club, a 2002 play by Richard Cameron
- "Glee Club" (Saved by the Bell), a 1990 television episode

== See also ==
- Glee (music)
- Glee (TV series), an American musical comedy-drama (2009-2015)
- List of collegiate glee clubs
