= Blackvoices.com =

American historical website

Blackvoices.com was an American website with content targeted towards African-American culture. Founded in 1995, by Barry Cooper, it first appeared as a link on the Orlando Sentinel website. After being sold twice, it has become a subsection named Black Voices on the HuffPost website.

== History ==
Early on, website received a five million-dollar investment from Tribune Company, the parent company of the Orlando Sentinel. From there, Blackvoices.com grew and eventually gained over a million registered users. Later, the site was sold to AOL-Time Warner. Although the site had content targeted towards African-American culture, the site was no longer black-owned.

At its peak, Blackvoices.com was structured with news articles, a messageboard, and blogs. Users had to be a member of AOL to join the site.

In October 2000, General Motors announced a multimillion-dollar three-year deal to advertise on the site.

Some members were upset with the sale of Blackvoices.com from Tribune to AOL and then from AOL to The Huffington Post. Although under AOL the messageboard stayed intact with some changes, The Huffington Post has removed the messageboard.
