= Selective perception =

Type of cognitive bias

Selective perception is the tendency to not notice and more quickly forget stimuli that cause emotional discomfort and contradict prior beliefs. For example, a teacher may have a favorite student because they are biased by in-group favoritism, causing the teacher to ignore the student's poor attainment. Conversely, they might not notice the progress of their least favorite student. It can also occur when consuming mass media, allowing people to see facts and opinions they like while ignoring those that do not fit with particular opinions, values, beliefs, or frame of reference. Psychologists believe this process occurs automatically.

Selective perception has roots in cognitive psychology, where it is studied as a fundamental part of how individuals filter and process information based on biases, expectations, and past experiences. It is closely related to concepts like confirmation bias—favoring information that aligns with one’s beliefs—and cognitive dissonance, the discomfort of holding conflicting thoughts, both of which shape perception. Its applications extend beyond psychology, playing key roles in marketing (shaping consumer focus), politics (influencing voter perception), and mental health (understanding biases in disorders), highlighting its impact on both individual behaviors and societal trends.

== History ==
The concept of selective perception was established in early psychological studies when researchers began to look at how people select and filter information according to pre-existing beliefs, attitudes, and experiences. The area took its basic grounding in Gestalt psychology, noting the dominant role of cognitive frameworks in perceptual processes during the early 20th century. The concept attracted a great deal of scholarly attention in the mid-20th century as researchers studied its implications for decision-making and communication. The work of Leon Festinger provided a major milestone in the field with his statement of the cognitive dissonance theory in 1957, which went a long way toward explaining selective perception. Festinger argued that when people are exposed to information inconsistent with their already held beliefs, they experience discomfort and are motivated to reduce this dissonance through selected interpretation or perception of information that supports their already existing worldview.

Festinger's theory was given empirical support through some brilliant experiments, most notably his study of a UFO doomsday cult, in which participants rationalized their continued beliefs in the face of contrary evidence. This research demonstrated the function of selective perception in reducing cognitive dissonance and thus maintaining consistency in one's beliefs. Around the same time, supporting findings were demonstrated through studies by Hastorf and Cantril in the 1954 Princeton-Dartmouth football game experiment, showing how personal allegiances influenced the perception of the same events. The studies established selective perception as one of the key concepts in understanding human cognition—outlining its strong implications for areas like media use, political decision-making, and interpersonal communication.

== Definition ==
Selective perception may refer to any number of cognitive biases in psychology related to the way expectations affect perception. Human judgment and decision making is distorted by an array of cognitive, perceptual and motivational biases, and people tend not to recognise their own bias, though they tend to easily recognise (and even overestimate) the operation of bias in human judgment by others. One of the reasons this might occur might be because people are simply bombarded with too much stimuli every day to pay equal attention to everything, therefore, they pick and choose according to their own needs.

== Relevant studies ==
To understand when and why a particular region of a scene is selected, studies observed and described the eye movements of individuals as they go about performing specific tasks. In this case, vision was an active process that integrated scene properties with specific, goal-oriented oculomotor behavior.

The following discusses selective perception—the tendency to see what is there in light of one's own departmental interests. Dearborn and Simon had 23 middle-management executives experience a case study regarding the Castengo Steel Company. The executives' reactions showed strong departmental influences: 83% of the Sales executives perceived sales problems, 80% of the Production executives focused on organizational structure, and Accounting executives stressed profitability. Miscellaneous executives stressed human relations problems. These findings suggest that business executives focus on issues relevant to their departments when considering various organizational challenges and, thus, substantiate the influence of departmental roles on the shaping of managerial preoccupation and perception.

In one classic study on this subject related to the hostile media effect (which is itself an example of selective perception), viewers watched a filmstrip of a particularly violent Princeton-Dartmouth American football game. Princeton viewers reported seeing nearly twice as many rule infractions committed by the Dartmouth team than did Dartmouth viewers. One Dartmouth alumnus did not see any infractions committed by the Dartmouth side and erroneously assumed he had been sent only part of the film, sending word requesting the rest.

== Advertising ==
Selective perception is also an issue for advertisers, as consumers may engage with some ads and not others based on their pre-existing beliefs about the brand.

Seymour Smith, a prominent advertising researcher, found evidence for selective perception in advertising research in the early 1960s, and he defined it to be "a procedure by which people let in, or screen out, advertising material they have an opportunity to see or hear. They do so because of their attitudes, beliefs, usage preferences and habits, conditioning, etc." People who like, buy, or are considering buying a brand are more likely to notice advertising than are those who are neutral toward the brand. This fact has repercussions within the field of advertising research because any post-advertising analysis that examines the differences in attitudes or buying behavior among those aware versus those unaware of advertising is flawed unless pre-existing differences are controlled for. Advertising research methods that utilize a longitudinal design are arguably better equipped to control for selective perception.

== Types ==
Selective perceptions are of two types:

- Low level – Perceptual vigilance

Perceptual vigilance refers to the process by which individuals become aware of stimuli in their environment that they find enjoyable or rewarding. People actively seek out information that enhances their experiences, making them more meaningful or memorable. Typically, individuals look for perceptions that align with their needs or desires. However, this heightened awareness can sometimes lead to perceptual distortions, leading individuals to overestimate the prevalence or pervasiveness of these stimuli.

- High level – Perceptual defense

Conversely, people often try to ignore or shift their focus away from stimuli that are irrelevant to their needs or negatively impact them. Sometimes, people may even alter their perception of these stimuli to make them more acceptable. For example, if someone approaches another person, they may have no harmful intent, but the speed at which they are coming toward the other person might prompt their brain to interpret the situation as a threat, triggering an urge to escape. While they are likely to perceive a potential threat in such a scenario, it is improbable that the threat will materialize.

== See also ==
- List of cognitive biases
- Chauvinism – Belief in the superiority of one's own group
- Cognitive dissonance – Mental phenomenon of holding contradictory beliefs
- Confirmation bias – Bias confirming existing attitudes
- Discrimination – Prejudicial treatment based on membership in a certain group
- Drapetomania – Pseudoscientific mental disorder
- Dysaesthesia aethiopica – Alleged mental illness linked to scientific racism
- Placebo – Substance or treatment of no therapeutic value
- Racism – Race or ethnic-based discrimination
- Selective attention – Individual's capacity to choose what they pay attention to and what they ignore
- Selection bias – Bias in a statistical analysis due to non-random selection
- Selective retention – Process where messages close to one's interests are better remembered
- Sexism – Prejudice or discrimination based on a person's sex or gender
- Status quo bias – Cognitive bias
