= MiGente.com =

Former social networking website

- Company type: Social networking service
- Founded: 2000; 26 years ago
- Headquarters: 205 Hudson Street, 6th Floor; New York, USA
- Owner: Urban One

MiGente.com was an online social-networking site specifically targeting the Hispanic community. It was launched in 2000. Its former parent company, Community Connect Inc., claimed that MiGente.com was the fastest growing English language site for the Hispanic community with over 3 million registered members. Members come from a variety of Hispanic backgrounds.

In February 2007, the site partnered with Si TV to launch new channels on the site. The collaboration identified and promoted emerging music artists via Si TV's monthly sweepstakes.

MiGente.com was owned by Community Connect Inc. until April 2008, when the Radio One paid $38 million for New York-based Community Connect, which operated a number of branded Web sites, including BlackPlanet, MiGente and AsianAvenue. Prior to selling of properties, Community Connect claimed about 23 million users. Community Connect Inc. pioneered urban social networks through the creation of brands such as BlackPlanet and MiGente.

MiGente.com visually resembles Facebook and has many similar features, such as friend requests, chat, and tagging. However, a key difference is that MiGente.com allows for more customization of profile pages. Also, unless customized by the user, anything posted on MiGente.com is public and users can comment on any post, without needing to be friends with the poster.

In May 2019, MiGente.com was redirected to BlackPlanet.com, which is also owned by Urban One.

== See also ==
- List of defunct social networking websites
