= Selective retention =

Process where messages close to one's interests are better remembered

Selective retention, in relating to the mind, is the process whereby people more accurately remember messages that are closer to their interests, values and beliefs, than those that are in contrast with their values and beliefs, selecting what to keep in the memory, narrowing the information flow.

Examples include:

- A person may gradually reflect more positively on their time at school as they grow older
- A consumer might remember only the positive health benefits of a product they enjoy
- People who view a company favorably are likely to focus on the positive its times of trouble.
- People tending to omit problems and disputes in past relationships
- A conspiracy theorist paying less attention to facts which do not aid their standpoint

Outside the theory of memory and mind, selective retention may also refer to the retaining of contractual agreements upon moving on in open politics or of physical phenotypes in eugenic methods of propagation of traits and features of a genome, among other fields where action can impose a stratum of creative limitation.

The evolutionary development of selective memory and retention is theorized to stem from the drive to belong. Social drive is considered to be an equivalent to other drives (i.e. hunger) in evolutionary terms. This definition stems from the idea that people only retain socially relevant information and are constantly processing information that will increase the ability to be part of a group. If survival is dependent on the group through information shared between individuals, researchers found that the perception and retention of certain information increases . When in a new situation or surrounded by a desired group of people, there may be a heightened attention to details and the environmental and social cues. Information that is relevant to situations is brought to the surface again through processes like semantic and episodic memory. These processes provide organization to the memories encoded and help the recall of pertinent properties and links. If an individual is in an ambiguous social situation, past stored information can arise through the linking of semantic information, or specific recall of socially relevant actions and aid survival.

Another application on the social advantage in selective memory is with reproduction. Testing female undergraduate students in recall found that in a short video with a male introducing themselves and being considered for a future partner, participants selectively remembered more of what he said than of what he looked like. This is supporting of the notion that the purpose of evolution is to pass on genetic information and that selective retention plays a part in that. Seitz, Polack, and Miller (2018) also found that memory performance increased when stimulated by reproductive cues. In an evolutionary perspective, the organization of the semantic memory may link and connect this type of information more strongly to influence recall and therefore the survival of the individual.

While this process seems to have an evolutionary advantage, evidence suggests that when memories are selectively recalled other information is lost. There can be danger in this because, while the forgotten information may not be pertinent in the current moment, it may be needed later. Researchers also found that during sleep emotional memories have higher retention than non-emotional or neutral memories. But this storage process does not occur only in sleep, but highly stressful situations also induce this selective type of memory consolidation. A benefit of this is that when a moment in time produces an intense emotional reaction, it is saved for better or for worse. But a consequence of emotional memories having priority is that pertinent neutral information may be lost in the aftermath of an emotional event. When thinking of the function of an item rather than the emotional concept of it, recall was higher. The use of an item may provide higher survival skills than just imagining the object and the emotions behind it.

== Factors that influence selective retention ==
- Sleep: There is research supporting the idea that the more sleep a person gets the more likely they are to retain a set of information. Conversely the less sleep a person gets, the less information they are likely to retain.
- Education and schooling: The manner and way in which things are taught significantly influences a student's retention of a specific subject matter or concept. Students who are more engaged (both in the lessons themselves and attendance) tend to have higher retention than students who are not as involved or present in their schooling. There is also an emphasis placed on pictorial learning and visual aids in the classroom to aid students in retention.

== See also ==
- Confirmation bias
- Selective attention
- Selective perception
