= Glee.com =

Internet site for social networking

GLEE
- Type: Social networking company
- Founded: 2007
- Headquarters: 205 Hudson Street, 6th Floor; New York, NY 10013, USA
- Owner: Community Connect, Inc.
- Website: www.glee.com

GLEE.com was a social networking site geared toward the gay, lesbian, bisexual and transgender communities. The site was launched in February 2007 by Community Connect Inc. Community Connect was acquired by Radio One Inc. (now Urban One) in 2008. The site was shut down in 2010–11.

Community Connect operated several niche market social networking sites and GLEE was their latest venture. As with their other social network sites, GLEE was modeled after the popular MySpace and Facebook offering many of the same features.

GLEE.com was available only in the English language and primarily the North American market with approximately 86% of its users in the United States.

== Operations ==
The site was free to users, generating revenues through advertising. Users registered and created profiles, which could include a variety of layout themes for profiles, users also had the option of custom designing a profile layout. Typically, profiles might include uploaded photo albums, music players, lists of interests and friends list. Other features included blog hosting, video hosting, groups, style and news sections, and community bulletin boards covering a variety of issues but with the added emphasis on those issues of importance to the LGBT community. Instant messaging, and email iswasavailable with other registered users.

In addition, profiles are allowed a mirror on GLEE.com's professional networking site, which allows for job search (through an arrangement with Monster.com) along with the other features found on the social network.

== Publicity ==
GLEE.com's launch in early 2007 received generally favorable coverage in internet focused media, with the caveat about competition from established sites and others still on the drawing board divvying up the niche market for potential LGBT users.

In October 2007 GLEE.com received free publicity from an unlikely source, the United States military. The advertising firm that handles the military's recruiting advertising inadvertently placed the ads on the site. The mainstream and LGBT press along with several comedians picked up on the gaffe of advertising to an audience that the U.S. military then actively barred from joining through its Don't ask, don't tell policy.

The Washington Post noted that Barack Obama created a profile on the site during the 2008 US Presidential election campaign.
