= Social influence bias =

Herd behaviours in online social media

The social influence bias is an asymmetric herding effect on online social media platforms that makes users overcompensate for negative ratings but amplify positive ones. Driven by the desire to be accepted within a specific group, it reflects the idea that people alter certain behaviors to fit in with others in that group. Therefore, it is a subgroup term for various types of cognitive biases. Some social influence bias types include the bandwagon effect, authority bias, groupthink effect, social comparison bias, social media bias and more. Understanding these biases helps us understand the term overall.

However, the composition of the term "social influence bias" requires critical examination to understand the way that it affects individuals' and groups' lives. The term "influence" has 2 different types of stigma. For one, it surrounds the idea that people show their true inner selves when "under the influence." On the other end, it also proposes the idea that people are not their own selves when "under the influence." These tend to be constructions made by people, which also tend to fit the situation based on their own perspectives. In social terms, it requires both sides to be examined to understand whether we truly are affected by context, or we continue to behave in terms of our own selves. The term "influence" doesn't necessarily say that there lies greater strength in our inner selves' desires and decisions, nor does it say that external factors have the greater power. In a similar manner, both social and non-social judgments are associated with anxiety, but the same can't necessarily be said in the case of social conformity. The gray areas within this topic raise the question: what does social influence bias say about us, and does it affect us all in the same way?

== Social media bias ==
Media bias is reflected in search systems in social media. In 2018, Kulshrestha and her team found through research that the top-ranked results returned by search engines can influence users' perceptions when they conduct searches for events or people, which is particularly reflected in political bias and polarizing topics. Fueled by confirmation bias, online echo chambers allow users to be steeped in their own ideology. Because social media is tailored to your interests and your selected friends, it is an easy outlet for political echo chambers.

Social media bias is also reflected in the hostile media effect. Social media has a place in disseminating news in modern society, where viewers are exposed to other people's comments while reading news articles. In their 2020 study, Gearhart and her team showed that viewers' perceptions of bias increased and perceptions of credibility decreased after seeing comments with which they held different opinions.

== In research context ==
In observational data, how social influence affects collected judgment is challenging to fully understand. Positive social influence can accumulate and result in a rating bubble, while negative social influence is neutralized by crowd correction. This phenomenon was first described in a paper written by Lev Muchnik, Sinan Aral and Sean J. Taylor in 2014, and then the question was revisited by Cicognani et al., whose experiment reinforced Muchnik's and his co-authors' results.

== Relevance ==
Online customer reviews are trusted sources of information in various contexts such as online marketplaces, dining, accommodation, movies, or digital products. However, these online ratings are not immune to herd behavior, which means that subsequent reviews are not independent of each other. As on other sites, preceding opinions are visible to a new reviewer; they can be heavily influenced by the antecedent evaluations in their decision about a certain product, service, or online content. This form of herding behavior inspired Muchnik, Aral and Taylor to conduct their experiment on influence in social contexts.

== Experimental design ==
Muchnik, Aral, and Taylor designed a large-scale randomized experiment to measure social influence on user reviews. The experiment was conducted on social news aggregation websites like Reddit. The study lasted for 5 months; the authors randomly assigned 101, 281 comments to one of the following treatment groups: up-treated (4049), down-treated (1942), or control (the proportions reflect the observed ratio of up-and down-votes. Comments that identify with the first group were given an upvote upon the creation of the comment; the second group has a downvote upon creation; the comments in the control group remain untouched. A vote is equivalent to a single rating (+1 or -1). As other users are unable to trace a user's votes, they were unaware of the experiment. Due to randomization, comments in the control and the treatment group were not different in terms of expected rating. The treated comments were viewed more than 10 million times and rated 308, 515 times by successive users.

== Results ==
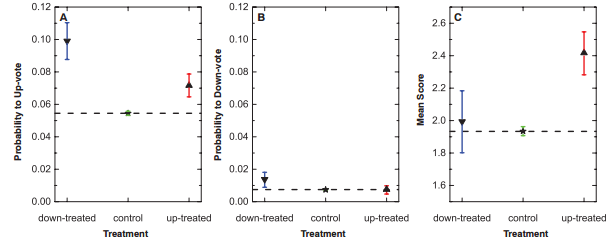
Effect of manipulation on voting behaviour. A: probabilities to up-vote. B: probabilities to down-vote. C: Mean final scores (number of up-votes minus number of down-votes) of the manipulated and control group comments inferred from Bayesian linear regression, 95% confidence intervals shown.

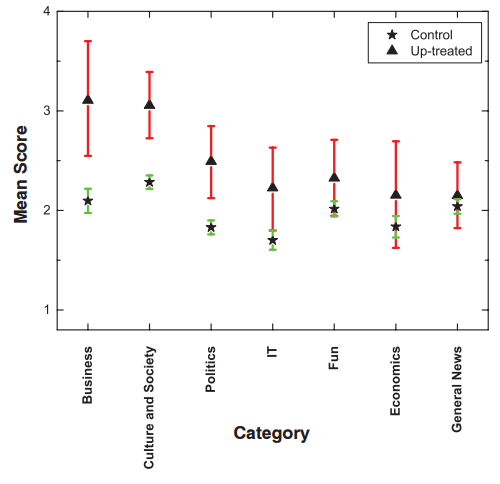
Mean final scores of positively manipulated and control group comments as the results of Bayesian linear regression (95% confidence interval shown).

The up-vote treatment increased the probability of up-voting by the first viewer by 32% over the control group, while the probability of down-voting did not change compared to the control group, which means that users did not correct the random positive rating. The upward bias remained in place for the observed 5-month period. The accumulating herding effect increased the comments' mean rating by 25% compared to the control group comments. Positively manipulated comments did receive higher ratings at all parts of the distribution, which means that they were also more likely to collect extremely high scores.

The negative manipulation created an asymmetric herd effect; although the probability of subsequent down-votes was increased by the negative treatment, the probability of up-voting also grew for these comments. The community performed a correction which neutralized the negative treatment and resulted in non-different final mean ratings from the control group. The authors also compared the final mean scores of comments across the most active topic categories on the website. The observed positive herding effect was present in the "politics," "culture and society," and "business" subreddits, but was not applicable for "economics," "IT," "fun," and "general news".-

== Implications ==
The skewed nature of online ratings makes review outcomes different from what they would've been without the social influence bias. A 2009 experiment by Hu, Zhang, and Pavlou showed that the distribution of reviews of a certain product made by unconnected individuals is approximately normal; however, the rating of the same product on Amazon followed a J-shaped distribution with twice as many five-star ratings as others. Cicognani, Figini, and Magnani came to similar conclusions after their experiment conducted on a tourism services website: positive preceding ratings influenced raters' behavior more than mediocre reviews. Positive crowd correction makes community-based opinions upward-biased.

== See also ==
- Algorithmic curation
- Algorithmic radicalization
- Asymmetric follow
- Bandwagon effect
- Biased random walk on a graph
- Ghost followers
- Influence-for-hire
- Pseudo-opinion
- Response bias
- Social bot
- Social-desirability bias
- Social media bias
- Social spam
- Sockpuppet (Internet)
- Twitter bot
  - Twitter bomb
