= Asymmetric follow =

Social network design aspect

An asymmetric follow social network is one which allows many people to follow an individual or account without having to follow them back. It is also known as asynchronous follow or sometimes asymmetric friendship.

Asymmetric follow is a common pattern on Twitter, where someone may have thousands of followers, but themselves follow few (or no) accounts. In September 2010 Facebook started experimenting with a similar feature, which Facebook calls "Subscribe To."

== See also ==
- Algorithmic curation
- Algorithmic radicalization
- Friending and following
- Influence-for-hire
- Ghost followers
- Social bot
- Social influence bias
- Social media bias
