= Rantic =

Social media marketing website

Rantic Marketing
- Website type: Social media marketing
- Available in: English
- Owners: Simon Z (CEO) "Jacob" "Juice" "Jerry" "Alexander" "Kamaruzaman"
- Revenue: Unknown
- Website: www.rantic.com
- Registration: No
- Launched: 2012
- Current status: Up

Rantic.com (formerly SocialVEVO and Swenzy) is a social media marketing website that sells fake likes, followers, views and web traffic.

== Background ==
Rantic.com was registered in 2014 by a group of internet marketers. The group also has used the names SocialVEVO and Swenzy. During an interview with Vocativ, one of five people claiming to be founders said the online business was created by "Jacob, Jerry, Juice, Alexander and Kamaruzaman". The CEO is listed as Simon Z and consumers are said to include musicians, teens, celebrities, politicians and governments, according to a New York Times and Forbes report. The website sells "fake account" services for social networking sites such as Twitter, Instagram, YouTube and Facebook, a potential violation of these sites' terms of service.

In 2014, an online threat to release nude photos of actor Emma Watson turned out to be a hoax orchestrated by Rantic. Following Watson's launch of a UN gender equality campaign, a website emerged claiming photos of the actor would be released via 4chan. When the countdown ended the site redirected users to Rantic.com where a message claimed the group aimed to shut down 4chan.

In April 2015, a Facebook engineer said the site's effort to crack down on the "small problem", coupled with an effort to help pages gain authentic followers instead, had shut down most of the fake "like" sellers. Rantic called itself one of fewer than a dozen such companies remaining, and has promised to refill any "likes" or followers lost to account sweeps by the operators of sites including Facebook and Instagram.

== See also ==
- Devumi
- Ghost followers
- Influence-for-hire
- Social media marketing
- Viral marketing
