= Algorithmic radicalization =

Radicalization via social media algorithms

Algorithmic radicalization is the concept that recommender algorithms on popular social media sites, such as YouTube and Facebook, drive users toward progressively more extreme content over time, leading to the development of radicalized extremist political views. Algorithms track user interactions, such as likes, dislikes, and watch time, to generate a continuous stream of content intended to maximize engagement. Echo chamber channels have been described as contributing to increased polarization largely through reinforcing media preferences and validating existing beliefs, though this effect is often discussed in general commentary rather than established through rigorous empirical research.

Algorithmic radicalization remains a controversial phenomenon as it is often not in the best interest of social media companies to remove echo chamber channels. To what extent recommender algorithms are actually responsible for radicalization remains disputed. Studies have found contradictory results regarding the promotion of extremist content by algorithms.

== Social media echo chambers and filter bubbles ==
Social media platforms learn the interests and likes of the user to modify their experiences in their feed to keep them engaged and scrolling, known as a filter bubble. An echo chamber is an environment in which like-minded users encounter information that reinforces their existing beliefs while limiting exposure to opposing views, potentially contributing to confirmation bias. According to group polarization theory, an echo chamber can potentially lead users and groups towards more extreme radicalized positions. According to the National Library of Medicine, "Users online tend to prefer information adhering to their worldviews, ignore dissenting information, and form polarized groups around shared narratives. Furthermore, when polarization is high, misinformation quickly proliferates."

== By site ==
=== Facebook ===
Facebook's algorithm focuses on recommending content that makes the user want to interact. They rank content by prioritizing popular posts by friends, viral content, and sometimes divisive content. Each feed is personalized to the user's specific interests which can sometimes lead users towards an echo chamber of troublesome content. Users can find their list of interests the algorithm uses by going to the "Your ad Preferences" page. According to a Pew Research study, 74% of Facebook users did not know that list existed until they were directed towards that page in the study. It is also relatively common for Facebook to assign political labels to their users. In recent years, Facebook has started using artificial intelligence to change the content users see in their feed and what is recommended to them. A document known as The Facebook Files has revealed that their AI system prioritizes user engagement over everything else. The Facebook Files has also demonstrated that controlling the AI systems has proven difficult to handle.

Facebook admitted that "the mechanics of our platforms are not neutral" in an August 2019 internal memo. concluding that in order to reach maximum profits, optimization for engagement is necessary. In order to increase engagement, algorithms have found that hate, misinformation, and politics are instrumental for app activity. As the article notes, "The more incendiary the material, the more it keeps users engaged, the more it is boosted by the algorithm." According to a 2018 study, "false rumors spread faster and wider than true information... They found falsehoods are 70% more likely to be retweeted on Twitter than the truth, and reach their first 1,500 people six times faster. This effect is more pronounced with political news than other categories."

=== YouTube ===
YouTube has been around since 2005 and has more than 2.5 billion monthly users. YouTube discovery content systems focus on the user's personal activity (watched, favorites, likes) to direct them to recommended content. YouTube's algorithm is accountable for roughly 70% of users' recommended videos and what drives people to watch certain content. According to a 2022 study by the Mozilla Foundation, users have little power to keep unsolicited videos out of their suggested recommended content. This includes videos about hate speech, livestreams, etc.

YouTube has been identified as an influential platform for spreading radicalized content. Al-Qaeda and similar extremist groups have been linked to using YouTube for recruitment videos and engaging with international media outlets. In a research study published by the American Behavioral Scientist Journal, they researched "whether it is possible to identify a set of attributes that may help explain part of the YouTube algorithm's decision-making process". The results of the study showed that YouTube's algorithm recommendations for extremism content factor into the presence of radical keywords in a video's title. In February 2023, in the case of Gonzalez v. Google, the question at hand is whether or not Google, the parent company of YouTube, is protected from lawsuits claiming that the site's algorithms aided terrorists in recommending ISIS videos to users. Section 230 is known to generally protect online platforms from civil liability for the content posted by its users.

Multiple studies have found little to no evidence to suggest that YouTube's algorithms direct attention towards far-right content to those not already engaged with it.

=== TikTok ===
TikTok is a platform that recommends videos to a user's 'For You Page' (FYP), making every users' page different. With the nature of the algorithm behind the app, TikTok's FYP has been linked to showing more explicit and radical videos over time based on users' previous interactions on the app. Since TikTok's inception, the app has been scrutinized for misinformation and hate speech as those forms of media usually generate more interactions to the algorithm.

As of 2022, TikTok's head of US Security has put out a statement that "81,518,334 videos were removed globally between April – June for violating our Community Guidelines or Terms of Service" to cut back on hate speech, harassment, and misinformation.

According to a Soufan Center report, studies have noted instances where individuals were radicalized through content encountered on TikTok. For example, in early 2023, Austrian authorities thwarted a plot against an LGBTQ+ pride parade that involved two teenagers and a 20-year-old who were inspired by jihadist content on TikTok. The youngest suspect, 14 years old, had been exposed to videos created by Islamist influencers glorifying jihad. These videos led him to further engagement with similar content, eventually resulting in his involvement in planning an attack.

Another case involved the arrest of several teenagers in Vienna, Austria, in 2024, who were planning to carry out a terrorist attack at a Taylor Swift concert. The investigation revealed that some of the suspects had been radicalized online, with TikTok being one of the platforms used to disseminate extremist content that influenced their beliefs and actions.

== Self-radicalization ==
An infographic from the United States Department of Homeland Security's "If You See Something, Say Something" campaign. The campaign is a national initiative to raise awareness to homegrown terrorism and terrorism-related crime.

The U.S. Department of Justice defines 'Lone-wolf' (self) terrorism as "someone who acts alone in a terrorist attack without the help or encouragement of a government or a terrorist organization". Through social media outlets on the internet, 'Lone-wolf' terrorism has been on the rise, being linked to algorithmic radicalization. Through echo-chambers on the internet, viewpoints typically seen as radical were accepted and quickly adopted by other extremists. These viewpoints are encouraged by forums, group chats, and social media to reinforce their beliefs.

== References in media ==
=== The Social Dilemma ===
The Social Dilemma is a 2020 docudrama about how social media algorithms enable addiction and manipulate people's views, emotions, and behavior to spread conspiracy theories and disinformation. The film repeatedly uses terms such as 'echo chambers' and 'fake news' to illustrate psychological manipulation on social media and its potential to lead to political manipulation. In the film, Ben falls deeper into a social media addiction as the algorithm determines that his social media page has a 62.3% chance of long-term engagement and recommends more videos for him. Ben eventually becomes more immersed into propaganda and conspiracy theories, becoming more polarized with each video.

== Proposed solutions ==
=== United States: Weakening Section 230 protections ===
In the Communications Decency Act, Section 230 states that "No provider or user of an interactive computer service shall be treated as the publisher or speaker of any information provided by another information content provider". Section 230 protects the media from liabilities or being sued of third-party content, such as illegal activity from a user. Michael D. Smith and Marshall W. Van Alstyne argued that Section 230's broad liability protections reduce social media platforms' incentives to proactively remove harmful content. This claim has itself been criticized by proponents of Section 230, as prior to its passing, courts had ruled in Stratton Oakmont, Inc. v. Prodigy Services Co. that moderation in any capacity introduces a liability to content providers as "publishers" of the content they chose to leave up.

Lawmakers have drafted legislation that would weaken or remove Section 230 protections over algorithmic content. House Democrats Anna Eshoo, Frank Pallone Jr., Mike Doyle, and Jan Schakowsky introduced the "Justice Against Malicious Algorithms Act" in October 2021 as H.R. 5596. The bill died in committee, but it would have removed Section 230 protections for service providers related to personalized recommendation algorithms that present content to users if those algorithms knowingly or recklessly deliver content that contributes to physical or severe emotional injury.

== See also ==
- Algorithmic curation
- Alt-right pipeline
- Ambient awareness
- Complex contagion
- Computational propaganda
- Dead Internet theory
- Disinformation attack
- Doomscrolling
- Echo chamber
- Enshittification
- Extremism
- False consensus effect
- Far-right usage of social media
- Filter bubble
- Influence-for-hire
- Misinformation effect
- Online youth radicalization
- Radical trust
- Selective exposure theory
- Social bot
- Social data revolution
- Social influence bias
- Social media bias
- Vicarious trauma after viewing media
- Virtual collective consciousness
- Schizoposting
