= Devumi =

Former social media company

Devumi was an American company founded in 2010 which sold fake influence on social media. In October 2019, Devumi settled with the Federal Trade Commission, in the agency's first-ever complaint regarding the sale of fake followers, views, and likes on social media, for $2.5 million.

== Overview ==
While Devumi operated, it sold more than 200 million fake followers. Even at its peak the company was tiny with their main office located above a restaurant in Florida. The firm primarily sold Twitter bots sourced from operations like Peakerr, SkillPatron, JAP, Cheap Panel and YTbot at a markup to celebrity and commercial clients. The company also operated on YouTube, SoundCloud, and LinkedIn.

== History ==
In 2018, The New York Times published an expose about Devumi and its role in social media fraud, including supplying fake video views and social media account followers to customers. The revelations in the story spurred action from regulators. Devumi was forced to shut down soon after the article was published.

In 2019, owner and CEO German Calas, Jr settled with the Federal Trade Commission (FTC) for $2.5 million. According to the FTC this was the "first-ever complaint challenging the sale of fake indicators of social media influence."

== See also ==
- Ghost followers
- Influence-for-hire
