= Social media use in politics =

Social media use in politics refers to the use of online social media platforms in political processes and activities, including all activities that pertain to the governance of a country or area like political organization, global politics, political corruption, political parties, and political values. The media's primary duty is to present us with information and alert us when events occur. This information may affect what we think and the actions we take. The media can also place pressure on the government to act by signaling a need for intervention or showing that citizens want change.

The Internet has created communication channels that play a key role in circulating news, and social media has the power to change not just the message, but also the dynamics of political corruption, values, and conflict. Use of social media in elections, global conflict, made diplomacy less secretive and more susceptible to public perception. Social media has gained a large share of all information dissemination channels. Though often riddled with bias, Twitter, its successor X and Facebook have the potential to alter civic engagement. Social media sources also affect elections and campaigns, as influencers and trolls spread political views, voting recommendations and fake news. For example, it was reported that Russia had managed to infiltrate American social media sources during the 2016 presidential election and flooded them with fake news. Further studies have found that in the months leading up to the election, fake articles favouring Trump were shared 30 million times, in comparison to Clinton's only 8 million.

== Background ==
=== Participatory role ===
Social media are allowing anyone with an Internet connection to become a content creator and empowering their users. The idea of "new media populism" encompasses how citizens can include disenfranchised citizens, and allow the public to play an engaged and active role in political discourse. New media can enhance people's access to political information.

Social media platforms and the internet have facilitated the dissemination of political information that counters mainstream media tactics that are often centralized and top-down, including high entry barriers. Writer Howard Rheingold characterized the community created on social networking sites: "The political significance of computer-mediated communication lies in its capacity to challenge the existing political hierarchy's monopoly on powerful communications media, and perhaps thus revitalize citizen-based democracy." Scholar Derrick de Kerckhove described the new technology in media:"In a networked society, the real powershift is from the producer to the consumer, and there is a redistribution of controls and power. On the Web, Karl Marx's dream has been realized: the tools and the means of production are in the hands of the workers."

The role of social media in democratizing media participation, which proponents herald as ushering in a new era of participatory democracy, with all users able to contribute news and comments, may fall short of the ideals. International survey data suggest online media audience members are largely passive consumers, while content creation is dominated by a small number of social users who post comments and write new content. Others argue that the effect of social media will vary from one country to another, with domestic political structures playing a greater role than social media in determining how citizens express opinions about stories of current affairs involving the state.

Most people see social media platforms as censoring objectionable political views.

In June 2020, TikTok users organized a movement to prank a Trump Rally in Tulsa, Oklahoma, by buying tickets and not attending so that the rally appeared empty. In early 2025, the U.S. government banned TikTok on federal devices, citing national security concerns over data access by the Chinese government. This sparked debate over free speech and the role of foreign platforms in domestic political communication, especially as TikTok had become a major political tool for Gen Z activists, and activists overall.

==== Polarization (Affective Polarization) ====
Recent analysis of digital discourse is shifting focus from informational polarization to effective polarization. This describes a state where citizens do not just disagree with the opposing party but actively dislike and distrust people associated with it. Social media platforms contribute to this by prioritizing media mocking or criticizing the opposing side. This media output receives significantly higher engagement overall than content promoting one's own platform or ideas. Through 2025, empirical data suggests that a shared reality among voters is less disrupted by a lack of information and more by the emotional framing of that information. This emotional feedback loop creates hostility within digital environments. Which inherently discourages moderate discourse and rewards what in some cases is radicalism. Effective polarization on social media has linked to a decline in social trust and an increased belief that the other side poses as a threat to the nation. Now that media is shifting away from policy-based debate, and towards radicalized media algorithms, this is altering the emotional temperament of political actors, making partisan compromise increasingly difficult.

=== As a news source ===
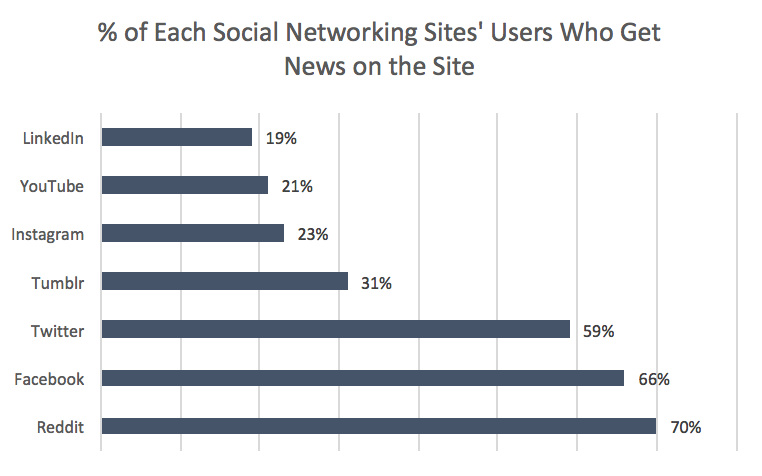

Social media platforms are increasingly used for political news and information by adults in the United States, especially regarding election time. A study by Pew Research conducted in November 2019 found that one in five US adults get their political news primarily through social media. 18% of adults use social media to get political and election news, 48% of them are from ages 18–29. In small research conducted by McKeever et al. in 2022, they found that 269 out of the 510 United States participants had noted that they got most of their information about gun violence from social media sources.

In addition, Reddit, Twitter, and Facebook are the social media platforms that most users use to acquire news information. Two-thirds of Facebook users (66%) access news on the platform; 59% of Twitter users access news on the platform, and 70% of Reddit users access news on the platform.

According to the Reuters Institute Digital News Report in 2013, the percentage of online news users who blog about news issues ranges from 1–5%. Greater percentages use social media to comment on news, with participation ranging from 8% in Germany to 38% in Brazil. But online news users are most likely to just talk about online news with friends offline or use social media to share stories without creating content.

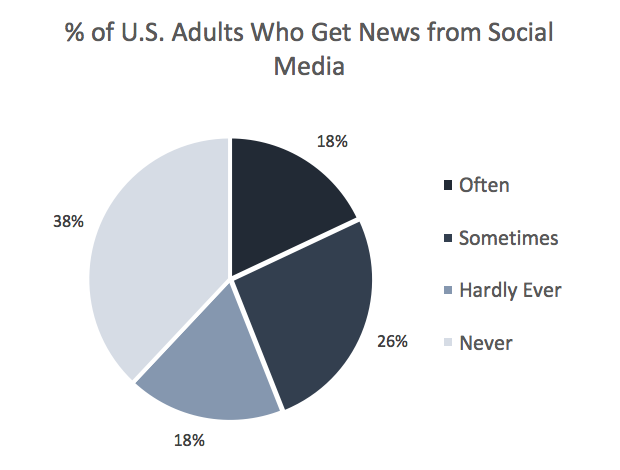

The rapid propagation of information on social media, spread by word of mouth, can quickly impact the perception and thus reputation of political figures and campaigns in negative ways. For example, the use Twitter by United States congressman Anthony Weiner to send inappropriate messages played a role in his resignation.

==== Role of political influencers ====
By 2026, the landscape of digital news has shifted towards influencers self-marketing themselves as political actors/figures. This use was particularly adopted by Generation Z. Although traditional platforms such as Facebook or X remain foundational for many, independent creators are gaining mass following and support worldwide. They exercise high levels of influence on personal decision making based on perceived branding rather than institutional credentials. Unlike in traditional news outlets, influencers commonly blend their political beliefs with their personal branding. Often the information covered has significant variability.

=== Attention economy ===
Social media, especially news spread through social media sites, plays into the idea of the attention economy. Content that attracts more attention will be seen, shared, and disseminated far more than news content that does not gather as much traction from the public. Tim Wu from Columbia Law School coins the attention economy as "the resale of human attention."

A communication platform such as social media is persuasive and often works to change or influence opinions regarding political views because of the abundance of ideas, thoughts, and opinions circulating through the social media platform. It is found that news use leads to political persuasion, therefore the more that people use social media platforms for news sources, the more their political opinions will be affected. Despite that, people are expressing less trust in their government and others due to media use- therefore, social media directly affects trust in media use. It is proven that while reading newspapers, there is an increase in social trust, on the contrary, watching the news on television weakens trust in others and news sources. Social media, or more specifically news media- plays an important role in democratic societies because they allow for participation among citizens. Therefore, when it comes to healthy democratic networks, that news must remain true so it does not affect citizens' levels of trust. A certain amount of trust is necessary for a healthy functioning democratic system.

Younger generations are becoming more involved in politics due to the increased political news posted on various types of social media. Due to the heavier use of social media among younger generations, they are exposed to politics more frequently, and in a way that is integrated into their online social lives. While informing younger generations of political news is important, there are many biases within the realms of social media. In May 2016, former Facebook Trending News curator Benjamin Fearnow revealed his job was to "massage the algorithm," but dismissed any "intentional, outright bias" by either human or automated efforts within the company. Fearnow was fired by Facebook after being caught leaking several internal company debates about Black Lives Matter and presidential candidate Donald Trump.

=== As a public utility ===
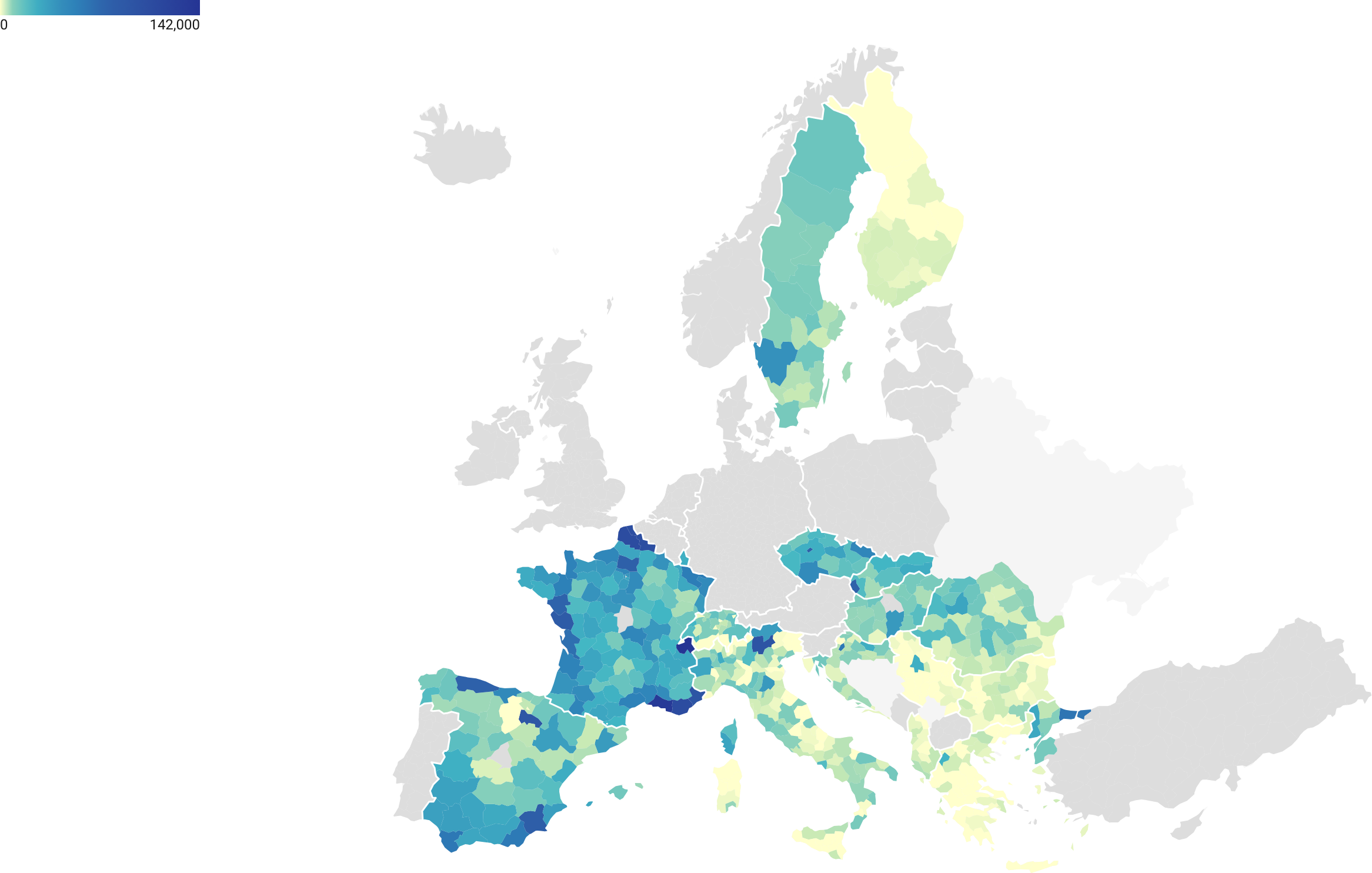
Map of NUTS 3 regions by administration's Facebook follower count

Social media platforms like X (formerly Twitter), Facebook, and Instagram enable candidates and influencers to reach millions of people instantaneously and rally support. A key debate centers on whether or not social media is a public good based on the premises of non-rival and non-excludable consumption. Social media can be considered an impure public good as it can be excludable given the rights of platforms such as Facebook and Twitter to remove content, deactivate accounts, and filter information based on algorithms and community standards.

"For new media to be potential equalizers, they must be treated as public utilities, recognizing that spectrum abundance (the excuse for privatization) does not prevent monopoly ownership of hardware and software platforms and hence cannot guarantee equal civic, educational, and cultural access to citizens." Similarly, Zeynep Tufekci argues online services are natural monopolies that underwrite the "corporatization of social commons" and the "privatization of our publics."

One argument that displays the nature of social media as impure public good is that the control over content remains in the hands of a few large media networks, such as Google and Facebook. Google and Facebook have the power to shape the environment under personal and commercial goals that promote profitability, as opposed to promoting citizen voice and public deliberation.

The algorithm used by TikTok is well known for favoring interesting content that is likely to elicit interactions like likes, shares, and comments. Politically sensitive videos can therefore become viral and reach millions of people in a matter of hours. TikTok users came together in large numbers to produce and distribute videos endorsing their favorite candidates during the 2020 U.S. presidential election, bringing attention to important problems such as healthcare, climate change, and racial justice (Herrman, 2020). TikTok has also been used to spread awareness of global concerns, such as the protests in Hong Kong and the Israeli-Palestinian conflict. Younger generations, who make up the majority of the platform's user base, may find political action more approachable thanks to the ability to effectively combine visual narrative with political messaging.

==== Government regulation ====
Advocacy for regulation of social media is growing due to concerns surrounding monopolies of social media platforms as well as issues of privacy, censorship, network neutrality, and information storage. The discussion of regulation is a convoluted one due to the way Google simultaneously functions as a service, information pipeline, and content provider. This complication raises the question of how the government would regulate the platform as both a service and information provider. Therefore, many proponents advocate for "algorithmic neutrality," where search engines on social media platforms would have the ability to rank data without human intervention.

Opponents of social media regulation argue that platforms such as Facebook and Twitter do not resemble traditional public utilities, and regulation would harm consumer welfare as public utility regulation can hinder innovation and freedom of expression. Additionally, the frequent infringement of the First Amendment necessitates some level of control from media providers.

Social media programmes are required to combat misinformation and detect AI generated content. However, 13% of countries holding federal elections have had their democratic processes targeted by hacktivists, cyber criminals, or political actors with the intent to manipulate information, sway public opinion or even destabilise democratic institutions. Social media tools such as mass communication, mobilisation, and public opinion formation are necessary to inform voters during election time. While calling for the state to enforce more regulation over AI generated content may help to reduce the spread of misinformation, the stricter control of the state over political content could potentially be used to dampen democratic discussion. Ultimately, fostering a democratic digital ecosystem involves balancing technological innovation with ethical governance to ensure fair electoral processes.

The proliferation of social media has created a platform for communication between government institutions and citizens. By providing a large number of people with the ability to gather information and express their views, social media can be a tool for governments to engage with the public and foster dialogue. This can enable governments to understand and address their citizens' needs and provide more transparent and accountable governance. Gathering public sentiment on government initiatives is a part of the policy-making process. The media's role can be to present information and alert people to important events. This information may affect what people think and the actions they take. The media can also pressure the government to act by signaling a need for intervention or showing that citizens can change.

== Social media and international relations ==
In his 2014 article "The Theory of the Globe Scrambled by Social Networks: A New Sphere of Influence 2.0," Tiziano Peccia argues that certain dynamics of the Cold War persist in the digital age, particularly through social networks. He notes that while Western countries predominantly use American platforms like Facebook and Twitter, Eastern nations often prefer local alternatives such as Sina Weibo and V Kontakte, creating distinct ideological and cultural spheres online. Peccia discusses how social networks facilitate both connection and division, breaking down geographical and generational barriers but also reinforcing ideological divides. He highlights examples like the Afghan Defence Ministry using Twitter for international communication, and contrasts the Western embrace of global social media with the controlled, government-approved networks in countries like Iran and China. Peccia concludes that while social networks are powerful tools for communication and political mobilization, they also reflect and reinforce the geopolitical tensions reminiscent of the Cold War era.

Another paper by Peccia and Meda (2016) explores how social media both disseminates information and creates tensions between states. The study focuses on Russia, China, and Iran, nations that have developed their own social media platforms to meet local demands while avoiding Western influences. These platforms also aim to extend their reach to neighboring countries. The authors argue that social media plays a dual role: fostering communication and community-building while simultaneously reinforcing ideological divisions and geostrategic conflicts.

The paper discusses how social media can enhance transparency and accountability but also act as a "society without a body," offering limited physical community ties. The impact of social media varies globally due to cultural, political, and literacy factors, with significant censorship in countries like China, Iran, and Russia, which restricts freedom of expression and information.

The authors note that while social media has democratizing potential, it also poses challenges to authoritarian regimes, which seek to control online narratives. In contrast, Western countries, particularly the United States, use social media to spread their influence. This digital Cold War exacerbates ideological and geopolitical divisions, highlighting the need for international efforts to promote net neutrality and educate users on the responsible use of social media.

In conclusion, the paper calls for a balanced approach that respects diverse political systems while advocating for freedom of expression and the responsible use of social media to bridge ideological divides and promote global understanding.

== Effect on democracy ==
Social media has been criticized as being detrimental to democracy. According to Ronald Deibert, "The world of social media is more conducive to extreme, emotionally charged, and divisive types of content than it is to calm, principled considerations of competing or complex narratives". On the contrary, Ethan Zuckerman says that social media presents the opportunity to inform more people, amplify voices, and allow for an array of diverse voices to speak. Mari K. Eder points to failures of the Fourth Estate that have allowed outrage to be disguised as news, contributing to citizen apathy when confronting falsehoods and further distrust in democratic institutions. However, the growth of social media has allowed a growth of political participation to a whole new audience within society. This can be seen as a "kick starter of a deeper transformation of democratic practices and opportunities" suggesting that digital media can have huge influences and changes within politics but the question still remains if young people will remain politically active within the near future. The free flow of information on the internet and social media can have large contributions to open debate and an exchange of ideas, two crucial tenants of democracy. There are other ways social media in the use of politics can have an effect on democracy such as election influence and privacy concerns with data. The use of social media platforms have had crucial effects for election campaigns where politicians are competing for peoples attention, discuss what they are doing, and specific advertising. With data social media collects many amounts of data coming from individuals which can be used for political data where people can see specific advertisements. According to a recent Pew Research Center, a study conducted across 19 advanced nations found that the public views social media's role in democracy as both beneficial and detrimental. In general, most people think it has improved democracy; 35% think it has hurt it, and 57% think it has helped. With only 34% of adults in the US believing social media has benefited democracy and 64% believing it has had the opposite impact, the US stands out as an anomaly. This opinion is consistent with broader views that social media is dividing society.

Social media invokes participation and develops involvement among all citizens. Social media is a form of communication with people near and far. Although in some cases it leads to false accusations, it has led people to become more engaged and encouraged to inform themselves.

=== Politicians and social media ===
Social media has transformed how politicians communicate, allowing them to bypass traditional news outlets and engage directly with the public. This shift has enabled more immediate, unfiltered messaging, and has altered the dynamics of political campaigning, public relations, and policy making. One of the most prominent examples is Donald Trump, whose use of Twitter played an important role in shaping media narratives and mobilizing his popularity during his 2016 election campaign. His frequent, and often controversial tweets received a lot of wide spread media coverage and allowed him to dominate the news cycle without relying on traditional media.

Another example is Kamala Harris, who, during the 2024 election period, used social media outlets such as X and TikTok to reach young voters through her campaign's main account using social media trends and memes. On July 21st, the campaign's main social media account went from Biden HQ to Kamala HQ after she was endorsed by Biden, ending his re-election campaign. From there, the accounts' following on TikTok doubled overnight.

A study conducted by Sounman Hong found that politicians decisions to adopt and actively use social media platforms often depend on their political positioning and strategic needs. Specially, the research shows that political underdogs, members of opposing parties, are more likely to use social media extensively. For these groups, platforms like Twitter and Facebook offer a way to gain visibility, build a following, and influence public discourse despite limited access to mainstream media.

Additionally, the use of social media in politics has expanded on a global scale. Politicians in countries such as Brazil or India, have similarly embraced platforms to rally supporters and challenge dominant narratives. While social media can enhance political engagement and transparency, scholars and observers have also raised concerns about misinformation, polarization, and journalistic standards. These platforms often prioritise promoting shocking or dramatic content, instead of thoughtful discussions, which can lead to confusion and unhealthy political debates.

=== Democratization ===
==== The Arab Spring ====
During the peak of the Egyptian Revolution of 2011, the Internet and social media played a huge role in facilitating information. At that time, Hosni Mubarak was the president of Egypt and head the regime for almost 30 years. Mubarak was so threatened by the immense power that the Internet and social media gave the people that the government successfully shut down the Internet, using the Ramses Exchange, for a period of time in February 2011.

Egyptians used Facebook, Twitter, and YouTube as a means to communicate and organize demonstrations and rallies to overthrow President Hosni Mubarak. Statistics show that during this time the rate of Tweets from Egypt increased from 2,300 to 230,000 per day and the top 23 protest videos had approximately 5.5 million views. The Supreme Council of the Armed Forces, the military coup that deposed President Mubarak, set up a Facebook page quickly after gaining power. Through this, the new regime sought control over the dissemination of information, with the Facebook page being the exclusive outlet for information

==== Use in autocracies ====
Social Media in autocracies enables both freedom for protestors and control for ruling regimes. On the one hand, social media represents a freedom of information that could previously be gatekept by ruling governments through their control over traditional media. This makes it harder for dictators to hide atrocities from the people, as anyone with a camera phone is capable of exposing acts of terror with ease. Gruesome images of bodies which would have previously been kept out of newspapers can now be plastered all over social media, inspiring people to act.

Social media platforms can also give governments an unprecedented amount of information over the population. This can be used to track certain individuals, such as political opponents, and censor dissent.

===== Equalization vs. Normalization in Digital Space =====
The democratization of political communication is governed through a framework of equalization versus normalization. This framework dives beyond individual participation, while equalization suggests that social media lowers barriers for niche parties, normalization suggests that rich, established parties simply carry over their dominance online. Recent studies indicate these dynamics are shaped by preexisting "party system logic," where unestablished parties utilize a centrifugal logic, interacting aggressively to pull more voters. Established "catch all" parties use a centripetal logic, since social media provides tools for radical mobilization or traditional information spreading on top of preexisting support.

=== Disinformation in relation to US election ===
Disinformation is false news spread intentionally. Though fake news can generate some utility for consumers, in terms of confirming far-right beliefs and spreading propaganda in favor of a presidential candidate, it also imposes private and social costs. For example, one social cost to consumer is the spread of disinformation which can make it harder for consumers to seek out the truth and, in the case of the 2016 Election, for consumers to choose an electoral candidate. Summarized by a Congressional Research Service Study in 2017,

"Cyber tools were also used [by Russia] to create psychological effects in the American population. The likely collateral effects of these activities include compromising the fidelity of information, sowing discord and doubt in the American public about the validity of intelligence community reports, and prompting questions about the democratic process itself."

The marginal social cost of fake news is exponential, as the first article is shared it can affect a small number of people, but as the article is circulated more throughout Facebook, the negative externality multiplies. As a result, the quantity demanded of news can shift up around election season as consumers seek to find correct news, however the quantity demanded can also shift down as people have a lower trust in mainstream media. In the American public, a Gallup poll in 2016 found "Americans' trust in the mass media 'to report the news fully, accurately and fairly' was, at 32%, the lowest in the organization's polling history." In addition, trust in mainstream media is lower in Republican and far-right political viewers at 14%. About 72% of American adults claim that social media firms excessively control and influence the politics today, as per the June 16–22 survey conducted by Pew Research Center. Only 21% believe that the power held by these social media firms over today's politics is of the right amount, while 6% believe it is not enough.

Facebook founder and META CEO, Mark Zuckerberg spoke in 2024 on the Biden administration and how they "pressured" the company to censor COVID-19 related posts in 2021. Zuckerberg would go on to explain that the initiative would remove posts that made light of the pandemic. Zuckerberg said "some people believed this work benefited one party over the other." Zuckerberg said he would not be "making a similar contribution this cycle."

Algorithms can facilitate the rapid spread of disinformation through social media channels. Algorithms use users' past behavior and engagement activity to provide them with tailored content that aligns with their interests and beliefs. Algorithms commonly create echo chambers and sow radicalism and extremist thinking in these online spaces.

Algorithms promote social media posts with high "engagement", meaning posts that received a lot of "likes" or "comments"/"replies". For better or for worse, engagement and controversy go hand-in-hand. Controversy attracts attention as it evokes an emotional response, however Benford's Law of controversy states that "passion is inversely proportional to the amount of real information available". This means that the less grounded in facts a political tweet is, the more engagement it is likely to receive, therefore the likelihood of spreading disinformation is high. Twitter has become a battleground for political debate. Psychologist, Jordan Peterson, spoke of Twitter's radicalising effect in an interview conducted by GQ. He explained that for any given tweet that appears on one's "feed", the tweet shall have been seen by a far greater number of people than is reflected by its likes and comments. Therefore, who are the people who comment on a tweet? The people who comment shall be those who have the strongest views on the matter, the people who want their opinion to be heard. Peterson claims that this creates an environment in which the opinions that the average user sees on Twitter do not reflect the views of a random sample of the population. The opinions most commonly seen on Twitter tend to be those of people at each extreme end of the political ideology spectrum, hence the "radicalising effect". A recent study on TikTok showed how quickly users can be influenced by a small amount of content. When users engaged with transphobic material, the app started recommending more far-right videos. The study looked at around 450 videos on the "for-you page," which is based on TikTok's recommendation system. During the 2016 presidential election, Meta (then Facebook) conducted a study revealing that its algorithms drove a significant increase in extremist content interaction. These algorithms were accountable for 64% of all joins to extremist groups, primarily through features like "Groups You Should Join" and the "Discover" page.

The interference of social media in the 2024 Presidential Election started when businessman and entrepreneur Elon Musk bought the social media platform Twitter in 2022. According to The Guardian "Musk clinched a deal in 2022 to buy X, then Twitter, for $44bn, ending its run as a public company since its 2013 initial public offering". Under Musk's ownership, the moderation staff was significantly reduced, and the mechanisms in place to moderate misinformation were loosened. Since Musk's takeover, a Washington Post analysis found that Republican accounts gained more views and popularity after the loosening of content moderation and guidelines. Moreover, a report from Reuters found that "False or misleading claims by billionaire Elon Musk about the U.S. election have amassed 2 billion views on social media platform X this year" which amplified the spreading of misinformation. Musk has previous openly endorsed Trump and uses X to push the right wing agenda.

=== Advertisement ===
Political advertising has been used for several decades and can be a key factor in informing the audience. The "new form" has taken a different route through the "rise of digital media." This tool is different from offline advertising in the way that it takes a new form such as YouTube Videos, Reels, or advertisements shown on a webpage. Political advertising can tailor to its audience due to the algorithms of applications. Digital technology enables algorithms to track and analyze viewer interactions with media, allowing for more precise targeting.

According to Statista, political campaigns spent more money on online and social media ads, (as seen in the image). In 2019, Statista predicted that $2.90 billion would be spent in 2020, compared to $1.40 billion in 2016 and $0.16 billion in 2012. While Twitter stopped political ads, Facebook and other platforms like Pinterest, Twitch, and TikTok currently have different rules. Facebook's CEO defended the decision, arguing that blocking ads for important political issues like climate change or women's empowerment could hinder public discourse.

Political advertisements—for example, encouraging people to vote for or against a particular candidate, or to take a position on a particular issue—have often been placed on social media. On 22 November 2019, Twitter said it would no longer facilitate political advertising anywhere in the world. Due to the nature of social media bringing different information to different people based on their interests, advertising methods such as "Microtargeting" and "Black ads" have become prominent on social media and allow advertising to be much more effective for the same price, relative to traditional adverts such as those on cable TV.

=== Grassroots campaigns ===
When it comes to political referendums, individuals often gather on social media at the grassroots level to campaign for change. This is particularly effective where it comes to feminist political issues, as studies have proven that women are more likely to tweet about policy problems and do so in a way that is more aggressive than their male counter-parts. Like-minded individuals can collectively work together to influence social change and utilise social media as a tool for social justice. An example of this is in the referendum to appeal Ireland's eighth amendment. Civil society organisations, such as TogetherForYes, utilised Twitter as a tool to bring abortion law into the public and make the harms of the eighth amendment visible and accessible. The positive outcome of the referendum (in the amendments repeal) can be equated to the efforts of individuals and advocates coming together at the grassroots level to make the vote visible, as social media goes beyond the local level to create a widespread global political impact, making the issue of strict abortion laws a global one, rather than one just confined to Ireland. The strength in a political grassroots campaign on social media is the increased mobilisation of participants. Due to the fact that social media platforms are largely accessible, a political platform can be provided to the voices of those traditionally silenced in the political sphere or in traditional media. As well as bringing awareness to the campaign, social media (including Twitter) also provides a platform of conversation. Specifically when the grassroots campaign is trying to tackle a high ranking secular state such as the Catholic Church in Northern Ireland, it can be difficult to promote the campaign as the church has such influence and authority. And so can be argued that this campaign gained such momentum because of its social media awareness with voters for the movement being active and engaged on social media, with the campaign going from social media to law in less than 2 years. Social media also played a crucial role in the rise of big movements like Black Lives Matter grow quickly. People used platforms like Twitter and Instagram to share stories about police brutality, organize protests, and help getting others involved. These social media tools gave a voice to people who were often ignored and helped push for real changes in laws and policies.

Social media platforms have become a very useful tool within political advertising that allow campaigns and organizations to thoroughly target particular demographics with personalized communication. Political parties may choose voters based on their demographics, interests, and social media activity by utilizing sponsored posts and paid advertisements. This style of advertising, which often has emotional or visual content to change public opinion, supports campaigns by fast and efficiently distributing their messaging. However it also creates problems with false information, data privacy and voter manipulation with algorithm-driving tools. By enhancing exposure and engagement for major social and political causes, social media political advertising, when managed appropriately, can promote grassroots movements.

=== Organic and generative AI campaigning ===
During the 2024 and 2025 election cycles, generative AI integration transformed political campaigning drastically from manual content creation to large quantities of computer-generated material. Campaigns are now utilizing large language models to generate thousands of unique and personalized messages to new voter segments. In the past, traditional targeting relied on demographics including age and zip code. AI campaigning allows for much faster generation and real time testing amongst voter's specific profiles. This has raised ethical concerns regarding levels of deception that may be involved in deep fake audio and videos to suppress voters and misrepresent opponents' positions. Today, the barrier to entry for creating what is now considered professional grade propaganda has plummeted. This enables smaller campaigns to compete in the production of political materials of national parties. Regulations have struggled to keep pace with the speed of integration of AI within politics. The differences between AI generated content and organic content are increasingly becoming harder to decipher, challenging traditional frameworks, and transparency in political landscapes.

==== Incidental exposure and political socialization ====
A new study of research is identifying incidental exposure as a driver of modern political participation; this is changing how citizens encounter political information. Unlike traditional media environments, where individuals are seeking, social media algorithms present content through entertaining or social connection. When an individual consumes such media, it often reduces the cost of entry for political engagement, also drawing in people who are otherwise politically uninvolved. This new shift results in a phenomenon now known as shallow participation, where users consume recommended or trending media that is often fragmented or polarized from a more complex political issue. For younger groups, consuming this medium with a lack of intention typically does not bring a well-rounded understanding of a topic. Through 2025, data is suggesting a majority of first-time voters received their initial political socialization through incidental exposure. This suggests participation is becoming more dependent on social algorithms rather than an information seeking individual.

=== US election interference ===
One of the largest, recent examples of US election interference via social media relates to the January 6th attack on the United States Capitol. President Trump, after losing the 2020 election, showed his displeasure on the social media platform Twitter. Trump encouraged his supporters to protest and riot in response to the election loss. As a result, Twitter terminated his account.

The 2016 United States Presidential Election was an example in which social media was used by the state actor Russia to influence public opinion. Tactics such as propaganda, trolling, and bots were used to leak fake news stories that included an "FBI agent had been killed after leaking Clinton's emails" and "Pope Francis had endorsed Donald Trump." Studies have found that pro-Trump news was as many as four-time more than pro-Clinton fake news, and a third of the pro-Trump tweets were generated by bots. Social media has also provided the means for large amounts of data to be collected on social media users – allowing analysis and predictions to be made on what information and advertising the user is most likely to be susceptible to. This was highlighted in 2018 when the Cambridge Analytica – Facebook scandal emerged. Data and predictions from the company were used to influence voters in the 2016 Brexit/Leave campaign and also the 2016 US election Trump Campaign.

This scandal first appeared in the news in 2016 following both the UK's Brexit referendum results and the US' presidential election result but was an ongoing operation by Cambridge Analytica with the permission of Facebook using Aleksandr Kogan's app "This is your Digital Life". However, the methods were exposed on 27 September 2016 during a presentation by Alexander Nix named "The Power of Big Data and Psychographics". Nix was the chief executive officer of market-research at Cambridge Analytica. After founding the company in 2013 he was then suspended on 20 March 2018 following the release of a video in which he admitted to working directly with Donald Trump to gather data on the US electorate. In his 2016 presentation, Nix highlights his contribution the 2016 Ted Cruz campaign and how taking the focus away from demographics and geographics for the targeted ads and instead using psychographics in order to target personality traits and get a better understanding of voter demands is a more effective method of gaining votes. In 2016, one of Nix's business associates, Steve Bannon, left the company to take over the campaign of Donald Trump and as a result of the video leak which lost Nix his job it is largely believed he had direct influence too. As well as this, Cambridge Analytica staff were also heavily involved in the Vote-Leave campaign for the 2016 Brexit referendum. As a result of an organisation specialised in targeted ads being involved in two populist campaigns that produced shock results, many point out as a potential threat to democracy.

But this is not the only example of potential election interference using social media. November 1, 2015, Rodrigo Duterte was announced as president of Philippines after being 'the first person to make the full use of the power of social media'. Facebook had made an astonishing rise since the previous election and Duterte saw this as an opportunity to get social media influencers to promote his party and create viral content, further showing the power social media can have over democracy.

On 18 May 2017, Time had reported that the US Congress was investigating CA in connection with Russian interference in the 2016 United States elections. The report alleges that CA may have coordinated the spread of Russian propaganda using its microtargeting capabilities. In 2018, following disclosures that the company had improperly used the personal information of over 50 million Facebook users while working on Trump's presidential campaign, The Times of Israel reported that the company had used what Nix had called "intelligence gathering" from British and Israeli companies as part of their efforts to influence the election results in Trump's favor. This was the work of one company and regulation may be able to prevent this in the future, but social media is now a medium that makes this kind of interference possible.

=== Election results ===
In October 2020, Twitter announced its new policy that candidates will be forbidden to claim victory until their election win has been credibly projected by news outlets or officially certified.

=== Impact on elections ===
Social media has a profound effect on elections. Oftentimes, social media compounds with the mass media networks such as cable television. Cable television has commentary that creates partisanship and builds on people's predispositions to certain parties. Social media takes mass media's messages and oftentimes amplifies and reinforces such messages and perpetuates partisan divides. In an article by the Journal of Communication, they concluded that social media does not have a strong effect on people's views or votes. Instead, social media creates a bandwagon effect, when a candidate in an election commits an error or great success, then users on social media will amplify the effect of such failure or success.

However, mass media plays a significant role in the electoral process, allowing candidates to broadcast their political campaigns to a wide audience. The primary goal of these ads is to capture voter attention and propagate their ideas. During elections, media can assume a different role, with social media platforms such as TikTok, Instagram, and Facebook serving as additional ways for political candidates to communicate with their audiences. These apps also have the potential to function as effective "electoral tools."

The Pew Research Center found that nearly one fourth of Americans learn something about political candidates through an internet source such as Facebook. Nearly a fifth of America uses social media with two thirds of those Americans being youth ages of 18–29. The youth's presence on social media often inspires rallies and creates movements. For instance, in the 2008 presidential election, a Facebook group of 62,000 members was created that sponsored the election of President Obama and within days universities across the countries held rallies in the thousands. Rallies and movements such as these are often coined the "Facebook Effect". However, social media can often have the opposite effect and take a toll on many users. The Pew Research Center in a poll found that nearly 55 percent of social media users in the US indicate that they are "worn out" by the amount of political posts on social media. With the rise of technology and social media continuing, that number increased by nearly 16 percent since the 2016 presidential election. Nearly 70 percent of individuals say that talking about politics on social media with people on the opposite side is often "stressful and frustrating" compared to 56 percent in 2016. Consequently, the number of people who find these discussions as "interesting and informative" decreased from 35% to 26% since 2016.

In the 2018 elections, nearly 31 percent of youth voted compared to just 21 percent in 2014. Social media use among youth continues to grow as around 90 percent of the youth use at least one social media platform. Of the 90 percent, 47 percent received information about the 2018 elections via a social media platform. The messages shared on the social media platform include messages to register to vote and carry out their vote; this is in contrast to receiving the message from the candidate's campaign itself. Subsequently, of the first time youth voters in the 2018 election, 68 percent relied on social media to get their information about voting. This is in comparison to the traditional methods of being notified to vote of just 23 percent first time voters. Furthermore, just 22 percent of youth who did not hear about an election via social media or traditional means were very likely to vote. However, 54 percent of youth who found out about the election via social media or traditional ways were very likely to vote. Forbes notes that there has been a decline in public trust due to many political groups and foreign nations creating fake accounts to spread misinformation with the aim of dividing the country. When examining unregulated media, it is important to consider the potential harms that can arise from the spread of misinformation, such as hate speech and other harmful content.

Social media often filters what information individuals see. Due to the algorithms of social media apps, a person will receive posts that align with the content the user interacts with. Since 2008, the number of individuals who get their news via social media has increased to 62 percent. On these social media sites, there are many algorithms run that filter what information individual users see. The algorithms understand a users favorites and dislikes, they then begin to cater their feed to their likes. Consequently, this creates an echo chamber. For instance, black social media users were more likely to see race related news and in 2016 the Trump campaign used Facebook and other platforms to target Hillary Clinton's supporters to drive them out of the election and taking advantage of such algorithms. Whether or not these algorithms have an effect on people's vote and their views is mixed. Iowa State University finds that for older individuals, even though their access to social media is far lower than the youth, their political views were far more likely to change from the 1996–2012 time periods, which indicates that there are a myriad of other factors that impact political views. They further that based upon other literature, Google has a liberal bias in their search results. Consequently, these biased search results can affect an individual's voting preferences by nearly 20 percent. In addition, 23 percent of an individual's Facebook friends are of an opposing political view and nearly 29 percent of the news they receive on the platform is also in opposition of their political ideology, which indicates that the algorithms on these new platforms do not completely create echo chambers.

Washington State University political science professor Travis Ridout explains that in the United Kingdom the popular social media platforms of Twitter, Facebook, Instagram, and YouTube are beginning to play a significant role in campaigns and elections. Contrary to the United States which allows television ads, in the United Kingdom television ads are banned and thus campaigns are now launching huge efforts on social media platforms. Ridout furthers that the social media ads have gotten in many cases offensive and in attack formation at many politicians. Social media is able to provide many individuals with a sense of anonymity that enables them to get away with such aggressive acts. For example, ethnic minority women politicians are often the targets of such attacks. Furthermore, in the United States, many of the youth conservative voices are often reduced. For instance, PragerU, a conservative organization, often has their videos taken down. On a different level, social media can also hamper many political candidates. Media and social media often publish stories about news that are controversial and popular and will ultimately drive more traffic. A key example is President Donald Trump whose controversial statements in 2016 often brought the attention of many individuals and thereby increased his popularity while shunning out other candidates.

In the 2020 Presidential Election, social media was very prevalent and used widely by both campaigns. For Twitter, nearly 87 million users follow President Donald Trump while 11 million users follow Joe Biden. Despite the significant gap between the two, Biden's top tweets have outperformed Donald Trump's top tweets by nearly double. In terms of mentions of each candidate on Twitter, from October 21 to October 23, there were 6.6 million mentions of Trump and Biden and Biden held 72% of the mentions. During the 2020 Presidential Debates, Biden had nearly two times the mentions as Donald Trump with nearly half of the mentions being negative. For Trump, he also had half of his mentions being negative as well.

In Europe, the influence of social media is less than that of the United States. In 2011, only 34% of MEPs use twitter, while 68% use Facebook. In 2012, the EPP had the highest social media following of 7,418 compared to the other parties. This is in relationship to the 375 million voters in all of Europe. When comparing the impact to US social media following, former President Obama has over 27 million fans while the highest in Europe was former French President Nicolas Sarkozy of over 700,000 fines, a stark difference. The 2008 US presidential election skyrocketed the need for technologies to be used in politics and campaigns, especially social media. Europe is now following their lead and has been increasing their use of social media since. However, just because European Politicians do not use social media as much as American Politicians does not mean that social media platforms such as Facebook and Twitter do not play a large role in European Politics- in particular- Elections. In the run-up to the 2017 German Bundestag Elections, a group of extremists used social media platforms such as Twitter and YouTube in hopes of gaining support for the far-right group Alternative für Deutschland. Despite being limited in numbers, the group were able to publish "patriotic videos" that managed to get on to the Trending tab on YouTube as well as being able to trend the hashtag "#AfD" on Twitter. Though polled to come 5th in the election, Alternative für Deutschland won 13.3% of the vote, making them the third largest party within the Bundestag, making them the first far-right party to enter the building since 1961

In the UK, Cambridge Analytica was allegedly hired as a consultant company for Leave.EU and the UK Independence Party during 2016, as an effort to convince people to support Brexit. These rumours were the result of the leaked internal emails that were sent between Cambridge Analytica firm and the British parliament. These datasets composed of the data obtained from Facebook were said to be work done as an initial job deliverable for them. Although Arron Banks, co-founder of Leave.EU, denied any involvement with the company, he later declared "When we said we'd hired Cambridge Analytica, maybe a better choice of words could have been deployed." The official investigation by the UK Information Commissioner found that Cambridge Analytica was not involved "beyond some initial enquiries" and the regulator did not identify any "significant breaches" of data protection legislation or privacy or marketing regulations "which met the threshold for formal regulatory action" In early July 2018, the United Kingdom's Information Commissioner's Office announced it intended to fine Facebook £500,000 ($663,000) over the data breach, this being the maximum fine allowed at the time of the breach, saying Facebook "contravened the law by failing to safeguard people's information". In 2014 and 2015, the Facebook platform allowed an app that ended up harvesting 87 million profiles of users around the world that was then used by Cambridge Analytica in the 2016 presidential campaign and in the Brexit referendum. Although Cambridge Analytica were cleared, questions were still raised with how they came to access these Facebook profiles and target voters that would not have necessarily voted in this matter in the first place. Dominic Cummings the prime minister's ex aide had a majority in involving Cambridge Analytica in the Leave.EU campaign, this can be seen in the real accounts of Brexit: The Uncivil War.

In terms of analyzing the role of fake news in social media, there tends to be about three times more fake new articles that were more likely to be pro-Trump over pro-Clinton articles. There were 115 pro-Trump fake news articles while only 41 pro-Clinton fake news articles; pro-Trump articles were shared 30.3 million times while pro-Clinton articles were shared 7.6 million times on Facebook. For each share there is about 20 page visits which means that with around 38 million shares of fake news articles there are 760 million page views to these articles. This means that roughly each US adult visited a fake news site three times. Whether the spread of fake news has an impact on elections is conflicted as more research is required and is difficult to place a quantification on the effects. However, fake news is more likely to influence individuals who are over 65 and are more conservative. These groups tend to believe fake news more than other groups. College students have difficulty in determining if an article shared on social media is fake news. The same study also concluded that conspiratorial beliefs could be predicted by a person's political party affiliation or their ideological beliefs. For example, those that Republican or held a more conservative belief were far more likely to believe in baseless theories such as that of former President Obama being born outside of the United States; and those that voted Democrat or held a more liberal belief would be more likely to believe in conspiracies such as former President Bush having played a role in the 9/11 attacks.

==== 2024 European election ====
TikTok usage by the far-right Alternative für Deutschland in the 2024 European election is said to have effectively leveraged the party's traction, especially by gaining significant traction among young voters. According to a 2024 report by Bildungsstätte Anne Frank, the AfD's active presence on TikTok considerably increased its support in voters between ages 16 to 24. Research by funk media group indicated that the AfD benefited from TikTok's algorithm, which promotes controversial and engaging content. The AfD's strategy involved posting succinct and compelling messages that performed well on the platform. This approach resulted in high engagement rates, extending their reach further. Concerns have been raised, as many AfD-associated accounts do not clearly disclose their affiliation and spread misinformation multiple times.

===== Digital incumbency =====
Early digital campaigns used to be viewed as a disruptor employed by empowered grassroots outsiders, the mid 2020s have experienced the rise of digital use established political figures now purchase and leverage large data sets. By targeting different channels of voters these political figures can create "algorithmic moats" that are difficult for challengers to breach. By constantly using media and high levels of resources during campaigns they essentially keep their digital infrastructures always on. This maintains voter engagement during and between election cycles. During this never-ending cycle, these methods become nationalized and make it harder for new voices to gain an organic reach. Levels of concentration of digital use allow individuals to dominate the information environment online, since algorithms always favor accounts with high historical engagement. Managing social media 24/7 in many cases has reinforced existing power structures, since challengers find themselves suppressed by the pay to play nature of these platforms. All while funded campaigners purchase sophisticated data analytics personal monitors and targeted ad spending. Social media continues to push itself further into democratization and serve as a mechanism for status.

=== Social media's impact on political accountability ===
Studies show that social media influences voting by increasing voter turnout through peer pressure. Social media plays a role in organizing protests, by spreading information, coordinating actions, and mobilizing large groups.

Social media has undeniably transformed political engagement by providing people with a space to express themselves, facilitating the formation of communities, and allowing for rapid communication.

Politicians online activity appears to reduce their focus on offline political efforts. This shift from offline to online political activity raises concerns about political accountability, as it suggests that legislators might prioritize social media engagement over more direct, traditional actions that could benefit their constituents in the real world.

Audience Share Bias is one of the most well-documented forms of bias, where media outlets prioritize coverage of issues that appeal to a large portion of their audience. Politically, this can disadvantage smaller groups, like minorities and special interests, while benefiting larger groups, such as majority ethnic populations and broad consumer interests.

Accountability, closely tied to democratic control over power and politics, is not only crucial for the political communication process but also fundamental to democratic values (such as human rights and freedoms) and institutions (like NGOs and parliaments). It ensures that state authorities are held responsible for addressing the concerns raised by the public.

After a brief period of optimism regarding the potential of social media to foster a golden age of global democratization, there is now growing concern across various sectors—such as the media, academia, philanthropy, civil society, and even politics—that social media may be eroding democracy. This apprehension is not limited to newer or fragile democracies, which are more susceptible to democratic decline, but also extends to some of the world's oldest and most established democracies, including the United States.

Social media has transformed politics in the 21st century, making platforms like Twitter, Facebook, Instagram, and TikTok important for campaigning and activism. Political arguments now unfold in real-time, allowing people to engage directly with politicians, share opinions, and rally support without relying on traditional media. This shift amplifies voices and encourages collective action. It also enables citizen journalists to highlight important issues. The speed and accessibility of social media have made politics more interactive and participatory than ever before.

Social media has become a powerful tool for political activism by allowing people to organize protests, raise awareness, and challenge authority without limitations, as seen in movements like #BlackLivesMatter and #MeToo. It enhances political accountability by giving citizens a platform similar to leaders. It also risks spreading misinformation and deepening divisions, making it both a force for democracy and a potential threat to it.

=== Social Media Effects on Political Party Strategies ===
==== Hybrid Media Systems ====
Social media platforms have transformed political communication from a series of short-term campaign tools into a long-term strategy for organizational adaptation. Modern political parties now operate within a hybrid media system, an environment where the logic of digital platforms, defined by data processing, networking, and viral mechanisms, constantly intertwines with traditional media structures like newspapers and television. They combine digital and traditional media to build credibility rather than replacing one with the other. A central practice in this environment is the bypass strategy, where political actors use social media to reach the public directly, avoiding the "gatekeepers" of traditional journalism. However, parties still depend on the mainstream coverage of news to offer institutional legitimacy and "rhetorical support" for their viral messages. Political actors use social media to communicate their messages without having to rely on traditional journalists for approval. They can release a statement on the social media platforms and set the agenda before the traditional media even reports the news. This becomes more significant when the traditional media, like newspapers or television pick up the story and give it more credibility. This process gains additional weight once this content is picked up by newspapers or television stations and receives institutional recognition. This interaction is referred to as hybrid media logic.

This involves identifying recurring patterns within hybrid media systems. One example of this is "agenda seeding," in which parties deliberately place content online in order to trigger its subsequent adoption by traditional news media, and "agenda rippling", where social media content is used to predict or influence future newspaper coverage. The deliberate distribution of journalistic content on social media platforms is another trend. To bolster their own claims using outside sources, parties use platforms to distribute newspaper articles or television stories. On the other hand, reporters are increasingly incorporating tweets, videos, and livestreams into their reporting and using social media feeds as primary sources.

Political science research shows that digital strategies are really influenced by the rules of the government. Consequently, it is not the media system that decides if communication strategies are more about the party or the candidate. The electoral system is also important. In countries with systems where people vote for a party and seats are divided based on the number of votes parties use the internet to make their party look good and show that they agree on things. Parties use media to talk about what they do, in parliament send out news to the press or share positive things that people say about them in the news. In presidential or majority voting systems, on the other hand, institutional incentives favor more personalized strategies and direct forms of communication.

In candidate-centered contexts, many politicians build their own brand identities. Therefore, they use various platforms to present themselves. Instagram is used to share their campaign events or personal stories, videos on TikTok are there to connect with their followers in a relaxed and genuine way. Such practices help them build a connection with their followers and rely less on traditional media. Using media in this way can strengthen the direct bond between candidates and their sup- porters and reduce their dependence on traditional media. At the time, factors such as party lists, media access rules, and campaign financing are still very important in determining how much personalization is possible in a campaign.

The structure of the party system also influences digital strategies. In countries with many parties, social media intensifies the battle for attention because many actors are vying for limited public attention. In systems with only two major parties, on the other hand, digital communication spaces can be more polarized. The competing camps use the platforms to mobilize their respective voters.

=== TikTok use in U.S political party strategies (2020-2024) ===
Recently presidential communication has seemed to expand onto other social media platforms like TikTok. In 2020 Trump demanded to ban TikTok since it appeared as a threat due to it being owned by a Chinese owner. Trump believed that TikTok was a main threat to the national security and wanted it banned or bought by a non-Chinese owner immediately. The original date approved by Congress and accepted by the Supreme Court for the TikTok ban was January 19. The app ban lasted about a day or two the most, Trump extended the deadline to 90 days in hopes to find a non Chinese buyer or ultimately be banned from the US. Trump decided to stop the ban after joining the TikTok community while running for president in 2024. Trump's actions towards banning the app was towards his belief that TikTok was the reason he won the 2024 election by gaining young voters support. Since then Trump has been a supporter of TikTok and is willing to defend the app. Trump's TikTok username is, "@realdonaldtrump" and has nearly 15.1 million followers. Trump's TikTok account insists on short videos that consist of trends happening on TikTok or trending audios to catch viewers attention and communicate that "relatable" feeling.

==== TikTok strategy and Political parties ====
As mentioned before, during the 2024 election cycle, TikTok played a big part in digital campaign strategies for both political parties. Democratic strategists publicly discussed including using TikTok in hopes of having a better connection with younger voters and turning campaign messages into short videos that are common on TikTok. Reporters indicated that Democratic campaigns saw the app as a space to be able to communicate policy positions in a less formal manner, a more conversational style that aligns with the platform's norms.

The Republican National Committee also announced the expanded efforts to create a structured presence on TikTok, describing the platform as a useful tool for reaching key voter demographics and bumping digital engagement following the 2024 election cycle. RNC encouraged Republican candidates to follow Trump's lead of joining TikTok during the 2024 election as it would benefit the party in gaining a lead in voters. An academic analysis was made on TikTok engagement throughout the 2024 U.S election and found that political content on TikTok relied on partisan and toxically charged videos. Mainly shown on content made about immigration and election fraud caused the most engagement by users. All together, these sources show how TikTok has become a part of contemporary presidential and party communication strategies.

===== Music and copyright controversies =====
The use of trending music and audio clips in political TikTok videos has generated controversy with artists. Many musicians publicly objected to the use of their songs being used in any campaign related social media post, mentioning that their work has been used without approval or endorsement for political messaging. These posts often created controversies on whether campaign or political content associated the artist with political beliefs they did not support.

In specific cases, artists such as Olivia Rodrigo and Sabrina Carpenter requested removal with Republican campaign videos that included their music in TikTok posts and other platform posts. Both singers stated that they did not agree with the use of their songs. Stating that they did not support the political message associated with the videos. These disputes show broader tensions between political campaigns and musicians over the use of copyrighted material in political posts.

===== Organizational transformation =====
The rise of digital platforms has had a profound effect on the internal dynamics of political parties. Instead of broad membership organizations, smaller groups of experts and strategic decision-makers who control data analysis, online advertising, and digital infrastructure are gaining influence. In a longitudinal study, parties are permanently establishing so-called "backstage" voter databases and analysis tools as infrastructure and increasingly employing technical staff even outside of election campaigns. This often leads to "field crossing," which means that specialists from the technology industry are recruited to bring commercial expertise to political campaigns.

This development is linked to an increasing dependence on platform companies. Research shows that companies such as Facebook, Google, and Twitter not only offer technical services, but also provide strategic consulting and maintain their own party-specific teams. This was examined at the Democratic Party convention in 2016, among other places. These firms provide a subsidy of expertise, where for-profit companies perform core party functions such as identifying supporters and optimizing digital ads to increase engagement and donations.

This dependence is part of datafication, the quantification of user activities to detect public profiles, which parties use for personalized electioneering, sending customized messages based on a user's specific interests. Messages are to be customized in order to increase reach and mobilization. Meanwhile, as platform operators can influence the visibility of political content through algorithmic adjustments, a structural dependence on digital intermediaries arises.

====== Power shifts and new forms of participation ======
Power relations within the party are also influenced by platformization. Richard S. There is a development toward a "cartel party" in which professional leadership elites gain in importance and traditional membership structures lose influence. At the same time, new forms of digital participation are emerging. The term "citizen campaigners" describe politically engaged citizens who are active online but are not formal party members.

Comparative studies from Germany, Italy, and the United Kingdom show that social media can reduce barriers to participation and lessen differences between members and non-members. In order to respond to the difficult-to-control dynamics of digital supporters, parties often pursue a strategy of "controlled interactivity": social media is mainly used for mobilization, self-presentation, and the dissemination of key messages, while deliberative elements are limited.

====== Reorientation of competition and communication ======
In view of the decline in traditional party membership, parties are increasingly relying on low- threshold support models, such as free online registration. This allows them to expand their base of supporters without extending formal voting rights. Party organization is evolving from a traditional mass party to an expanded network of digitally connected actors.

The use of individual platforms is also subject to strategic considerations. Since the late 2000s, YouTube, then Facebook and Twitter, have gained in importance; since the mid-2010s, visual platforms such as Instagram and TikTok have been playing an increasingly important role. The frequency of posts and the choice of platform depend on resources, party size, status in government, and ideological orientation. It is characteristic of election campaign phases that online activity increases. The digital adaptability of political parties is also influenced by organizational path dependencies. Parties' openness to technological innovations is influenced by previous strategies, human resources, and experiences, such as election defeats. Overall, digital competitive adaptation is considered crucial for the long-term ability of political parties to act in the platform age.

===== Strategic communication in platform environments =====
====== Platform logics ======
Research findings emphasize that social media platforms are founded on certain technical and algorithmic rules that influence content accessibility and user engagement. Parties with more extensive organizational resources tend to have a stronger presence on established platforms. In contrast, smaller or emerging parties may be quicker to switch to newer platforms in order to differentiate themselves from others.

Parties are constrained by the application layer of the internet, the specific software environments and algorithms of sites like Facebook or TikTok that define the boundaries of political action. The technical nature of these platforms compels actors to abide by the rules of the attention economy, where human attention is considered a precious commercial resource. This situation emphasizes popularity and virality, which is the rapid dissemination of content driven by algorithms that favor extreme emotional engagement. As platform rules change very quickly, actors find themselves in a never-ending battle for power, constantly adjusting their internal rules to stay relevant in a digital space they no longer control.

Empirical studies show that the rate of posting, the choice of platforms, and communication patterns vary depending on the size of the actor, its ideological orientation, and its government status. Populist parties use a higher posting rate and emotionally charged messages, while mainstream parties more often integrate digital communication into hybrid strategies that refer to traditional media sources. New platforms such as TikTok offer specific opportunities, including short video formats and interactive features such as the "duet" function, which allows users to respond directly to existing content. These options promote more participatory and performative political communication.

====== Intermedia agenda-setting and professionalization ======
The interaction between digital and traditional media has been conceptualized as "intermedial agenda setting." There are interactions between the content of social media and the reporting of newspapers. Online media can be utilized by political actors to shape the news agenda of traditional media. But they can also rely on already existing media reporting to improve their credibility.

A higher degree of volatility in political communication is associated with the rapid dissemination of online content, the role of decentralized actors, and the threat of disinformation. The loss of traditional membership has given way to the rise of audience democracy, where electors function as passive viewers of professionalized digital spectacles rather than active agents. To ensure their survival, established organizations may function as cartel parties, joining their technological resources to exclude the volatile influence of outsider internet movements. These parties often use low-threshold models, such as registered supporters who register online for free or a small fee, to appear popular and rejuvenated without granting these new participants real power over core policy decisions or leadership selection.

== Role in conflict ==
Social media plays a significant role in modern conflicts in several ways.

1. It shapes how information is framed and shared on mainstream platforms, often limiting open and balanced communication.
2. News stories can quickly go viral, sometimes leading to misunderstandings or misinterpretations that escalate tensions.
3. Political and organizational leaders have shifted their focus from traditional administrative strategies to engaging with and adapting to new media technologies.
4. Because social media is largely unregulated, easy to use, and accessible, it can contribute to political, economic, and social conflicts on both a local and global scale.

The role of technological communication and social media in the world can lead to political, economic, and social conflict due to its unmonitored system, cheap interface, and accessibility.

=== Weaponization by state actors ===
Social media platforms have been weaponized by state-sponsored cyber groups to attack governments in the United States, the European Union, and the Middle East. Although phishing attacks via email are the most commonly used tactic to breach government networks, phishing attacks on social media rose 500% in 2016. As with email-based phishing attacks, the majority of phishing attacks on social media are financially motivated cyber crimes that install malware. However, cyber groups associated with Russia, Iran, and China have used social media to conduct cyberattacks and undermine democratic processes in the West. During the 2017 French presidential election, for example, Facebook detected and removed fake accounts linked to the Russian cyber group Fancy Bear, who were posing as "friends of friends" of Emmanuel Macron associates to steal information from them. Cyber groups associated with Iran, China, and Russia have used LinkedIn to steal trade secrets, gain access to critical infrastructure, or recruit spies. These social engineering attacks can be multi-platform, with threat actors initiating contact on one platform but continuing communication on more private channel. The Iranian-backed cyber group COBALT GYPSY created a fake persona across multiple social media platforms and initiated contact on LinkedIn before moving to Facebook and email.

In December 2019, a chat and video calling application developed by the United Arab Emirates, called ToTok was identified as a spying tool by the US intelligence. Suspicion over the Emirati app emerged because it banned the use of VoIP on applications like WhatsApp, FaceTime and Skype.

==== People's Republic of China ====
Spamouflage (also known under the names Dragonbridge, Spamouflage Dragon, Storm 1376 and Taizi Flood) is an online propaganda and disinformation operation. Since 2017, it has used a network of social media accounts to make posts in favor of the Chinese Communist Party and government of the People's Republic of China and harass dissidents and journalists overseas.

==== United States ====
According to a report by Reuters, in 2019 the United States CIA began a clandestine campaign on Chinese social media to spread negative narratives about the general secretaryship of Xi Jinping in an effort to influence Chinese public opinion against the government. The CIA promoted narratives that Chinese Communist Party (CCP) leaders were hiding money overseas and that the Belt and Road Initiative was corrupt and wasteful. As part of the campaign, the CIA also targeted foreign countries where the United States and China compete for influence.

According to a report by Reuters, the United States ran a propaganda campaign to spread disinformation about the Sinovac Chinese COVID-19 vaccine, including using fake social media accounts to spread the disinformation that the Sinovac vaccine contained pork-derived ingredients and was therefore haram under Islamic law. The campaign was described as "payback" for COVID-19 disinformation by China directed against the U.S. The campaign primarily targeted people in the Philippines and used a social media hashtag for "China is the virus" in Tagalog. The campaign ran from 2020 to mid-2021. The primary contractor for the U.S. military on the project was General Dynamics IT, which received $493 million for its role.

== See also ==
- After Truth: Disinformation and the Cost of Fake News
- Influence of mass media#Political importance of mass media
- Mass media and American politics
- Political communication#Role of social media
- Politico-media complex
- Propaganda through media
- Russian interference in the 2016 United States elections
  - Timeline of Russian interference in the 2016 United States elections / Timeline of Russian interference in the 2016 United States elections (July 2016–election day)
- Social media and political communication in the United States
- Social media in the 2016 United States presidential election
- Social media in the 2020 United States presidential election
- Far-right usage of social media
