= Twitter bomb =

Posting numerous tweets with the same hashtags

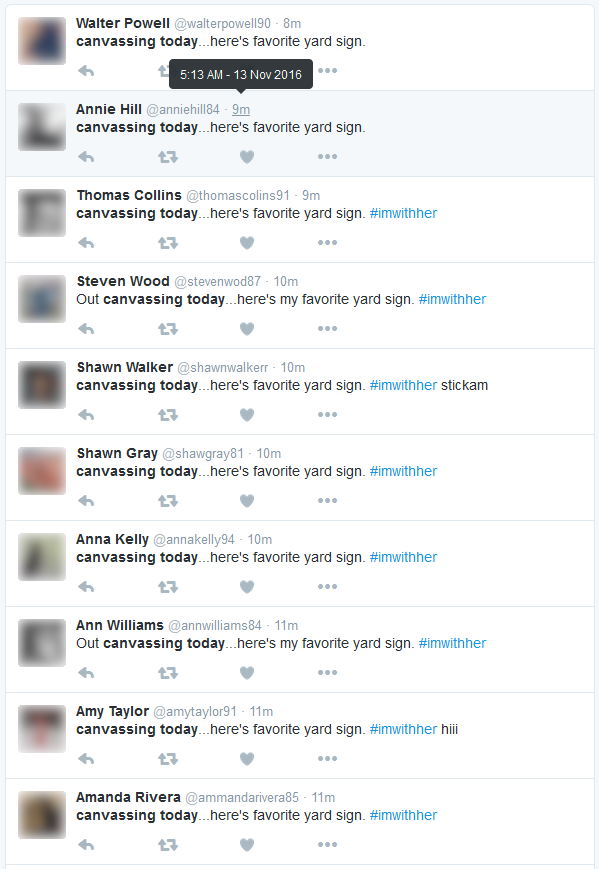
Twitter bots posting similar pro-Clinton messages with the #imwithher hashtag, during the 2016 United States elections

The term Twitter bomb or tweet bomb (also spelled as one word) refers to posting numerous (pejoratively, "spamming") posts with the same hashtags and other similar content, including @messages, from multiple accounts, with the goal of advertising a certain meme, usually by filling people's post feeds with the same message, and making it a "trending topic" on X (formerly Twitter). This may be done by individual users, fake accounts, or both.

== Advertising ==
Twitter bombing may be used for commercial advertising. An early example from April 2005 referred to advertising a YouTube video series Ask a Ninja.

== Politics ==
Twitter bombing is one of the tools used in Internet activism, both by mainstream politicians like Barack Obama and by groups like Anonymous.

The earliest recorded usage of the Twitter bomb is from August 2008, when it was used by bloggers Liza Sabater and Kenneth Quinnell in response to Republican use of the #dontgo hashtag relating to offshore oil drilling. The term was used for other purposes in 2008, but the other meanings have since disappeared.

An example of a Twitter bomb was the campaign organized by online activists in response to a July 31, 2009 Washington Post article on Hillary Clinton that was deemed sexist.

In 2011, it was used extensively by Barack Obama's campaign staff to encourage his followers to contact Congress and encourage them to reach a compromise during the United States debt-ceiling crisis of 2011. Shortly thereafter, @BarackObama lost about 37,000 followers.

== Impact ==
Twitter bombing/spamming can provide exposure to current events that are not being exposed from mainstream media. Dhiraj Murthy writes:

Twitter has received significant media attention in its use to disseminate information during disasters, including the 2008 Mumbai bomb blasts (Dolnick, 2005) and the January 2005 crash of US Airways flight 1549 (Beaumont, 2009).

Twitter bombing has also been used by activists:

- Global South visibility: During Nigeria's 2020 #EndSARS protests, activists used Twitter bombing with coordinated hashtag campaigns bypassed local media censorship, drawing global attention to police brutality.
- Climate activism: Youth movements like Fridays for Future deployed Twitter bomb campaigns synchronizing mass hashtag posts to amplify climate demands globally.
- Fandom activism: During 2020 U.S. social justice protests, K-pop fans flooded opposition hashtags with fancams, disrupting surveillance efforts.

Linking this with the use of hashtag, news and information can be spread around the internet at a rapid pace with the use of hashtags.

== Comparison to online spam ==
The use of the Twitter bomb tactics has been known to misfire, as people might be offended by spamming, or trolling.

Spammers have several goals, which are phishing, advertising, or malware distribution. Unlike traditional online spamming, such as email, X has a limit of only 280 characters per post. Therefore, a Twitter bomb often include URLs in their posts in order to send others users to their malicious pages online.

Unlike email spam, Twitter bombs may require participation from their targeted users. Fake accounts are a common source of Twitter bombs. In order to avoid X's spam filters and to overcome their lack of followers, Twitter bombs are often sent as a reply to existing posts about the same topic. This is done in hopes that the authors of the existing posts will repost the response to their own followers, spreading the Twitter bomb before the fake account is deleted.

With regards to numbers, an example of a Twitter bomb analyzed in one research paper described how nine fake user accounts produced 929 posts in 138 minutes, all with a URL to a political website, presenting negative views on the U.S. politician Martha Coakley. The message might have reached about 60,000 before being eliminated by X as spam.

== Criticism ==
Many Twitter/X users find comfort in sharing their ideas and thoughts to the general public. Though X can be utilized to spread awareness of a variety of issues and causes, many can take advantage and post numerous posts that may be viewed as spam. X's rule page considers posts "spam" once a user displays multiple posts with unrelated hashtags to a certain topic, or continues to post multiple posts of the same content in one account. Some instances, these posts can be viewed as trolling once they begin to seek out other X users for arguments about controversial issues.

== See also ==
- Google bomb
- Social bot
