= NYT first said =

Twitter bot

NYT_first_said
- Profile picture of NYT_first_said
- Website type: Twitter account
- Available in: English
- Creator: Max Bittker
- Website: twitter.com/NYT_first_said (March 2017 – July 2023) botsin.space/@nyt_first_said (December 2022 – early 2025) bsky.app/profile/nyt-first-said.bsky.social
- Launched: March 2017; 9 years ago
- Current status: Active

@NYT_first_said is a bot account on Twitter, Mastodon, and Bluesky that tracks every time The New York Times, an American newspaper, uses a word it has not previously published. It was inspired by a previous Twitter bot by Allison Parrish that also tweeted single English words at a time. @NYT_first_said scans hourly for new words (in lowercase and without hash tags) published by the Times, operating on a modified version of NewsDiffs. Its more popular posts tend to be current events-related or slang, and many new posts come from the Times' Food and Style sections. Commentators on @NYT_first_said contended that it reflected the effect the Times and the English language as a whole have on each other.

== History and structure ==
@NYT_first_said was created in 2017 by Max Bittker, an artist and engineer. It was inspired by @everyword, a bot by Allison Parrish that made 109,157 tweets of English words. @NYT_first_said similarly tweets out single words at a time, scanning hourly what The New Yorker assessed in 2023 to be 240,000 words each weekday and 140,000 each weekend day to find newly published words that mark that word's first appearance in the Times' digital archives, which go back to 1851. The bot operates on a modified version of NewsDiffs, a deprecated project adapted by Bittker to suit the project's needs. To exclude names, Internet trends, and other large sources of neologisms, the bot only tweets lowercase words that do not contain hash tags or other Internet-related symbols. Bittker operates a second bot, @NYT_said_where, that replies to the posts of NYT_first_said with a link to the article where the word appears.

Bittker sat for an interview on @NYT_first_said with the Times in 2019, where he expressed the hope that the bot could eventually tweet out its own name. The bot would go on to do so when the Times published the piece.

As of September 2024, the bot had not posted to Twitter since July 2023, but posts to a Mastodon instance.

== Analysis and reception ==
The bots' more popular posts come when the Times uses more lively slang words, such as "shooketh", "deadass", and "gaytriarchy"; words related to social trends, such as portmanteaus of "influencer"; and words related to current political events, such as "shithole". As of July 2019, "shithole", which stemmed from comments made by then-President Donald Trump, was @NYT_first_said's most liked post, followed by "deadass"; the former tweet caused the account to go from having 300 followers to 30,000. The bot's tweet of "gobshite" in June 2020, printed in the Times as an excerpt of Roddy Doyle's Love, was met with significant reaction on Irish Twitter and became the bot's most-liked Tweet of that month. Bittker speculated that these "naughty" words were more popular because they contrasted against the Times' reputation, that reputation being the reason Bittker chose that paper in the first place. While political and current events make up some of the bot's more popular posts, the Food and Style sections account for most of the bot's new posts.

Alexandra Symonds of the Times and Max Norman of The New Yorker note that a word being used in the Times, especially as it pertains to gender and sexuality, can mark a milestone in an idea being noticed by the mainstream. Norman elaborates that @NYT_first_said serves as a sort of record, an important mark of the push and pull of the Times on the English language and vice versa. While Norman lightly criticized the bot for distilling the sum of the work of The New York Times into a feed that can be posted mildly unseriously by a Twitter bot, he also wrote that the bot serves as a reminder of the joy that can be found in exploring language anew.

== See also ==
- Neologism
- Hapax legomenon
