= Schizoposting =

Posting seemingly disjointed and conspiratorial content

A general schizopost in the form of a rage comic

Schizoposting is the act of posting content that is "fragmented, disjointed, and conspiratorial." Schizoposts usually consist of violent or disturbing images, text, and videos with extreme semiotic quantity and use of word salad. The intentions of a schizoposter can vary based on the type of post made. The term has been criticized for perpetuating stereotypes of schizophrenics.

== Usage ==
General schizoposts often contain acts of violence, religious psychosis, suicide, depression, and unconventional iconography. The poster is usually not under psychosis and is mimicking the symptoms as a form of post-ironic humor and psychological horror.

More political schizoposts have recurring themes of government surveillance, brainwashing, cryptography, targeted individuals, and other ideas within conspiracy theories. This type of post's message may not be ironic and may take the form of extremist propaganda.

The term has also been used to denote posts made by people who are experiencing genuine psychosis, such as the phrase "AI schizoposting" referring to posts made by someone under chatbot psychosis.

== Analysis ==
Schizoposting has seen popularity on platforms like Twitter, 4chan, and Reddit, especially within alt-right communities. The prevalence of it within these communities has been seen as a form of algorithmic radicalization, affecting users' worldview by making them question "if their reality is real." PubMed writers Jim Johansson and Dave Holmes suggest that future research should aim to better understand individuals who engage in the Schizoposting community, so that "appropriate interventions may be proposed."

== Reception ==
Psych Central's mental health podcast criticized schizoposting for "desensitizing and encouraging others to violent impulses and unpredictable behavior", "cosplaying" mental illness and perpetuating the stigma that people with schizophrenia are "homicidal, suicidal, sociopathic, psychopathic, violent, and insane."

In a speech by Sophie Publig at the Deleuze and Guattari Studies Conference, they argue that Schizoposting should not be understood as appropriation but as widening the communication of repressed desires.

== See also ==
- Apophenia
- Creativity and mental health
- Outsider art § Art of the mentally ill
- Shitposting
- Zalgo text
