= Bots on X =

Type of software bot that uses the Twitter API

An X bot or a Twitter bot is a type of software bot that controls an X (formerly Twitter) account via the platform's API. The social bot software may autonomously perform actions such as tweeting, retweeting, liking, following, unfollowing, or direct messaging other accounts. The automation of X accounts is governed by a set of automation rules that outline proper and improper uses of automation. Proper usage includes broadcasting helpful information, automatically generating interesting or creative content, and automatically replying to users via direct message. Improper usage includes circumventing API rate limits, violating user privacy, spamming, and sockpuppeting. X bots may be part of a larger botnet. They can be used to influence elections and in misinformation campaigns.

X's policies do allow non-abusive bots, such as those created as a benign hobby or for artistic purposes, or posting helpful information, although price changes introduced to the previously free API service in June 2023 resulted in many such accounts closing.

== Types ==
=== Positive influence ===
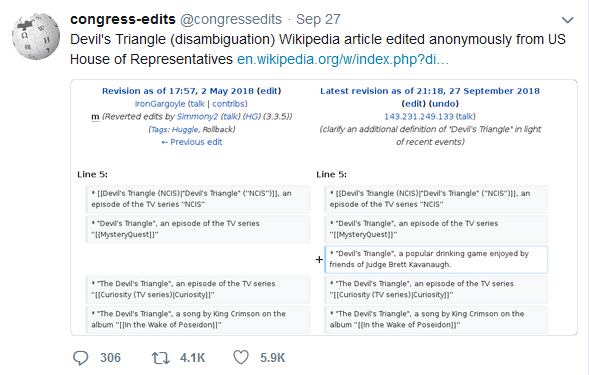
The @congressedits X bot posted when Wikipedia articles were edited anonymously from IP addresses within the ranges assigned to the United States Congress.

Many non-malicious bots are popular for their entertainment value. However, as technology and the creativity of bot-makers improves, so does the potential for Twitter bots that fill social needs. @tinycarebot is a Twitter bot that encourages followers to practice self care, and brands are increasingly using automated Twitter bots to engage with customers in interactive ways. One anti-bullying organization has created @TheNiceBot, which attempts to combat the prevalence of mean tweets by automatically tweeting kind messages.

In June 2023, Twitter began charging $100 per month for basic access to its API, resulting in many entertainment bots being suspended or taken down.

=== Political ===
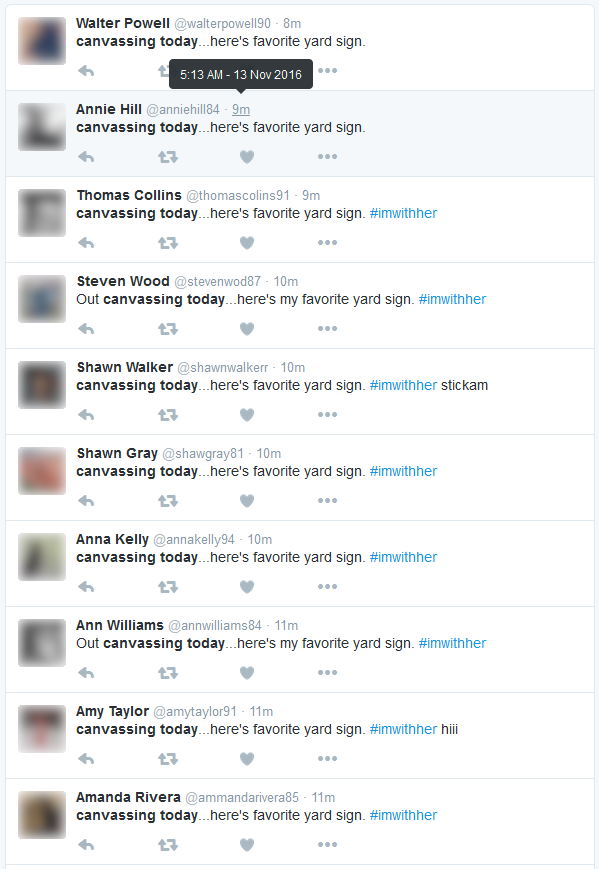
Twitter bots posting similar pro-Clinton messages during the 2016 United States elections

Concerns about political Twitter bots include the promulgation of malicious content, increased polarization, and the spreading of fake news. A subset of Twitter bots programmed to complete social tasks played an important role in the United States 2016 Presidential Election. Researchers estimated that pro-Trump bots generated four tweets for every pro-Clinton automated account and out-tweeted pro-Clinton bots 7:1 on relevant hashtags during the final debate. Deceiving Twitter bots fooled candidates and campaign staffers into retweeting misappropriated quotes and accounts affiliated with incendiary ideals. Twitter bots have also been documented to influence online politics in Venezuela. In 2019, 20% of the global Twitter trends were found to be created automatically using bots originating from Turkey. It is reported that 108,000 bot accounts were bulk tweeting to push 19,000 keywords to top trends in Turkey, to promote slogans such as political campaigns related to the 2019 Turkish local elections.

In November 2022, Chinese bots coordinately flooded Twitter with garbage information (e.g. online gambling ads) so as to distract the users' attention away from the protests. These bots, disguised as attractive girls, hashtagged the major cities in China.

In 2023, Israel signed millions of dollars in contracts with Trump linked firms to use bots and influence AI, launching a pro Israel propaganda campaign targeting millions of Christian church goers in order to win back Republican support for Israel

=== Fake followers ===
The majority of Twitter accounts following public figures and brands are often fake or inactive, making the number of Twitter followers a celebrity has a difficult metric for gauging popularity. While this cannot always be helped, some public figures who have gained or lost huge quantities of followers in short periods of time have been accused of discreetly paying for Twitter followers. For example, the Twitter accounts of Sean Combs, Rep Jared Polis (D-Colo), PepsiCo, Mercedes-Benz, and 50 Cent have come under scrutiny for possibly engaging in the buying and selling of Twitter followers, which is estimated to be between a $40 million and $360 million business annually. Account sellers may charge a premium for more realistic accounts that have Twitter profile pictures and bios and retweet the accounts they follow. In addition to an ego boost, public figures may gain more lucrative endorsement contracts from inflated Twitter metrics. For brands, however, the translation of online buzz and social media followers into sales has recently come under question after The Coca-Cola Company disclosed that a corporate study revealed that social media buzz does not create a spike in short term sales.

== Identification ==
It is sometimes desirable to identify when a Twitter account is controlled by an internet bot. Following a test period, Twitter rolled out labels to identify bot accounts and automated tweets in February 2022.

Detecting non-human Twitter users has been of interest to academics.

In a 2012 paper, Chu et al. propose the following criteria that indicate that an account may be a bot (they were designing an automated system):

- "Periodic and regular timing" of tweets;
- Whether the tweet content contains known spam; and
- The ratio of tweets from mobile versus desktop, as compared to an average human Twitter user.

Emilio Ferrara at the University of Southern California used artificial intelligence to identify Twitter bots. He found that humans reply to other tweets four or five times more than bots and that bots continue to post longer tweets over time. Bots also post at more regular time gaps, for example, tweeting at 30-minute or 60-minute intervals.

Indiana University has developed a free service called Botometer (formerly BotOrNot), which scores Twitter handles based on their likelihood of being a Twitterbot.

Recent research from EPFL argued that classifying a Twitter account as bot or not may not be always possible because hackers take over human accounts and use them as bots temporarily or permanently and in parallel to the owner of the account in some cases.

== Examples ==
There are many different types of Twitter bots and their purposes vary from one to another. Some examples include:

- @Betelgeuse_3 sends at-replies in response to tweets that include the phrase, "Beetlejuice, beetlejuice, beetlejuice". The tweets are sent in the voice of the lead character from the Beetlejuice film.
- @CongressEdits and @parliamentedits posts whenever someone makes edits to Wikipedia from the United States Congress and United Kingdom Parliament IP addresses, respectively. @CongressEdits was suspended in 2018 while @parliamentedits is still running.
- @DBZNappa replied with "WHAT!? NINE THOUSAND?" to anyone on Twitter that used the internet meme phrase "over 9000." The account began in 2011, and was eventually suspended in 2015.
- @DearAssistant sends auto-reply tweets responding to complex queries in simple English by utilizing Wolfram Alpha.
- @DeepDrumpf is a recurrent neural network, created at MIT, that releases tweets imitating Donald Trump's speech patterns. It received its namesake from the term 'Donald Drumpf', popularized in the segment 'Donald Trump' from the show Last Week Tonight with John Oliver.
- @DroptheIBot tweets the message, "People aren't illegal. Try saying 'undocumented immigrant' or 'unauthorized immigrant' instead" to Twitter users who have sent a tweet containing the phrase "illegal immigrant". It was created by American Fusion.net journalists Jorge Rivas and Patrick Hogan.
- @everyword has tweeted every word of the English language. It started in 2007 and tweeted every thirty minutes until 2014.
- @nyt_first_said tweets every time The New York Times uses a word for the first time. It was created by artist and engineer Max Bittker in 2017. A similar bot was created for the NOS.
- @factbot1 was created by Eric Drass to illustrate what he believed to be a prevalent problem: that of people on the internet believing unsupported facts which accompany pictures.
- @fuckeveryword was tweeting every word in the English language preceded by "fuck", but Twitter suspended it midway through operation because the account tweeted "fuck niggers". @fckeveryword was created by someone else after the suspension to resurrect the task, which it completed in 2020.
- @Horse ebooks was a bot that gained a following among people who found its tweets poetic. It has inspired various _ebooks-suffixed Twitter bots which use Markov text generators (or similar techniques) to create new tweets by mashing up the tweets of their owner. It went inactive following a brief promotion for Bear Stearns Bravo.
- @infinite_scream tweets and auto-replies a 2–39 character scream. At least partially inspired by Edvard Munch's The Scream, it attracted attention from those distressed by the first presidency of Donald Trump and bad news.
- @MetaphorMagnet is an AI bot that generates metaphorical insights using its knowledge-base of stereotypical properties and norms. A companion bot @MetaphorMirror pairs these metaphors to news tweets. Another companion bot, @BestOfBotWorlds, uses metaphor to generate faux-religious insights.
- @Pentametron finds tweets incidentally written in iambic pentameter using the CMU Pronouncing Dictionary, pairs them into couplets using a rhyming dictionary, and retweets them as couplets into followers' feeds.
- @RedScareBot tweets in the persona of Joseph McCarthy in response to Twitter posts mentioning "socialist", "communist", or "communism".
- @tinycarebot promotes simple self care actions to its followers, such as remembering to look up from your screens, taking a break to go outside, and drink more water. It will also send a self care suggestion if you tweet directly at it.

== Prevalence ==
In 2009, based on a study by Sysomos, Twitter bots were estimated to create approximately 24% of tweets on Twitter. According to the company, there were 20 million, fewer than 5%, of accounts on Twitter that were fraudulent in 2013. In 2013, two Italian researchers calculated 10 percent of total accounts on Twitter were "bots" although other estimates have placed the figure even higher. One significant academic study in 2017 estimated that up to 15% of Twitter users were automated bot accounts. A 2020 estimate puts the figure at 15% of all accounts or around 48 million accounts.

A 2023 MIT study found that third-party tools used to detect bots may not be as accurate as they are trained on data being collected in simplistic ways, and each tweet in these training sets then manually labeled by people as a bot or a human. Already in 2019 German researchers scrutinized studies that were using Botswatch and Botometer, dismissing them as fundamentally flawed and concluded that (unlike spam accounts) there is no evidence that "social bots" even exist.

== Impact ==
The prevalence of Twitter bots coupled with the ability of some bots to give seemingly human responses has enabled these non-human accounts to garner widespread influence. The social implications these Twitter bots potentially have on human perception are sizeable. Looking at the Computers as Social Actors (CASA) paradigm, the journal notes, "people exhibit remarkable social reactions to computers and other media, treating them as if they were real people or real places." The study concluded that Twitter bots were viewed as credible and competent in communication and interaction making them suitable for transmitting information in the social media sphere. Whether posts are perceived to be generated by humans or bots depends on partisanship, a 2023 study found.

== See also ==
- Anti-spam techniques
- Devumi – Former social media company
- Rantic – Social media marketing website
- Spambot
