= Far-right usage of the internet =

Far-right political groups use the internet for communication, propaganda, and mobilization. The internet has facilitated new channels of communication that significantly impact the spread of news and the dynamics of political discourse. The interactive nature of social media allows far-right groups to reach wider and younger audiences, often using subtle messaging and popular social media tactics. Social media has become a crucial medium for how news and political information are consumed and shared, influencing public perception and civic engagement.

The first use of the internet by far-right groups was through the bulletin board system (BBS) in the mid-1980s, later moving to internet forums by the end of the 20th century.

Social media platforms such as Facebook, Instagram, TikTok, X (formerly Twitter) and YouTube are utilized. By leveraging viral trends, entertaining content, and direct interaction, far-right groups aim to spread their political messages, recruit followers, and foster a sense of community. Such activities are part of broader political processes and activities that involve the organization and spread of political values and ideologies. Far-right groups on platforms like TikTok engage with the youth through relatable and often non-political content to subtly promote their ideologies. This approach can affect political participation and election outcomes by shaping opinions and encouraging political involvement. Additionally, social media usage in political campaigns has become increasingly significant due to its communal and interactive nature, as users engage in discussions, share endorsements, and participate in collective actions such as voting encouragement.

== History ==
Since the early years of the internet, the far-right has utilized the computer networking for political goals. In March 1984, George P. Dietz, a white supremacist leader, used a bulletin board system (BBS) to create Liberty Bell Net. Dietz later helped Louis Beam establish his BBS, Aryan Nation Liberty Net, which spanned between Idaho, North Carolina and Texas. Tom Metzger also received assistance by Dietz to create the White Aryan Resistance bulletin. By the 2000s, internet forums became a popular networking method for the far-right. Into the 2020s, websites like 4chan, 8chan and Gab became popular with the far-right.

== Social media ==
Social media platforms are known for enabling anyone with an internet connection to create content and actively participate in political discourse. They enhance access to political information. However, many users primarily consume content passively, with content creation concentrated among a small group of active users. According to a Eurobarometer survey by the European Parliament, 79% of young Europeans aged 15 to 24 follow influencers or content creators on social media, highlighting the increasing use of these platforms for news consumption in this age group.

Far-right groups exploit technological affordances of social media platforms to maximize the reach and impact of their messages. They rely on replicability to share and alter content across different platforms, often decontextualizing messages to fit their narrative. Scalability is achieved through strategic use of algorithms and hashtags, allowing for broader audience engagement and visibility. Additionally, connectivity is enhanced by forming online communities that foster in-group solidarity and facilitate the spread of extremist ideologies, bypassing traditional media gatekeepers and leveraging direct communication with followers.

=== Facebook ===
Far-right groups have been exploiting Facebook's algorithmic tendencies to create ideological echo chambers, where conservatives and liberals largely consume different political news, leading to increased political polarization - although research is not totally clear on this point yet. Research has shown that changes to Facebook's algorithm significantly alter what users see and how they interact on the platform, with conservatives engaging more with political news and consuming more content flagged as untrustworthy or inaccurate. This asymmetry facilitates the spread of far-right misinformation, as politically aligned content is prioritized, encouraging conservative users to like, share, and comment more frequently on such posts. In addition to algorithmic manipulation, far-right militias and extremist groups have established strong presences on Facebook, using the platform to organize, recruit, and spread their ideology. They create private groups and pages that foster a sense of community and solidarity among members, often bypassing platform moderation policies. These groups frequently engage in activities designed to provoke conflict and gain visibility, such as trolling and viral stunts, and use Facebook's connectivity features to coordinate real-world actions and protests. Despite Meta's efforts to moderate content, far-right groups continue to leverage Facebook's features to maintain and grow their influence online.

=== Instagram ===
Far-right groups have adeptly utilized Instagram to recruit young followers and spread extremist ideologies. Instagram's visual nature and algorithmic design makes it susceptible to these activities. Far-right influencers often post aesthetically pleasing images interwoven with subtle far-right symbols and messages. For instance, women influencers play a key by blending personal lifestyle content with right-wing hashtags and symbols like the Black Sun, which have deeper ideological meanings to those aware of their significance. Instagram's algorithmic recommendations gradually expose users to more extremist content, fostering a sense of insider knowledge and belonging within far-right communities. This method creates filter bubbles and echo chambers where users repeatedly encounter content that reinforces their beliefs. For example, right-wing groups exploit hashtags such as #heimatverliebt (love of homeland) to attract followers and gently introduce them to extremist ideologies. Instagram's inadequate moderation has allowed groups like "The British Hand" and the "National Partisan Movement" to recruit young followers with minimal interference. These groups blend mainstream appeal with extremist ideology, using Instagram's visual and social engagement tools to build a community and propagate their messages. The platform's inadequate content moderation makes it particularly vulnerable to far-right exploitation, with extremists using visually engaging content and weakly enforced policies to spread their ideology.

Political entities, such as Germany's far-right party Alternative for Germany (AfD), have also used Instagram's ad features to promote divisive and hateful content. These ads often blame immigrants for societal issues, leveraging emotionally charged imagery, sometimes manipulated by AI, to incite fear and garner support. Despite Meta's policies against hate speech and divisive content, such ads have reached significant audiences, highlighting the challenges in moderating politically charged content on such a large platform. By manipulating platform algorithms and exploiting visual appeal, far-right groups on Instagram have effectively created a recruitment pipeline that subtly guides young users from mainstream content to extremist ideologies, operating in plain sight and often evading content moderation efforts.

=== TikTok ===
Far-right groups have increasingly used TikTok to spread their ideologies, recruit members, and influence political processes, especially targeting young voters. TikTok's user-friendly video tools and personalized content algorithms make it an effective platform for disseminating propaganda. These groups often disguise extremist messages as benign or humorous content, which lowers resistance among younger audiences. Investigations reveal that parties such as Germany's Alternative for Germany (AfD) and Romania's Alliance for the Union of Romanians (AUR) manipulate engagement metrics by purchasing fake followers and likes, enhancing the perceived popularity of their content. This tactic has significantly impacted youth votes in recent European elections. Additionally, the platform has been a conduit for spreading conspiracy theories and misinformation, aligning with pro-Russian narratives and extremist ideologies across various countries. Despite TikTok's assertions of robust policies against harmful content, the platform remains a significant vector for far-right activities.

=== Twitter ===
Under Elon Musk's leadership, Twitter has transformed significantly, particularly regarding its openness to far-right and extremist content. Musk, who purchased Twitter in 2022, has positioned himself as a champion of "free speech," subsequently scaling back the platform's moderation efforts. This shift has led to a noticeable increase in right-wing and extremist content, including antisemitism and misinformation. A notable instance reflecting Musk's influence on the platform was the announcement of Ron DeSantis’ 2024 presidential campaign via Twitter Spaces. This event underscored the platform's strategic pivot towards engaging conservative and far-right audiences. Musk's tenure has been characterized by several controversial decisions, such as reinstating accounts previously banned for spreading misinformation and extremist rhetoric. This leniency has fueled the proliferation of far-right content. Media Matters’ investigations have repeatedly highlighted the presence and impact of extremist content on X. A report from Media Matters revealed that advertisements from major corporations were appearing alongside posts with pro-Nazi and white supremacist content. This led to several large advertisers pulling their ads from the platform, emphasizing the ongoing challenge of content moderation. Following this report, Musk announced a lawsuit against Media Matters, arguing that the report exaggerated the prevalence of extremist content. Texas Attorney General Ken Paxton also launched an investigation into Media Matters, aligning with Musk's stance and further politicizing the issue. Overall, the changes under Musk's leadership have made X a more hospitable environment for far-right groups, amplifying their reach and influence in political and social spheres.

== YouTube ==
A 2017 New York Times Magazine article posited that YouTube had become "the new Conservative talk radio" for the far right. Research published in September 2018 by the Data & Society Research Institute reported that a collection of far-right political influencers use YouTube's recommendation engine—in concert with conventional brand-building techniques such as cross-marketing—to attract followers, and profit from monetization of engagements thus obtained. Though a 2019 New York Times article called the website "a godsend for hyper-partisans on all sides", the few progressive YouTube channels that flourished from 2012 to 2016 "were dwarfed by creators on the right". A Bellingcat analysis cited YouTube as the most frequent cause of "red-pilling" (converting to far-right beliefs), and a VOX-Pol analysis found that the 30,000 alt-right Twitter accounts linked to YouTube more often than to any other site. In The New York Times Kevin Roose described "countless" stories of "an aimless young man—usually white, frequently interested in video games—(who) visits YouTube looking for direction or distraction and is seduced by a community of far-right creators".

Research conducted by the Universidade Federal de Minas Gerais and École polytechnique fédérale de Lausanne and presented at the ACM Conference on Fairness, Accountability, and Transparency 2020 used information from the earlier Data & Society research and the Anti-Defamation League to categorize the levels of extremism of 360 YouTube channels and tracked users over 11 years by analysing 72 million comments, 2 million video recommendations, and 10,000 channel recommendations. The research found that users who engaged with less radical right-wing content tended over time to engage with more extremist content, which the researchers argued provides evidence for a "radicalization pipeline". According to a 2020 study published in The International Journal of Press/Politics, "An emerging journalistic consensus theorizes the central role played by the video 'recommendation engine,' but we believe that this is premature. Instead, we propose the 'Supply and Demand' framework for analyzing politics on YouTube." A 2021 study published in the Proceedings of the National Academy of Sciences found "no evidence that engagement with far-right content is caused by YouTube recommendations systematically, nor do we find clear evidence that anti-woke channels serve as a gateway to the far right. Rather, consumption of political content on YouTube appears to reflect individual preferences that extend across the web as a whole." A 2022 study published by the City University of New York found that "despite widespread concerns that YouTube's algorithms send people down 'rabbit holes' with recommendations to extremist videos, little systematic evidence exists to support this conjecture", "exposure to alternative and extremist channel videos on YouTube is heavily concentrated among a small group of people with high prior levels of gender and racial resentment.", and "contrary to the 'rabbit holes' narrative, non-subscribers are rarely recommended videos from alternative and extremist channels and seldom follow such recommendations when offered."

Given the tendency of YouTube's recommendation engine to suggest more radical videos (a tendency denied by YouTube officials), researcher Rebecca Lewis wrote that such networking "makes it easy for audience members to be incrementally exposed to, and come to trust, ever more extremist political positions". Ezra Klein wrote on Vox that "this is arguably the first time we’ve seen a distinctive ideological coalition emerging atop social media platforms and under the influence of social media algorithms". In accord, U.S. Senator Richard Blumenthal said that "YouTube is repeatedly used by malign actors... promoting very dangerous, disruptive narratives", adding that the website "tends to tolerate messaging and narratives that seem to be at the very, very extreme end of the political spectrum".

Almost a year before YouTube's January 2019 announcement that it would begin a "gradual change" of "reducing recommendations of borderline content and content that could misinform users in harmful ways", Zeynep Tufekci had written in The New York Times that, "(g)iven its billion or so users, YouTube may be one of the most powerful radicalizing instruments of the 21st century". For example, in Brazil—where YouTube is more widely watched than all but one TV channel—the website's recommendation engine was found to favor right-wing, conspiracy-filled channels including those of "a wave of right-wing YouTube stars (who) ran for office alongside (far-right president) Bolsonaro". Other videos increased a public perception that blames mosquito-borne Zika virus fever on vaccines or larvicides, inciting death threats against public health advocates.

Though viewership of far-right videos peaked in 2017—before YouTube's 2019 algorithm changes—through at least 2020 YouTube remained the only major social networking platform that was more popular among right-leaning users. In 2019–2020, mainstream conservatives fueled most growth in both video production and viewership.

Under YouTube's 2016-2019 changes to its recommendation engine, the most recommended channel evolved from conspiracy theorist Alex Jones to Fox News, especially Fox's "unabashedly conservative pundits". Fox News was said to fit into YouTube's "algorithmic sweet spots": being "rubber-stamped as an authoritative source" but having "partisan headline" videos. Leading up to the November 2020 U.S. presidential election, data showed the most frequently recommended Fox News videos were from "its pro-Trump prime-time shows that often attacked Democrats and sometimes spread unreliable information about voter fraud and the coronavirus". Following the 2020 election, "fringe, right-wing news channels aggressively pushing unfounded claims of widespread voter fraud" saw a greater percentage increase in views, while Fox News saw a decrease despite YouTube treating Fox as a "promoted, authoritative source". After the 2021 storming of the U.S. Capitol, YouTube took less aggressive action than other major social networking platforms toward Donald Trump, with CNBC noting that YouTube has historically taken a more hands-off approach to moderating content. Typically, YouTube has maintained a low profile as Facebook and Twitter took the brunt of backlashes in times of crisis, such as Russian interference in the 2016 elections and after the 2021 Capitol attack.

== Online streaming and influencers ==
Far-right influencers use strategies from influencer culture to spread reactionary messages and monetize their politics. They engage in viral stunts and create real-world commotion to gain online visibility, fostering a sense of shared intimacy with their followers. Additionally, they employ provocative tactics such as trolling and humor to build community and disguise hate speech, while also appearing authentic and relatable to maintain audience support. Far-right online streamers sometimes present themselves as being influencers focused on health and psychological wellness.

== By country ==
=== France ===
In France, the online presence of the far-right is known as the fachosphère, or "fascist-sphere". After National Front, now National Rally, was prevented from being disseminated in traditional French, their popularity on the internet grew after they created their website in 1996. Far-right internet users in France have demonstrated support for masculinity, misogyny and Islamophobia. Popular internet personalities that have been described as being part of the fachosphère include Alain Soral and Le Raptor.

== See also ==
- Algorithmic radicalization
- Alt-tech
