= Ghost followers =

Users on social media platforms who remain inactive

Ghost followers, also referred to as ghosts and ghost accounts or lurkers, are users on social media platforms who remain inactive or do not engage in activity. They register on platforms such as Twitter and Instagram. These users follow active members, but do not partake in liking, commenting, messaging, and posting. These accounts may be created by people or by social bots.

== Ghost follower scams ==
Many ghost followers are accounts created by scammers who create fictional profiles and use them to target and scam others.

Commercial services provide the ability to buy Instagram followers, most of which are ghosts. These individuals are paid to follow accounts but are not required to engage with them. This allows those seeking publicity to quickly increase their number of followers and appear to be popular, or "trending". For example, Rantic (formerly "SocialVEVO" and "Swenzy") was able to increase the number of Daily Dot's Twitter followers from 48,000 followers to 122,000 in only four days. This faux-popularity may still attract "volunteer" users. However, this technique may backfire if its use becomes known. According to Olivier Blanchard, unless the objective is just to appear popular, purchased ghosts do not help meet business objectives, other than possibly a form of brand marketing.

An article in the New York Times in 2014 featured an interview with an anonymous provider of ghost followers, who claimed that he had sold fake followers to celebrities and politicians. Another article in the NYT, from January 2018, discussed the economics of selling ghost followers on Twitter and other platforms.

The social media company Rantic has been identified as a provider of ghost followers, generating Instagram accounts via bots. The International Business Times reported in 2014 that Rantic was selling fake, bot generated followers and likes, in a manner violating Instagram's terms of service.

At the time, the practice of selling ghost followers was a multimillion-dollar online business.

== See also ==
- Asymmetric follow
- Crowds on Demand
- Egosurfing
- Ghosting (behavior)
- Influence-for-hire
- Rental family service
- Social bot
- Social spam
- Sock puppet account
