= NewsDiffs =

Archive website tracking changes to news articles

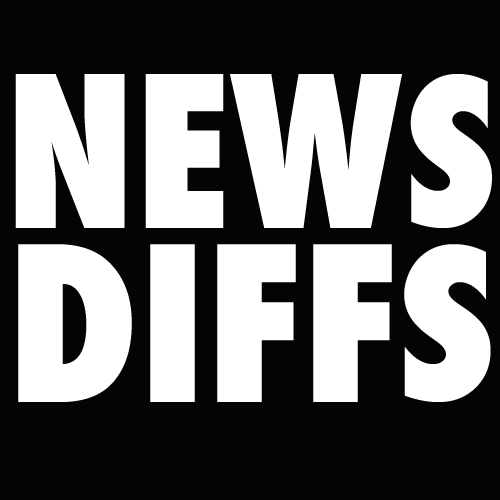
- NewsDiffs's logo
- Website type: Archive
- Available in: English
- Creators: Jennifer 8. Lee; Eric Price; Greg Price
- Website: www.newsdiffs.org
- Commercial: No
- Registration: No
- Launched: June 17, 2012; 14 years ago
- Current status: Online
- Content license: MIT License
- Written in: Python

NewsDiffs is a website that records changes to news organizations' websites. The website archives article revisions from The New York Times, CNN, Politico, The Washington Post, and the BBC.

It was created in June 2012 by former The New York Times journalist Jennifer 8. Lee, MIT graduate student Eric Price, and Tddium employee Greg Price. Written in the Python programming language, the source code is stored on GitHub. Reviewers praised the site for capturing changes during an era of fast news cycles but lamented the difficulty of finding substantial changes from the exhaustive stream of articles.

== History ==
NewsDiffs was created by former The New York Times journalist Jennifer 8. Lee; and two brothers who were programmers, MIT graduate student Eric Price and Tddium employee Greg Price. They built the website in 38 hours (including sleep) during the June 16–17, 2012, Knight-Mozilla-M.I.T. hackathon at the MIT Media Lab.

Lee said that in late 2011, she began thinking about how news articles' having several versions was problematic. Lee had seen a broadly publicized image showing The New York Times' evolving coverage of an Occupy Wall Street conflict on the Brooklyn Bridge between protesters and law enforcement officers. In an initial version, the article said the officers "allow[ed]" protesters to occupy the bridge, but a later version omitted this fact. Published 20 minutes later, the later version said that the protesters had moved onto the bridge without the police's consent. The revised version appeared to transfer the blame for the confrontation to the protesters, which sparked a significant controversy over how The New York Times reported the story. Lee separately observed that her articles for the paper would be revised for the late edition. She wondered, "I was always puzzled about what is the right way to maintain a historical record of the different versions that an article goes through, for just historical purposes."

The NewsDiffs creators wrote that the website was "inspired by the version control tracking used in computer programming", the diff utility, which allows viewers to compare a file's versions. NewsDiffs periodically scrapes The New York Times's front page, capturing all of the article links. It displays a list of articles with their revision histories. The versions are displayed next to each other, allowing viewers to see how the article's headline and text have been changed. The site archives The New York Times, CNN, Politico, The Washington Post, and the BBC.

NewsDiffs' source code, which is written in the Python programming language, is stored on GitHub in co-creator Eric Price's repository. It is open source. Versions of NewsDiffs have been written in Spain, Argentina, India, and Germany. In a 2013 article in the Columbia Journalism Review, Kira Goldenburg wrote that NewsDiffs was "a side passion project" stored on MIT's servers and modified during holiday weekends. In a 2015 Columbia Journalism Review article, Chava Gourarie wrote that Eric Price is continuing to do "maintenance work" on NewsDiffs "every few months".

It is archived by the Library of Congress. According to researchers John Fass and Angus Main, NewsDiffs frequently records an article's undergoing 20 revisions in a little more than half a day.

== Commentary ==
A brief exploration of NewsDiffs demonstrates that news outlets are routinely making changes after they publish, and not only copyediting changes. Most are fairly innocuous: sentence structure is changed, paragraphs are moved up or down, statements are added, quotes omitted, headlines are made more social media-friendly. But the potential for more substantive changes with a few keystrokes raises concerns about transparency.

— Chava Gourarie of Columbia Journalism Review on August 10, 2015

Craig Silverman of the Poynter Institute compared NewsDiffs to ProPublica's ChangeTracker, a tool that records revisions to the White House website and the Sunlight Foundation's Politwoops, a tool that displays tweets deleted by Twitter accounts owned by politicians. Ryan Graff wrote in PBS's Idea Lab that NewsDiffs is a website that "brought us greater transparency".

Lauren Rabaino, a homepage producer at The Seattle Times praised NewsDiffs in Adweek, writing that it "solves a fundamental problem with the minute-by-minute news cycle — changes are happening constantly and subtly with no form of documentation for those change". Arthur S. Brisbane, the public editor of The New York Times, wrote that around June 2011, "the newsroom's management told me that establishing a stronger historical record by tracking changes in articles and keeping them in a comprehensive archive was not a priority" and noted that with the creation of NewsDiffs in June 2012, "It's as if The Times is being turned inside out, its inner workings exposed for all to see — a kind of forced transparency."

Salon co-founder Scott Rosenberg said that NewsDiffs and similar tools can imply that journalists are concealing major revisions to their articles. Eric Price agreed, noting that many articles have a "gotcha tone", for example when authors discuss how The New York Times made a substantive revision without publishing a correction.

Researchers John Fass and Angus Main wrote in the journal Digital Journalism that a "limitation of Newsdiffs is that it contains no contextualising information". Brisbane wrote that "browsing the robo-stream of Times articles is labor intensive". Kira Goldenberg of the Columbia Journalism Review shared the same view, writing that, "there's no way to tell if tracked changes will be significant without browsing through the exhaustive list." She said that was a "shame" because when NewsDiffs stores "significant changes that aren't noted as corrections", The New York Times can be found failing to follow its own guidelines. She also wrote that the "site attracted coverage when it first went live, but it continues to serve as a unique source for media analysis in an era when journalists can revise copy with a click."
