= Influence-for-hire =

Economy of trading influence on social media

Influence-for-hire or collective influence, refers to the economy that has emerged around buying and selling influence on social media platforms.

== Overview ==
Companies that engage in the influence-for-hire industry range from content farms to high-end public relations agencies. Traditionally influence operations have largely been confined to public sector actors like intelligence agencies, in the influence-for-hire industry the groups conduction the operations are private with commerce being their primary consideration. However many of the clients in the influence-for-hire industry are countries or countries acting through proxies. They are often located in countries with less expensive digital labor.

== History ==
In May 2021, Facebook took a Ukrainian influence-for-hire network offline. Facebook attributed the network to organizations and consultants linked to Ukrainian politicians including Andriy Derkach.

During the COVID-19 pandemic state sponsored misinformation was spread through influence-for-hire networks.

In August 2021, a report published by the Australian Strategic Policy Institute implicated the Chinese government and the ruling Chinese Communist Party in campaigns of online manipulation conducted against Australia and Taiwan using influence-for-hire.

== See also ==
- Creator economy
- Cultural technology
- Hype (marketing)
- Influencer marketing
- Personal branding
- Reputation system
- Shill
- Social commerce
- Social media marketing
- Social profiling
- Viral marketing
