= Mobile ethnography =

Mobile ethnography is a qualitative research method that takes advantage of technology to document, analyze and derive implications of real-time customer experience. Therefore it’s often applied in the context of service design. Unlike classic ethnography where a researcher has to be present for observations, mobile ethnography uses the participant’s mobile device to gather user-centered information. It allows the participant to become an active researcher him- or herself, report experiences at the time of the happening, on the very spot and in the mental space of the experience and structure it themselves. Mobile ethnography therefore follows the principles of user-centered design.

== Characteristics ==
Other than classic ethnography, mobile ethnography overcomes the challenge of recalling experiences after the service usage by collecting data straight during the service delivery. As a form of auto-ethnography it takes place independently of geography and allows to gather real-time customer insights when and where they happen. As a self-structured approach participants themselves define on the touchpoints and therefore on what is essential for their customer experience. This also decreases research bias, as customers do not have to stick to predefined categories. As a research method, mobile ethnography is rather time- and cost-efficient as the participants become an active researcher by using his mobile device. Furthermore, research teams can be dispersed as the recruitment of participants can be done from any place and researchers do not have to be present during the data collection. However, participants should have a contact person in case questions appear.

== Application ==
Mobile ethnography methods differ in the mobile device they use, the openness of the approach, the frequency and the content assessed. Mobile ethnography has been applied in qualitative marketing research and customer experience management in order to slip into the customer’s shoes and let customers collect touchpoints in order to create their personal journey map.

The qualitative research method has been applied in various industries and fields. In tourism mobile ethnography has been applied to analyze the tourist and visitor experience. Also in the field of health care more and more studies apply mobile ethnography by monitoring the patients’ behaviour or progress in order to improve their quality of life and self-efficacy. Also in retail research, this method is applied to study the offline and online shopping experience. Newer approaches extend the scope and include the staff experience or even the learning experience of students. Mobile ethnography thus is not limited to customer experience. It can also be used as a method for investigating employee experience design or student experience.

Software nowadays provides various mobile ethnography tools in order to collect touchpoint by means of mobile devices and to allow digital journey mapping. Challenges for the researcher however include the correct briefing of participants and providing them an incentive for participants to report on their experiences.
