= Customer experience =

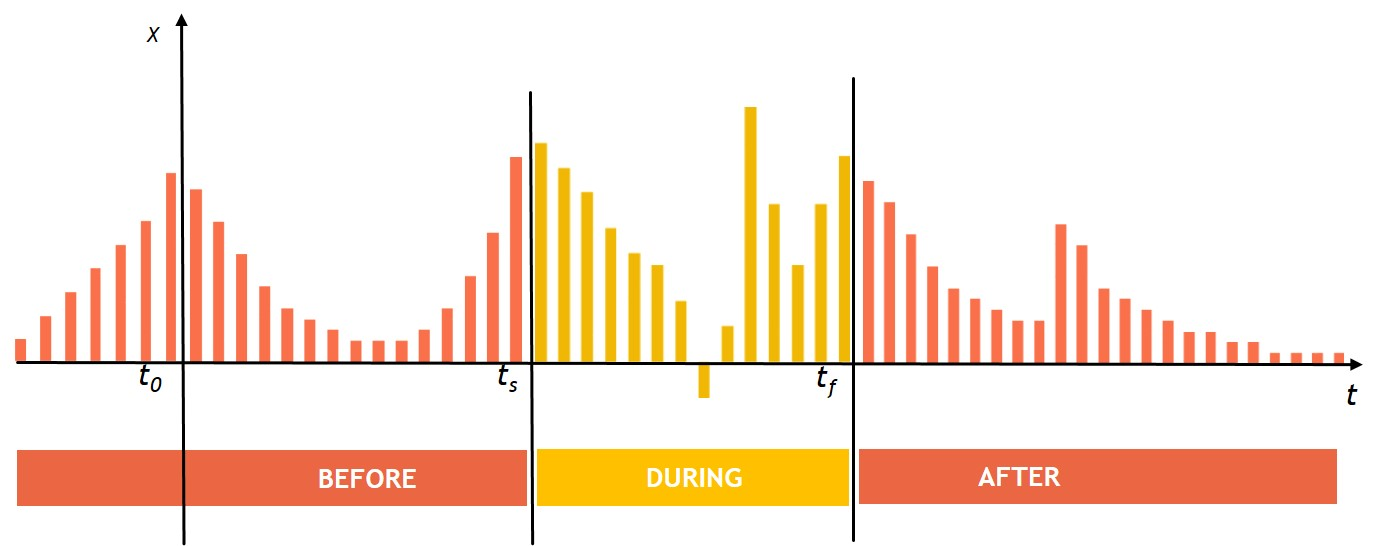
Customer experience before, during, and after the experience. The basic unit of customer experience can be described as the instant utility, which is influenced by sensory experiences, feelings, imaginations, and thoughts before, during, and after the experience.

Customer experience (CX) refers to the cognitive, emotional, sensory, and behavioral responses of a customer during all stages of interaction with a product or service, including pre-purchase, consumption, and post-purchase.

Different dimensions of customer experience include senses, emotions, feelings, perceptions, cognitive evaluations, involvement, memories, as well as spiritual components, and behavioral intentions. The pre-consumption anticipation experience can be described as the amount of pleasure or displeasure received from savoring future events, while the remembered experience is related to a recollection of memories about previous events and experiences of a product or service.

== Definitions ==
According to Forrester Research, the foundational elements of a remarkable customer experience consist of six key disciplines, beginning with strategy, customer understanding, design, measurement, governance and culture. A company's ability to deliver an experience that sets it apart in the eyes of its customers will increase the amount of consumer spending with the company and inspire loyalty to its brand. According to Jessica Sebor, "Loyalty is now driven primarily by a company's interaction with its customers and how well it delivers on their wants and needs".

Barbara E. Kahn, Wharton's Professor of Marketing, has established an evolutional approach to customer experience as the third of four stages of any company in terms of its customer centricity maturity. These progressive phases are:

1. Product orientation: Companies manufacture goods and offer them in the best way possible.
2. Market orientation: Some consideration of customer needs and segmentation arises, developing different marketing mix bundles for each one.
3. Customer experience: Adding to the other two factors some recognition of the importance of providing an emotionally positive experience to customers.
4. Authenticity: This is the most mature stage for companies. Products and services emerge from the real soul of the brand and connect naturally with clients and other stakeholders, for a long-term.

Customer experience involves every point of contact a business has with a customer, as well as interactions with its products or services. It has emerged as a vital strategy for retail businesses facing competition. According to Holbrook & Hirschman studies (1982) customer experience can be defined as a whole event that a customer comes into contact with when interacting with a certain business. This experience often affects the emotions of the customer. The whole experience occurs when the interaction takes place through the stimulation of goods and services consumed.

In 1994 Steve Haeckel and Lou Carbone further refined the original concept and collaborated on a seminal early article on experience management, titled "Engineering Customer Experiences", where they defined experience as "the 'take-away' impression formed by people's encounters with products, services and businesses — a perception produced when humans consolidate sensory information." They argued that the new approach must focus on total experience as the key customer value proposition.

The type of experience seen through a marketing perspective is put forward by Pine & Gilmore which they state that an experience can be unique which may mean different individuals will not have the same level of experience that may not be memorable to the person, therefore, it won't be remembered over a period of time. Certain types of experiences may involve different aspects of the individual person such as emotional, physical, intellectual or even spiritual.

Customer experience is the stimulation a company creates for the senses of the consumers, this means that the companies and that particular brand can control the stimuli that they have given to the consumer's senses which the companies can then control the consumers' reaction resulting from the stimulation process, giving more acquisition of the customer experience as expected by company.

Kotler et al. 2013, (p. 283) say that customer experience is about, "Adding value for customers buying products and services through customer participation and connection, by managing all aspects of the encounter". The encounter includes touchpoints. Businesses can create and modify touchpoints so that they are suited to their consumers which change/enhance the customers' experience. Creating an experience for the customer can lead to greater brand loyalty and brand recognition in the form of logos, colour, smell, touch, taste, etc.

However, customer experience management, and in particular design for experiences, is not only relevant for the private sector but also increasingly important in the public sector, especially in the age of digitalization where public service users cocreate value by integrating resources from multiple sources. In this context, organizations need to not only understand their service users but also the network of actors and how public services fit into the wider value constellation and people's activities.

== Designing customer experience ==
There are many elements in the shopping experience associated with a customer's experience. Customer service, a brand's ethical ideals and the shopping environment are examples of factors that affect a customer's experience. Understanding and effectively developing a positive customer experience has become a staple within businesses and brands to combat growing competition. Many consumers are well informed, they are able to easily compare two similar products or services together. Therefore, consumers are looking for experiences that can fulfil their intentions. A brand that can provide this gains a competitive advantage over its competition. A 2015 study found that developing a positive behavioural culture created a greater competitive advantage in the long term. It looked at the customer experience at resort hotels and discovered that providing the best hotel service was not sufficient. To optimise a customer's experience, management must also consider the peace of mind and relaxation, recognition and escapism, involvement, and hedonics. The overall customer experience must be considered. When the experience is non-routine, even prior expectations may be reconstructed as memories of the experience after some time has elapsed since the actual experience.

The development of a positive customer experience is important as it increases the chances of a customer to make continued purchases and develops brand loyalty. Brand loyalty can turn customers into advocates, resulting in a long-term relationship between both parties. This promotes word-of-mouth and turns the customer into a touchpoint for the brand. Potential customers can develop opinions through another's experiences. Males and females both respond differently to brands and therefore, will experience the same brand differently. Males respond effectively to relational, behavioural and cognitive experiences whereas females respond greater to behavioural, cognitive and effective experiences in relation to branded apps. If female consumers are the target market, an app advert focused on the emotion of the product will provide an effective customer experience.

Today, retail stores tend to exist in shopping areas such as malls or shopping districts. Very few operate in areas alone. Customer experience is not limited to the purchase alone. It includes all activities that may influence a customer's experience with a brand. Therefore, a shopping centre's reputation that a store is located in will affect a brand's customer experience. At the same time, it is important to provide a seamless integrated experience that goes beyond individual transactions and enhances overall brand perception. This is an example of the shopping environment affecting a customer's experience. A 2013 study found that a consumer's opinion of a town centre can affect the opinion of the retail stores operating within both negatively and positively. They shared an example of a town centre's management team developing synergy between the surrounding location and the retail stores. A location bound with historical richness could provide an opportunity for the town centre and local businesses to connect at a deeper level with their customers. They suggested that town centre management and retail outlets should work cooperatively to develop an effective customer experience. This will result in all stores benefiting from customer retention and loyalty.

Another effective way to develop a positive customer experience is by actively engaging a customer with an activity. Human and physical components of an experience are very important. Customers are able to recall active, hands-on experiences much more effectively and accurately than passive activities. This is because customers in these moments are per definition the 'experts of use'. Participants within a study were able to recount previous luxury driving experiences due to its high involvement. However, this can also have a negative effect on the customer's experience. Just as active, hands-on experiences can greatly develop value creation, they can also greatly facilitate value destruction. This is related to a customer's satisfaction with their experience. By understanding what causes satisfaction or dissatisfaction with a customer's experience, management can appropriately implement changes within their approach. A study on the customer experience in budget hotels revealed interesting results. Customer satisfaction was largely influenced by tangible and sensory dimensions. This included cleanliness, shower comfort, and room temperature, just to name a few. As budget hotels are cheap, customers expected the basic elements to be satisfactory and the luxury elements to be non-existent. If these dimensions did not reach an appropriate standard, satisfaction would decline, resulting in a negative experience.

== History ==
The concept of customer experience has roots in marketing and consumer behavior research. In 1994, Lewis Carbone and Stephen Haeckel published "Engineering Customer Experiences" in Marketing Management, coining the term and defining experience as "the 'take-away' impression formed by people's encounters with products, services and businesses."

In 1998, B. Joseph Pine II and James H. Gilmore published "Welcome to the Experience Economy" in the Harvard Business Review, arguing that businesses must orchestrate memorable events for customers and that the experience itself becomes the product. Their 1999 book The Experience Economy became a foundational text in the field.

In 1999, Bernd Schmitt of Columbia Business School published "Experiential Marketing" in the Journal of Marketing Management, introducing Strategic Experiential Modules (SEMs) covering sensory, affective, cognitive, physical, and relational dimensions of experience. Schmitt later published Customer Experience Management (2003), outlining a systematic framework for managing CX.

In 2011, Bruce Temkin and Jeanne Bliss co-founded the Customer Experience Professionals Association (CXPA), the first independent non-profit organisation dedicated to the advancement of customer experience as a professional discipline.

== Customer experience management ==
Customer experience management is the process that companies use to oversee and track all interactions with a customer during their relationship. This involves the strategy of building around the needs of individual customers. According to Jeananne Rae, companies are realizing that "building great consumer experiences is a complex enterprise, involving strategy, integration of technology, orchestrating business models, brand management and CEO commitment".

In 2020, the global CEM market was valued at $7.54 billion, and is expected to grow with a CAGR of 17.5% from 2021 to 2028. Top companies in the customer experience industry include:

- Adobe
- Clarabridge
- Medallia
- NetSuite
- Oracle
- Tech Mahindra
- Zendesk

According to Bernd Schmitt, "the term 'Customer Experience Management' represents the discipline, methodology and/or process used to comprehensively manage a customer's cross-channel exposure, interaction and transaction with a company, product, brand or service." Harvard Business Review blogger Adam Richardson says that a company must define and understand all dimensions of the customer experience in order to have long-term success: "Mapping out all the steps a customer takes while interacting with your company is a powerful way to improve the experience. Customer journey maps clarify what customers are trying to do, what barriers they face, and how they feel during each interaction with your product or service."

Although 80% of businesses state that they offer a "great customer experience," according to author James Allen, this contrasts with the 8% of customers expressing satisfaction with their experience. Allen asserts that for companies to meet the demands of providing an exceptional customer experience, they must be able to execute the "Three Ds":

1. designing the correct incentive for the correctly identified consumer, offered in an enticing environment
2. delivery: a company's ability to focus the entire team across various functions to deliver the proposed experience
3. development ultimately determines a company's success, with an emphasis on developing consistency in execution

CEM has been recognized as the future of the customer service and sales industry. Companies are using this approach to anticipate customer needs and adopt the mindset of the customer.

CEM depicts a business strategy designed to manage the customer experience and gives benefits to both retailers and customers. CEM can be monitored through surveys, targeted studies, observational studies, or "voice of customer" research. It captures the instant response of the customer to its encounters with the brand or company. Customer surveys, customer contact data, internal operations process and quality data, and employee input are all sources of "voice of customer" data that can be used to quantify the cost of inaction on customer experience issues.

The aim of CEM is to optimize the customer experience by gaining the loyalty of the current customers in a multi-channel environment and ensuring they are completely satisfied. Its also to create advocates of their current customers with potential customers as a word of mouth form of marketing. However, common efforts at improving CEM can have the opposite effect.

Utilizing surroundings includes using visuals, displays and interactivity to connect with customers and create an experience (Kotler, et al. 2013, p. 283). CEM can be related to customer journey mapping, a concept pioneered by Ron Zemke and Chip Bell. Customer journey mapping is a design tool used to track customers' movements through different touchpoints with the business in question. It maps out the first encounters people may have with the brand and shows the different routes people can take through the different channels or marketing (e.g. online, television, magazine, newspaper). Integrated marketing communications (IMC) is also being used to manage the customer experience; IMC is about sending a consistent message amongst all platforms; these platforms include: Advertising, personal selling, public relations, direct marketing, and sales promotion (Kotler et al. 2013, (p. 283), p. 495).

CEM holds great importance in terms of research and showing that academia is not as applicable and usable as the practice behind it. Typically, to make the best use of CEM and ensure its accuracy, the customer journey must be viewed from the actual perspective of customers, not the business or organization. It needs to be noted that there isn't a specific set of rules or steps to follow as companies (in their various industries) will have different strategies. Therefore, development into the conceptual and theoretical aspects is needed, based on customers' perspectives on the brand experience. This can be seen through different scholarly research. The reasoning behind the interest in CEM increasing so significantly is because businesses are looking for competitive differentiation. Businesses want to be more profitable and see this as a means to do so. Hence why businesses want to offer a better experience to their customers and want to manage this process efficiently. In order to gain success as a business customers need to be understood. In order to fully utilise the models used in practice, academic research that is conducted can assist the practical aspect. This along with recognising past customer experiences can help manage future experiences.

A good indicator of customer satisfaction is the Net Promoter Score. This indicates out of a score of ten if a customer would recommend a business to other people. With scores of nine and ten these people are called protractors and will recommend others to the given product but on the other end of the spectrum are detractors, those who give the score of zero to six. Subtracting the detractors from the protractors gives the calculation of advocacy. Those businesses with higher scores are likely to be more successful and give a better customer experience.

Not all aspects of CEM can be controlled by the business (e.g. other people and the influence they have). Besides, there is not much substantial information to support CEM claims in terms of academic research. The use of artificial intelligence in customer experience has slowly been increasing in recent years. Chatbots are often seen as the first phase of this development.

=== Communication management ===
The classical linear communication model includes having one sender or source sending out a message that goes through the media (television, magazines) and then to the receiver. The classical linear model is a form of mass marketing that targets a large number of people where only a few may be customers; this is a form of non-personal communication. The adjusted model shows the source sending a message either to the media or directly to an opinion leader/s and/or opinion former (Model, actress, credible source, trusted figure in society, YouTuber/reviewer), which sends a decoded message to the receiver. The adjusted model is a form of interpersonal communication where feedback is almost instantaneous with receiving the message. The adjusted model means that there are many more platforms of marketing with the use of social media, which connects people with more touchpoints. Marketers use the digital experience to enhance the customer experience. Enhancing digital experiences influences changes to the CEM, the customer journey map and IMC. The adjusted model allows marketers to communicate a message designed specifically for the 'followers' of the particular opinion leader or opinion former, sending a personalised message and creating a digital experience.

=== Persuasion techniques ===
Persuasion techniques are used when trying to send a message in order for an experience to take place. Marcom Projects (2007) came up with five mind shapers to show how humans view things. The five mind shapers of persuasion include:

1. Frames – only showing what they want you to see (a paid ad post)
2. Setting and context – the surrounding objects of items for sale
3. Filters – previous beliefs that shape thoughts after an interaction
4. Social influence – how behaviours of others impact us
5. Belief (placebo effect) – the expectation

Mind shapers can be seen through the use of the adjusted communication model, it allows the source/sender to create a perception for the receiver (Dahlen, Lange, & Smith, 2010, p. 39). Mind shapers can take two routes for persuasion:

1. Central route, this route requires a thought process to occur, the content of the message is important. People think thoroughly about their reaction/reply. This can be seen in the purchase of homes, Internet providers, insurance companies.
2. Peripheral route, does not require very much thought, the brain makes the connection. Marketers use recognisable cues like logos, colours and sounds. This type of marketing is used when the decision is about something simple like choosing a drink, food (Petty & Cacioppo, 1981).

Marketers can use human thought processes and target these to create greater experiences, they can do so by either making the process more simple and creating interactive steps to help the process (Campbell & Kirmani, 2000).

== Customer relationship management ==
According to Das (2007), customer relationship management (CRM) is the "establishment, development, maintenance and optimization of long-term mutually valuable relationships between consumers and organizations". The official definition of CRM by the Customer Relationship Management Research Center is "a strategy used to learn more about the customers' needs and behaviours in order to develop stronger relationships with them". The purpose of this strategy is to change the approach to customers and improve the experience for the consumer by making the supplier more aware of their buying habits and frequencies.

The D4 Company Analysis is an audit tool that considers the four aspects of strategy, people, technology and processes in the design of a CRM strategy. The analysis includes four main steps.

1. "Define the existing customer relationship management processes within the company.
2. Determine the perceptions of how the company manages its customer relationships, both internally and externally.
3. Design the ideal customer relationship management solutions relative to the company or industry.
4. Deliver a strategy for the implementation of the recommendations based on the findings".

== User experience ==
In the classical marketing model, marketing is deemed to be a funnel: at the beginning of the process (in the "awareness" stage) there are many branches competing for the attention of the customer, and this number is reduced through the different purchasing stages. Marketing is an action of "pushing" the brand through a few touchpoints (for example through TV ads).

Since the rise of the World Wide Web and smartphone applications, there are many more touchpoints from new content serving platforms (Facebook, Instagram, Twitter, YouTube etc.), individual online presences (such as websites, forums, blogs, etc.) and dedicated smartphone applications.

As a result, this process has become a type of "journey":

1. The number of brands does not decrease during the process of evaluating and purchasing a product.
2. Brands not taken into account in the "awareness" stage may be added during the evaluation or even purchase stage
3. Following the post-purchase stage, there is a return to the first step in the process, thus feeding the brand awareness.

Customer sales channels have increasingly multichannel in nature. The growth and importance of social media and digital technologies, has made it important for businesses to understand to understand these dynamics within the context of customer journeys. Platforms such as Facebook, Instagram and X (Formerly Twitter) generate continuous streams of data that can be analyzed to better understand consumer behavior. In this environment, business flexibility and responsiveness are often considered important, as customers maintain ongoing digital interactions with companies and their products. Access to digital information has enabled consumers to form independent evaluations regarding how and where to engage with products and services. Businesses may use insights into customer preferences and behavior to inform strategies aimed at improving engagement and achieving a competitive advantage.

Due to the shift in customer experience, in 2014 Wolny & Charoensuksai highlight three behaviours that show how decisions can be made in this digital journey. The Zero Moment of truth is the first interaction a customer has in connection with a service or product. This moment affects the consumer's choice to explore a product further or not at all. These moments can occur on any digital device. Showrooming highlights how a consumer will view a product in a physical store but then decide to exit the store empty handed and buy online instead. This consumer decision may be due to the ability to compare multiple prices online. On the opposing end of the spectrum is webrooming. Consumers will research a product online in regards to quality and price but then decide to purchase in store. These three channels need to be understood by businesses because customers expect businesses to be readily available to cater to their specific customer needs and purchasing behaviours.

== Customer journey ==
In marketing, the notion of customer journey portrays the process customers go through to establish a commercial relationship with a firm. The journey emphasizes touchpoints, which are the moments in which firms can interact with their current or potential customers. Managers use visualizations called customer journey mapping (CJM) to represent the sequences of interactions between firms and customers to identify opportunities for interaction. Understanding CJM also allows for corporations to reduce "friction", or potential issues for the customer.

CJM has subsequently become one of the most widely used tools for service design and has been utilized as a tool for visualizing intangible services. A customer journey map shows the story of the customer's experience. It not only identifies key interactions that the customer has with the organization, but it also brings the user's feelings, motivations, and questions for each of the touchpoints. Finally, a customer journey map has the objective of teaching organizations more about their customers. To map a customer journey is important to consider the company's customers (buyer persona), the customer journey's time frame, channels (telephone, email, in-app messages, social media, forums, recommendations), first actions (problem acknowledgment), and last actions (recommendations or subscription renewal). Customer Journey Maps are good storytelling conduits – they communicate to the brand the journey, along with the emotional quotient, that the customer experiences at every stage of the buyer journey.

Even in the case of a non-repeated service experience, it is important to consider not only the experience itself, but also the stages before and after the experience. The pre-experience stage can further be divided into pre-decision and post-decision phases. Accordingly, the entire process may be conceptualized as the “4 Es”: Exploration (before decision-making), Expectation (after decision-making but before the experience), Experience (during service use), and Evaluation (after the experience).

Customer journey maps take into account people's mental models (how things should behave), the flow of interactions, and possible touchpoints. They may combine user profiles, scenarios, and user flows; and reflect the thought patterns, processes, considerations, paths, and experiences that people go through in their daily lives.

=== Benefits ===
Mapping the customer journey helps organizations understand how prospects and customers use the various channels and [touchpoints], how the organization is perceived, and how the organization would like its customers and prospects' experiences to be. By understanding the latter, it is possible to design an optimal experience that meets the expectations of major customer groups, achieves competitive advantage, and supports the attainment of desired customer experience objectives. Increased customer retention is another benefit of a carefully designed and executed customer experience strategy.

Journey mapping or journey orchestration has recently benefitted from the growth of AI technology. Solutions have become available in the last decade which allow AI to enhance complex customer journeys. Until recently, all customer journey mapping was human-led, but we are currently experiencing a rise of artificial intelligence in customer experience.

== Sales experience ==
Retail environment factors include social features, design, and ambiance. This can result in enhanced pleasure while shopping, thus a positive customer experience and more likely chances of the customer revisiting the store in the future. The same retail environment may produce varied outcomes and emotions, depending on what the consumer is looking for. For example, a crowded retail environment may be exciting for a consumer seeking entertainment, but create an impression of inattentive customer service and frustration to a consumer who may need help looking for a specific product to meet an immediate need.

Environmental stimuli such as lighting and music can influence a consumer's decision to stay longer in the store, therefore increasing the chances of purchasing. For example, a retail store may have dim lights and soothing music which may lead a consumer to experience the store as relaxing and calming.

Today's consumers are consistently connected through the development of technological innovation in the retail environment. This has led to the increased use of digital-led experiences in their purchase journey both in-store and online that inspire and influence the sales process. For example, Rebecca Minkoff has installed smart mirrors in their fitting rooms that allow the customers to browse for products that may complement what they are trying on. These mirrors also hold an extra feature, a self-checkout system where the customer places the item on an RFID-powered table, which then sends the products to an iPad that is used to check out.

External and internal variables in a retail environment can also affect a consumer's decision to visit the store. External variables include window displays such as posters and signage, or product exposure that can be seen by the consumer from outside of the store. Internal variables include flooring, decoration and design. These attributes of a retail environment can either encourage or discourage a consumer from approaching the store.

The sales experience is a subset of the customer experience. Whereas customer experience encompasses the sum of all interactions between an organization and a customer over the entire relationship, the sales experience focuses exclusively on interactions that take place during the sales process, up to the point when a customer decides to buy.

The sales experience concerns the buyer's journey up to and including the point at which the buyer makes a purchase decision. Sales is a very important touchpoint in the overall customer experience, as this is where the most human interaction takes place.

Customer experience tends to be owned by the marketing function within an organization, and therefore has little control or focus on what happens before a customer decides to buy.

Industry research shows that many organizations assign CX accountability to the Chief Marketing Officer or marketing leadership, reflecting marketing's historical responsibility for brand, messaging, and lifecycle communications. As a result, CX strategy is often designed and measured by marketing teams even though execution spans multiple departments, including sales, product, and customer support.

This structure creates a common gap in the pre-purchase experience. While marketing may be responsible for CX outcomes, it typically has limited direct control over key pre-purchase interactions, such as sales conversations, product trials, or technical evaluations, which are owned by other functions. Research on customer journeys shows that customers perceive these stages as part of a single, continuous experience, even when organizations manage them through separate teams and systems.

When ownership is fragmented, pre-purchase stages are especially vulnerable to inconsistencies, including mismatched messaging, unclear expectations, and friction during handoffs between marketing and sales. In digital and SaaS contexts, this gap is often addressed by extending customer-experience practices earlier in the journey through self-serve education, contextual guidance, and unified messaging that spans both pre- and post-purchase phases.

== Measurement ==
Several standardised metrics are widely used to quantify customer experience:

- Net Promoter Score (NPS) — introduced by Fred Reichheld in a 2003 Harvard Business Review article, NPS measures the likelihood of a customer recommending a company on a 0–10 scale. Respondents are classified as Promoters (9–10), Passives (7–8), or Detractors (0–6), and the score is the percentage of Promoters minus the percentage of Detractors.
- Customer Satisfaction Score (CSAT) — measures satisfaction with a specific interaction or transaction, typically on a 1–5 or 1–10 scale.
- Customer Effort Score (CES) — introduced by Matthew Dixon, Karen Freeman, and Nicholas Toman in a 2010 Harvard Business Review article based on a study of 75,000 customer interactions, CES measures the ease of a customer's experience. The study found that reducing customer effort was a stronger predictor of loyalty than increasing satisfaction.
- Customer lifetime value (CLV) — estimates the total revenue a business can expect from a single customer over the duration of the relationship.

The Forrester CX Index, an annual benchmark evaluating the quality of customer experience across hundreds of brands and multiple industries, has found that companies with superior CX performance significantly outperform laggards in revenue growth.

== Role of artificial intelligence ==
Artificial intelligence has become central to customer experience management. Applications include chatbots and conversational AI for automated customer service, sentiment analysis for understanding customer emotions, predictive analytics for anticipating customer needs, and personalisation of content and recommendations using machine learning.

A 2026 Gartner survey found that 91% of customer service leaders reported direct pressure from executives to implement AI, and predicted that agentic AI would autonomously resolve 80% of common customer service issues without human intervention by 2029. However, the 2025 Forrester CX Index reported that global customer experience quality had fallen to an all-time low, attributed in part to disappointing technology implementations, prompting debate about the balance between AI-driven efficiency and human-centred service.

== Market size ==
The global customer experience management market was valued at approximately US$15.6 billion in 2025 and is projected to reach US$47.7 billion by 2033, growing at a compound annual growth rate of 15.2%, according to Grand View Research. North America accounted for 42.4% of the market revenue in 2025, and cloud-based deployment represented 77% of industry revenue.

== See also ==
- Consumer behavior
- Experience economy
- Experience model
- User experience
