= Showroom (disambiguation) =

A showroom is a large space used to display products or show entertainment.

Showroom may also refer to:

- The Showroom, not-for-profit art gallery in London
- Showrooming, practice of examining merchandise in a physical store then buying it online
- Showroom (streaming service), Japanese live streaming platform
- Showroom Cinema, Sheffield, cinema in Sheffield, England
