= Amazon Effect =

Effect of e-commerce on the retail industry

Amazon's logo for its American entity

The disruptive effect of e-commerce on the global retail industry has been referred to as the Amazon Effect: the term refers to Amazon.com's dominant role in the e-commerce market place and its leading role in driving the disruptive impact on the retail market and its supply chain.

The effect has been heavily researched by numerous studies, including an in-depth Harvard Business School study by Alberto Cavallo. The Amazon Effect has been found to cause numerous changes in the retail market. Among these impacts is an increase in price flexibility and uniform pricing in traditional brick-and-mortar stores. An externality of the increasing price flexibility and uniform pricing has been a decrease in pass-through inflation. Various other studies have revealed that the Amazon Effect has forced retail malls and offline retailers to create an experience around offline shopping in order to pull business away from eCommerce. Finally, it has been discovered that eCommerce has pushed retailers to increase their incorporation of technology to make offline shopping more convenient and faster.

== Price flexibility ==
Price flexibility can be defined as adjustable prices that can change easily based on negotiation between buyers and sellers and changes in demand and supply. With the rise of e-commerce, prices have become more flexible because of the ability to electronically change prices in an instant. This has taken out the need for face-to-face negotiations and replaced it with electronic competition to attract the most buyers. As a result of the internet making flexible pricing more attainable and desirable, it has changed how demand and supply play out within the marketplace. Walmart and Amazon exemplify this as it has been shown that products that are both easily found and sold online at both Walmart and Amazon have twenty percent shorter price duration than those just found online at Walmart. Since prices adjust easier to changes in supply and demand both produces and consumers benefit. Consumers benefit from lower prices and producers benefit from an increase in sales especially firms with elastic demand. Not all products are affect the same though as products in categories such as recreation and electronics that possess a greater online market share have prices that are less stable over time. The opposite is true for products like alcohol who possess a smaller online market share and more stable prices.

=== Effects on consumers ===
A marketplace with price flexibility allows consumers to find prices that best fit the value they receive from the product or service. Perishable goods such as airline seats, hotel rooms, and phone plans are the best example of this, as customers can adjust their price based on what they see value in. When consumers are able to find products that are priced to fit their utility for that product, overall demand goes up. Price transparency also encourages the practice of showrooming. Showrooming is when a customer views a product within a brick and mortar store, then buys it online in order to prevent overpaying for a product.

More generally, the Amazon effect seems to have generated substantial change in consumers’ expectations towards both offline and online retailers, especially regarding effectiveness of customer service, online purchasing experience, and fast delivery times

=== Effects on producers ===
Producers are being forced to make their prices more flexible due to Amazon's ability to rapidly change prices to fit demand with little costs. This allows Amazon to price more competitively and maximize demand. Amazon's competitive prices have trickled into other markets as 80% of consumers now check online prices and compare them to the ones in store. As a result, firms are forced to lower their prices in order to stay competitive and not lose demand for their products. Firms operating at lower margins are also more sensitive to supply shocks, creating an environment of unstable prices. In a market where price flexibility is common, producers have the ability to price discriminate. When a producer practices pricing discrimination, they are able to capture consumer surplus through various practices. One of the common practices used is quantity discounts. For example, goods in a market are often sold at a lower price per unit when buying in bulk. Since consumers will buy in different quantities, companies are able to capture the different prices people are willing to spend for said good. Another strategy is offering different groups different prices for the same good or service. This can be seen when children and seniors get discounts at theme parks or on public transportation.

=== Effects on competitors ===
McBeath notes the importance of differentiation as a business strategy adopted by competitor businesses.

== Uniform pricing ==
Uniform pricing is when a company charges a universal price for its goods or service regardless of its location. An example, of this is when the price of an item of food costs the same at every branch of Walmart. In the study, it is hypothesized that uniform pricing arises as a result of the openness and transparency of the internet. Huge public outcry could result from consumers realizing that they are paying more for the same product than someone else. With Amazon's transparent prices it is more difficult for them to price discriminate without anyone noticing. For example, a study found that when retailers open online fronts to compete in the online marketplace, their prices become transparent to all consumers, making the retailer more accountable if it chooses to price discriminate. This pushes retailers toward uniform pricing. In the short run, producers suffer from these strategies that reduce price discrimination and bring about uniform pricing. As a result, companies can also be more sensitive to aggregate shocks when prices are uniform.

== Inflation and pass-through ==
Cavallo suggests that the Amazon effect could have had a profound role in the inflation dynamics as a result of the increase in price flexibility and uniform pricing. A British study backs this as it was found that during times when prices were very flexible, the Bank of England would overestimate the impact of inflationary shocks. When prices are allowed to float, it results in faster market clearing. So while prices may be hit hard initially by an aggregate shock, they will adjust back down to market equilibrium quicker. When prices adjust back down to equilibrium overall inflation will go down as a result of a decrease in prices. Another factor in domestic inflation is a term called exchange rate pass-through. Exchange rate pass-through is any effect exchange rates have on domestic inflation. By looking back at the two categories, electronics (high online market share) and food and beverages (low online market share), the effect on inflation can be seen. While the results showed a relative pass-through of 83% for electronics, it only showed a 38% for food and beverages. Therefore, it is concluded that prices with a higher online presence tend to be more sensitive to fluctuations in exchange-rate. As a result, products are more efficiently pricing causing a reduction in inflation over time.

== Shopping as an experience ==
As brick and mortar stores attempt to compete with the growing presence of online retail, they have focused on the in-store experience in order to draw customers to their businesses. One example of this is a mall in Minnesota that features an aquarium and a dinosaur walk museum. Another is the Irvine Spectrum, which features a grassy area where customers can sit down, a Ferris wheel, a playground for kids, an ice rink in winter, and a train for families to take around the mall. Retailers such as Lolli and Pops have also optimized their store layouts, using software as online retailers use analytics to find the optimal layout of the facility to boost sales. Some companies have also tried to complement their online website with an in-store experience such as Nordstrom Local. Nordstrom Local allows customers to order online then pick up in a store where an array of refreshments are served to them. A final strategy that brick-and-mortar retailers are using are showrooms and testing areas. For example, Living Spaces has sample bedrooms set up in its stores.

== Friction-less shopping as a result of technology ==
Numerous retailers have incorporated technology to compete with Amazon's fast pace and smooth shopping experience. Both Amazon and Walmart have grocery delivery services, which has created a rivalry between the companies as they both push to extend their grocery lines to more regions and streamline their services. HP has also introduced its competing "Instant Ink" service. The service allows its customers to click a button when they are running low on ink, and HP will automatically send the company more ink. This service is in direct competition with Amazon Dash buttons, which order a product whenever the button is pushed. While offline retailers push more online content to compete with eCommerce, Amazon is pushing into the brick-and-mortar market. Amazon Go is one way Amazon is attempting to directly with offline retailers. Amazon Go allows a customer to scan their phone app when they walk in, grab their groceries, and then leave. This allows customers to move at their own pace, quickly get in and out the store, and make more impulse purchases
