= Experience management =

Effort by organizations to measure and improve the experiences they provide

Experience management is an effort by organizations to measure and improve the experiences they provide to customers as well as stakeholders like vendors, suppliers, employees, and shareholders. The concept posits that experiences comprise distinct economic offerings that create economic value and competitive advantage.

Organizations have begun to collect experience data in addition to operational data, since experiences are seen as a competitive advantage. Experience management platforms provide various services to automate the process of identifying and improving experiences across an organization.

Broader than customer experience management, experience management now encompasses customer experience along with other areas, such as brand experience, employee experience and product experience, which are all seen as interrelated.

== History ==
In 1994 Steve Haeckel and Lou Carbone collaborated on a seminal early article on experience management, titled "Engineering Customer Experiences", where they defined experience as "the 'takeaway' impression formed by people's encounters with products, services and businesses – a perception produced when humans consolidate sensory information." They argued that the new approach must focus on total experience as the key customer value proposition.

The concept reached a wide audience in 1999, when it was popularized by B. Joseph Pine II and James H. Gilmore in their book Experience Economy. In the same year, Bernd Schmitt published Experiential Marketing: How to Get Customers to Sense, Feel, Think, Act, and Relate to Your Company and Brands.

In the 2000s, experience management emerged as a complex field unifying the experiences of brands, employees, products and more. It was acknowledged that generating new experiences for end customers requires designing better experiences for internal players of an organization. Value is created by focusing on the experiences of everyone involved in or affected by a new offer, such as customers, employees, suppliers, and other stakeholders.

Experience management is often uses agreements in the form of an Experience Level Agreement (XLA), similar to a Service Level Agreement (SLA), where targets for stakeholder experience are agreed and contractually managed.

== Management ==
To create and manage the experiences, businesses must evaluate, implement, integrate, and build experiences from a fragmented landscape. Such needs are met by experience management platforms, by companies such as Unisys, which help automate the process of measuring and improving experiences across an organization by coordinating content, customer data and core services, and unifying marketing, commerce and service processes.

Experience management platforms compare multiple layers of data and statistics to enable organizations to identify any experience gaps. They connect operational databases with human feedback, analyzing respondents' emotions, beliefs, and sentiments for a holistic view of the experiences they provide. Their methods include artificial intelligence, predictive analytics, and statistical models.

== Other uses ==
While the term experience management is predominantly used in business, it has another meaning. It is used for a special kind of knowledge management that deals with collecting, modeling, storing, reusing, evaluating, and maintaining experience. In that sense, the term is interchangeable with expertise management.

== See also ==
- Stakeholder management
