= EED =

EED may refer to:

- Polycomb protein EED, encoded by the EED gene
- EED, Inc., an American consulting firm
- Employee experience design
- Empty envelope deposit
- Environmental enteric dysfunction, or environmental enteropathy, an intestinal disorder
- EU Energy Efficiency Directive 2012
- European Endowment for Democracy
- Needles Airport (IATA airport code), California, U.S.
