= Experience economy =

Sale of experiences to customers

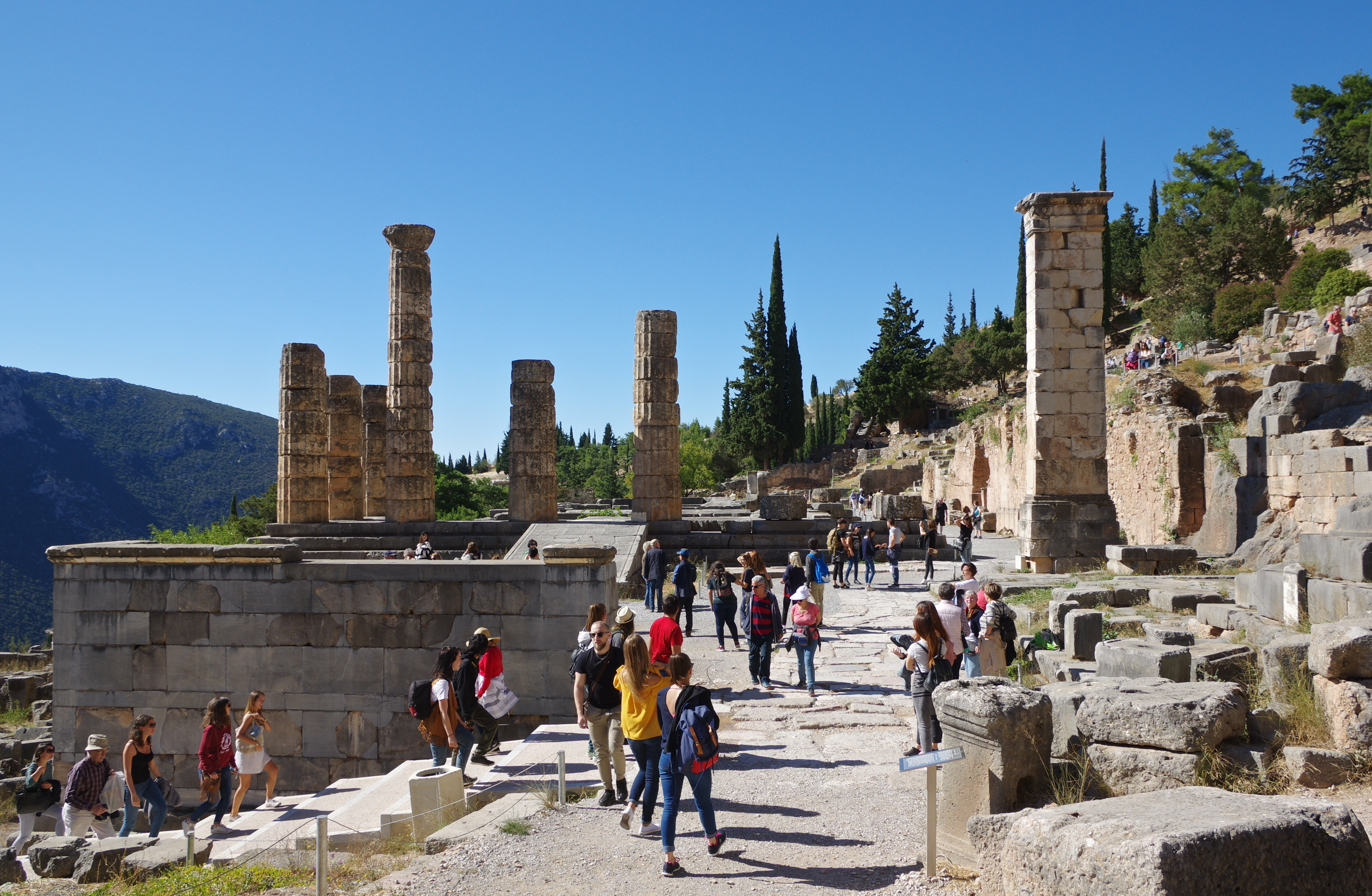
Tourists having the purchased experience of visiting the Temple of Apollo at Delphi

An experience economy is the sale of memorable experiences to customers. The term was first used in a 1998 article by B. Joseph Pine II and James H. Gilmore describing the next economy following the agrarian economy, the industrial economy, and the most recent service economy.

== Business theory ==
Joseph Pine II and James H. Gilmore argue that businesses must orchestrate memorable events for their customers, and that memory itself becomes the product: the "experience". More advanced experience businesses can begin charging for the value of the "transformation" that an experience offers, e.g. as education offerings might do if they were able to participate in the value that is created by the educated individual. This, they argue, is a natural progression in the value added by the business over and above its inputs.

Although the concept of the experience economy was initially focused on business, observations and theories have crossed into tourism, and architecture. The experience economy can be quantified as the economic value of an experience, which is a psychological process people can go through. The experience economy is often consumed as product or service, or as pure experience product such as sports, and online dating.

The experience economy is also considered the main underpinning for customer experience management.

== History ==
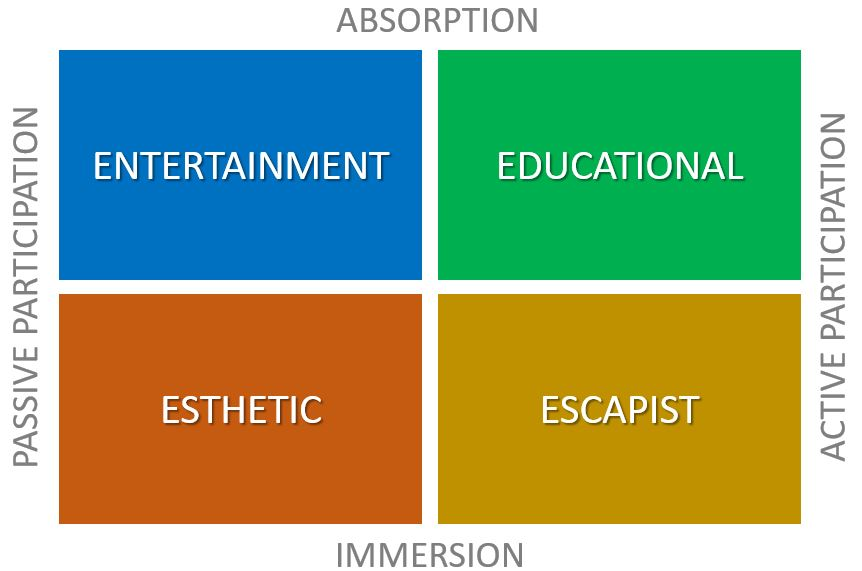
Four realms of customer experience (Pine & Gilmore, 1999)

This kind of behavior in a society has been observed and analysed much earlier by various authors and researchers. A good example can be found in the pioneering book of futurists Alvin and Heidi Toffler, Future Shock, first published in 1970, which Pine and Gilmore quote in their work. The Tofflers discuss rapid change in American society and explore ways for humans to adapt. In Chapter 10, The Experience Makers, they say that an economy is being created geared to the provision of psychic gratification, that a process of "psychologization" finds place and humans will strive for a better "quality of life". Manufacturers of goods will add a "psychic load" to basic products, the psychic component of services will expand and we will witness the rise of experience industries whose sole output consists of pre-programmed experiences, including simulated environments that offer customers a taste of adventure, danger, or other pleasure.

In the early 1980s, consumer behavior researchers had begun to question the hegemony of the information processing perspective on the ground that it may neglect important consumption phenomena like daydreams and emotional responses. Morris Holbrook and Elizabeth Hirschman argue in their paper "The Experiential Aspects of Consumption: Consumer Fantasies, Feelings, and Fun" for the recognition of experiential aspects of consumption.

In 1992, German sociologist Gerhard Schulze researched inhabitants of the city of Nürnberg and did observe a new way of living where basic needs were covered and people merely were striving for a "nice living ("schönes Leben"), experiencing life ("er-leben"). Schulze summarised his findings using the words "Experience Society" in his book Die Erlebnisgesellschaft, translated into English as "The Experience Society" in 1995. In the experience society people behave differently as consumers. A transformation finds place from the need for goods that are generally useful or functional, to a need for goods that deliver an individual experience. Demand and offerings for these experiences meet at the "Experience Market" ("Erlebnismarkt").

In 1996, Danish researcher Rolf Jensen of the Copenhagen Institute for Futures Studies writes in his article The Dream Society for The Futurist that American society is yielding to a society focused on dreams, adventure, spirituality, and feelings where the story that shapes feelings about a product will become a large part of what people buy when they buy the product. Jensen framed this trend as the commercialization of emotions. "In 25 years, what people buy will be mostly stories, legends, emotion, and lifestyle."

== Stages of marketing a good or service ==
A core argument is that because of technology, increasing competition, and the increasing expectations of consumers, services today are starting to look like standardized goods. Products can be placed on a continuum from undifferentiated (referred to as commodities) to highly differentiated. Just as service markets build on goods markets, so transformation and experience markets build on these newly commoditized services, e.g. Internet bandwidth, consulting help.

The classification for each stage in the evolution of products is:

- A commodity business charges for undifferentiated products.
- A goods business charges for distinctive, tangible things.
- A service business charges for the activities you perform.
- An experience business charges for the feeling customers get by engaging it.
- A transformation business charges for the benefit customers (or "guests") receive by spending time there.

Proceeding to the next stage more or less requires giving away products at the more commodified level. For instance, to charge for a service such as new car warranties, one must be prepared to give away new cars to replace "lemons". And to charge for transformations, one must be prepared to risk not being paid for the time one spends working with customers who do not "transform".

Pine and Gilmore draw on Walt Disney, AOL, Nordstrom, Starbucks, Saturn, Kanye West, IBM and many others as examples.

== Criticisms ==
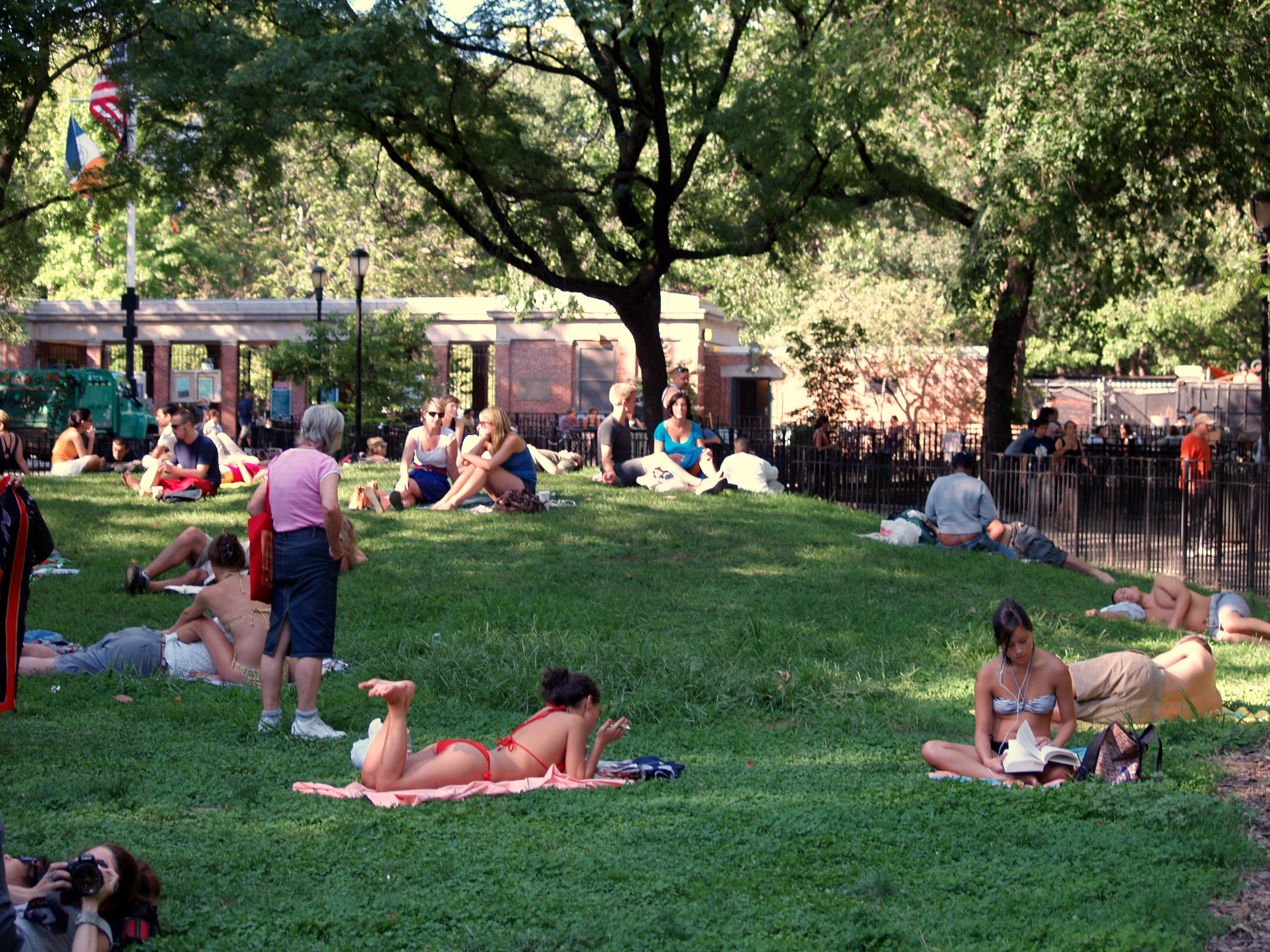
Public parks were initially set aside for leisure, recreation and sport.

Pine and Gilmore's thesis has been criticized as an example of an overhyped business philosophy that emerged from the dot-com bubble during a period in which a rising U.S. economy was tolerant of high prices and inflated claims and imposed no limitations of supply or investment. Detractors contrast it with other service-economy theses, such as that laid out in Natural Capitalism, which places a clear focus on making measurably better use of scarce resources, usually considered to be the basis of economics. They claim that service management should stress efficiency over effectiveness.

The thesis has also been criticized from within the fields of tourism, leisure, and hospitality management studies, wherein well-established theories on the role of experiences in the economy went unacknowledged by Pine and Gilmore. Although continuing to influence business thinking, the Experience Economy has been superseded within the service marketing and management literature, whereby the economic value of all goods and business services is co-created or co-produced through the interaction between consumers and producers.

== See also ==
- Commodification
- E-commerce
- Experience management
- Generation Z
- Retail apocalypse
