= Research online, purchase offline =

Shopping practice

Research online, purchase offline (ROPO) (also known as online-to-store, reverse showrooming, or webrooming), is a trend in buying behaviour where customers research product information online, including verifying information to qualify their buying decision, before they decide to buy their chosen product in a physical store. This behaviour is very common and product category can impact the extent to which people do this.

Due to ROPO, having a good online presence can help to influence in-store sales. The ROPO effect allows companies that advertise to calculate their overall return on investment (ROI) more precisely, by multiplying their online sales with the online to store sales factor, where relevant. By doing this, the total revenue generated by an Online marketing advertising campaign becomes known to the advertiser. ROPO can in some instances be equated to Click and Collect sales, that is, the process of online reservation and subsequent collection of the product at a store. ROPO is one of the reasons having an effective Multichannel marketing strategy is important.

Its opposite is showrooming: researching a product in a physical store before buying it online. Several studies and sources have shown that researching online, before purchasing offline is more common than showrooming.

People who research online and purchase offline using the same company are known as loyal webroomers and those who purchase from a different business are known as competitive webroomers. Research has shown that shoppers who research online before purchasing offline focus more on product attributes and are more confident shoppers. Academic interest in researching this phenomenon is increasing.

== Prevalence ==
According to a 2011 Google report 80 percent of all offline buyers research online, before they buy a product in a local store. A 2019 survey of 2,000 shoppers in the UK and US, found that 74% of people research online before purchasing offline. Males and younger age groups were more likely to research online and purchase in a shop, compared with women and younger age groups. A 2023 survey found that 50% of Japanese people were found to be researching online before purchasing in a physical shop. Data reported in 2024 showed that 78% of Australian shoppers start their purchasing journey online before buying offline and that most people want an omnichannel shopping experience.

In high value product industries ROPO already makes a contribution to a significant share of total sales. This was acknowledged by an analysis of the German retail association and PricewaterhouseCoopers. This practice is common with certain categories of products, such as appliances (58% of purchases), electronics (54%) and apparel (49%).

== Economic effect ==
Brick-and-mortar stores can use ROPO to combat the negative effects of showrooming, such as by offering in-store discounts, employing knowledgeable staff, or free delivery on store pickups.

Such buying behaviours create challenges in how companies measure advertising effectiveness. Boots worked with Criteo and LiveRamp to analyse the impact of online advertising on offline sales with results showing a 22% uplift in return on advertising spend, when including both online and offline sales data.
