= Artificial intelligence in customer experience =

Usage of artificial intelligence

Artificial intelligence in customer experience is the use and development of artificial intelligence (AI) to aid and improve customer experience (sometimes abbreviated to CX AI).

Chatbots are often seen as the first step in the development of AI within the industry, but more tailored offerings are slowly becoming available. The use of artificial intelligence in the space has since become more diverse than simply chatbots, with AI underpinning entire CX cloud platforms now used at major corporations. Contact center as a service (CCaaS) has become a core solution of the CX (customer experience) industry, with the CCaaS market size expected to reach $17.19 Billion by 2030 in the United States alone.

== History ==
As with many AI applications, CX AI early implementation case studies have demonstrated that AI can increase the quality of customer interactions and therefore the overall experience that organizations can provide. This in turn has suggested a higher return on investment and/or revenue as a result. The beginning of the revolution of customer experience and the use of machine learning was with chatbots. The use of this type of AI can be traced back to Alan Turing in 1950, when the Church–Turing thesis suggested that computers could use "formal reasoning" to reach conclusions.

In 2017, Meta produced one of the first breakthroughs for everyday use of AI for customer experience when it allowed Facebook users to create their own messaging bots for free on its Facebook messenger platform. The main focus of this was to both automate and improve customer experience and interaction.

In 2023, CCaaS vendors began announcing the integration of ChatGPT’s generative AI into their CX solutions. Generative AI adds a layer of semantics into AI outputs. This was a major breakthrough for conversational AI. Using natural language processing and conversational AI, chatbots could enhance the level of service they could provide, speaking to customers in an easy-to-understand and conversational tone.

== Applications ==
Currently the main location for the application of CX AI in the sector is in contact centers. Historically, contact centers were simply known as call centers, but in recent years differentiation developed between the two terms. Call centers provide phone support, while contact centers also provide support via digital channels in addition to analogue phone systems. Contact centers are therefore seen as a complete customer service solution, where as call centers simply cover one aspect of customer interactions.

As a part of improving CX, AI is also improving the employee experience. AI is able to automate tasks to free up time for contact center agents to focus on higher priority tasks. For example, AI can be used for auto summarization. This means that instead of human agents having to summarize customer interactions now AI can do it, saving organizations time and money.
