= Experience model =

An experience model is a description of the key attributes that drive end-user experience when interacting with a system, product, or service. These attributes may be a combination of end-user attributes and those of the system or environment. These attributes are typically uncovered as insights exposed through behavioral research. Experience models are typically visually represented by abstract diagrams or visualizations to enhance understanding of the attributes and how they influence experience and engagement. The value of an experience model is to help designers focus on solution options that are most likely to improve end-user experience outcomes.

== How to Create Experience Models ==
- See Building Experience Models in Contextual Design: Design for Life, Second Edition (Holtzblatt and Beyer)

== See also ==
- Customer Experience
- User experience
- User experience design
