= Employee experience design =

Theory in the field of human resource management

Employee experience design (EED or EXD) is the application of experience design in order to intentionally design HR products, services, events, and organizational environments with a focus on the quality of the employee experience whilst providing relevant solutions for an organization.

== Overview ==
EED can be described as the "intentional design of the active or passive use of HR products or services", and employee experiences in general, that affect employees' emotional reactions and therefore their particular behaviors and loyalty.

The underlying assumption is that best (customer/employee) relationships are emotional in nature and achieved when companies succeed in not only satisfying certain needs (e.g. compensation), but also making interactions pleasurable.

The goal is to yield better customer experience through increased employee engagement and employee empowerment. Following Krippendorf, EED focuses on creating meaningful and sense-making opportunities for engagement, and addressing aspirational and fundamental psychological needs of an employee, such as autonomy, competence and relatedness.

== Methods ==
Related to design strategy, EED is a participatory systems approach to workplace improvements that applies methods and principles of experience design, such as design thinking, co-creation and empathic design and new digital tools and technologies. It also uses tools and techniques that are typical to customer experience management and service design, e.g. employee experience journey mapping or touchpoint analysis.

Primary design object is the employee experience, which – when successful – an employee finds unique, memorable and sustainable over time, would want to repeat and build upon, and enthusiastically promotes via word of mouth. It is suspected to encourage loyalty by creating an emotional connection through engaging, compelling, and consistent context. The categories for employee experience design context are products, processes, artefacts, content, space and interactions.

While employee experience design is beneficial to create positive customer experiences, it is also beneficial for non-customer-facing roles.

Many elements can make up a successful employee experience, including office environment, reward and benefits, flexible working and casual dress policies.

== Stakeholders ==
Human resource management, operating across hierarchies and departments, plays a central role in design, distribution and delivery of EED. As co-creation is an important design principle, it is a shared task and joint responsibility of leadership, HR professionals and employees. Following the logic of the service-profit chain, beneficiaries are also customers, as the recipients of improved service quality and the organization itself through increased profits.
