= Brick and mortar =

Class of organisations or businesses

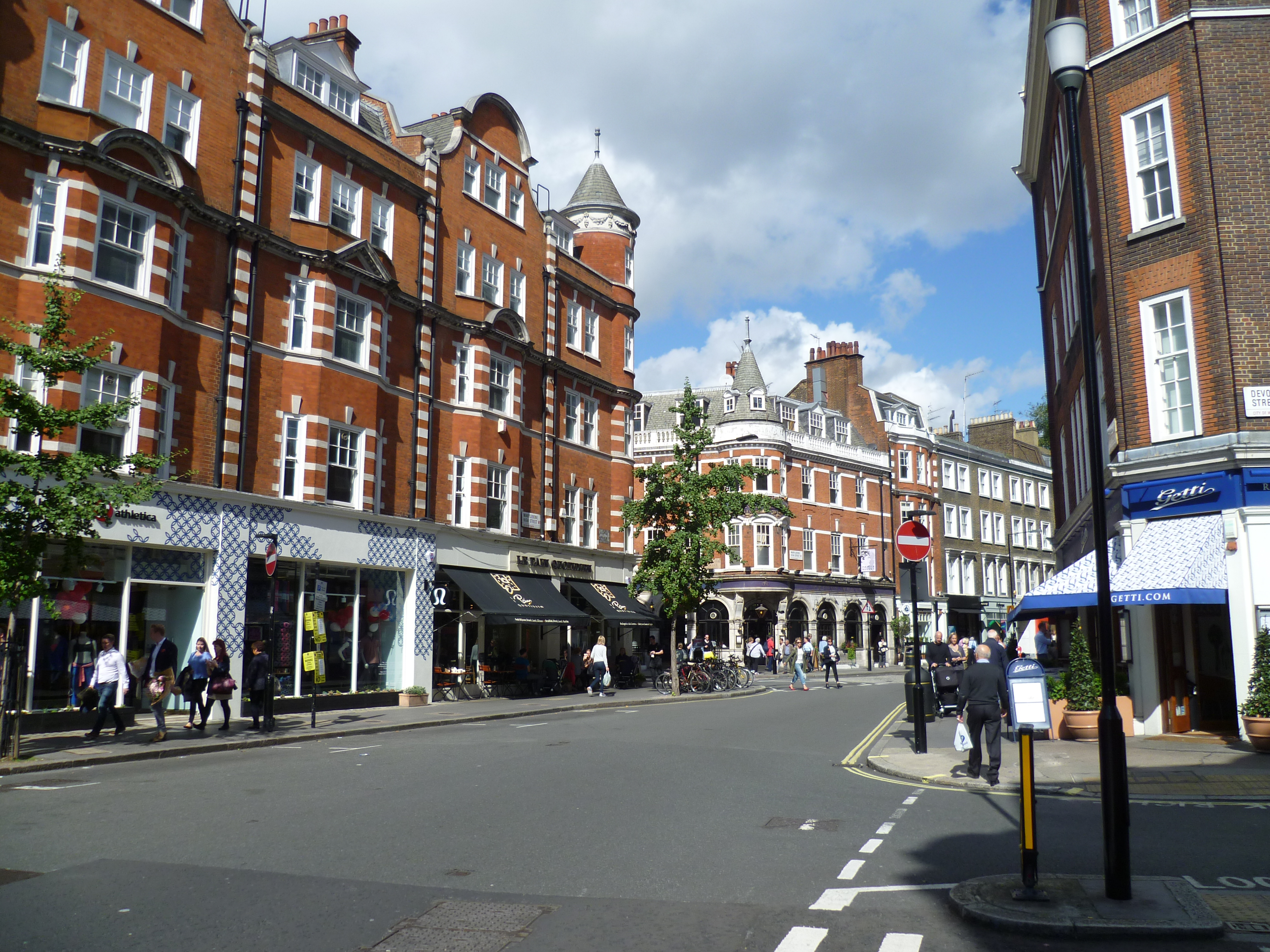
Bricks and mortar retail shops on Marylebone High Street, London

Brick and mortar (sometimes B&M; commonly bricks and mortar in British English) is an organization or business with a physical presence in a building or other structure. The term brick-and-mortar business is often used to refer to a company that possesses or leases retail shops, factory production facilities, or warehouses for its operations. More specifically, in the jargon of e-commerce businesses in the 2000s and on, brick-and-mortar businesses have a physical presence (e.g., a retail shop in a building) and offer face-to-face customer experiences.

This term is usually used to contrast with a transitory business or an Internet-only presence, such as fully online shops, which have no physical presence for shoppers to visit, talk with staff in person, touch and handle products, or buy from the firm in person. However, such online businesses normally have non-public physical facilities from which they either run business operations (e.g., the company headquarters and back office facilities), and/or warehouses for storing and distributing products.

== History ==
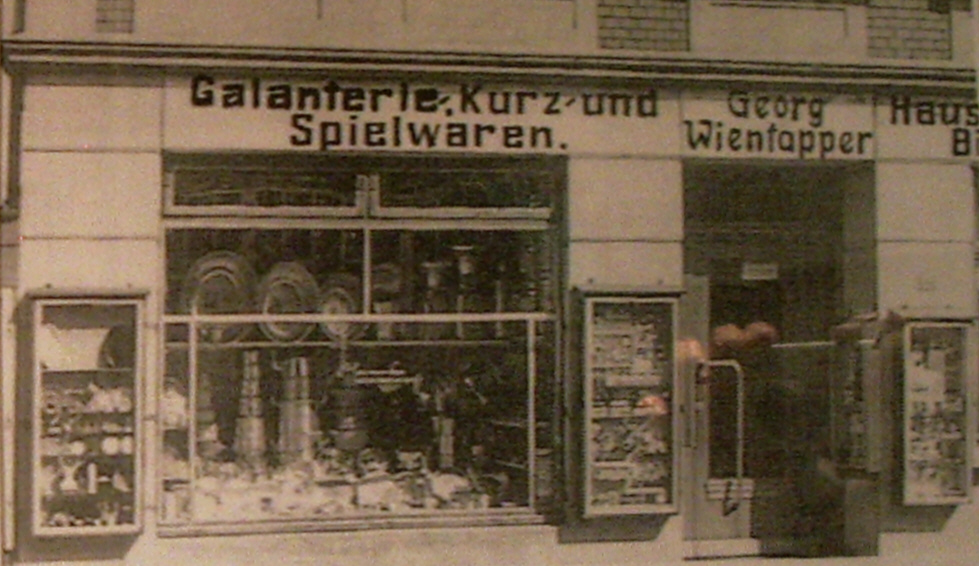
The Galanterie-, Kurz- und Spielwaren-Laden store in Uetersen, Germany in 1901

All large retailers in the 19th and the early to mid-20th century started off with a smaller brick-and-mortar presence, which increased as the businesses grew. A prime example of this is McDonald's, a company that started with one small restaurant and now has nearly 36,000 restaurants in over 120 countries and plans to grow further; this shows the importance of having a physical presence.

== Decline ==
Netflix, an online movie streaming website founded in 1997, is an example of how an online business has affected a B&M businesses such as video rental stores. After Netflix and similar companies became popular, traditional DVD rental stores such as Blockbuster LLC went out of business. Customers preferred to be able to instantly watch movies and TV shows using "streaming", or even having the DVD mailed to them, without having to go to a physical rental store to rent a DVD, and then return to the store to give the DVD back. "The rapid rise of online film streaming offered by the likes of Lovefilm and Netflix made Blockbuster's video and DVD [rental] business model practically obsolete.'

There has been an increase in online retailers in the 2000s, as people are using e-commerce (online sales) to fulfill basic needs ranging from grocery shopping to book purchases. Sales through mobile devices such as tablet computers and smartphones have also risen in the 2000s: "While total online sales rose 18% year-on-year in December to £11.1 [B], according to the latest figures [January 2014] from e-tail industry body IMRG and advisory firm Capgemini, sales via mobile devices doubled to £3 [B].'

The increase in households where both adults work outside the home, combined with the convenience of shopping for and buying products and services online, has decreased the number of customers going to retail outlets, as consumers can access the same information about products and services without paying for gas, parking and other costs, thus saving them time and money. "Today’s consumers lead busy lives and [Bricks and Mortar] shopping takes time. Often it is a [challenging] task. Consumers find researching and shopping on the Web far more convenient than brick-and-mortar visits."

== Benefits ==
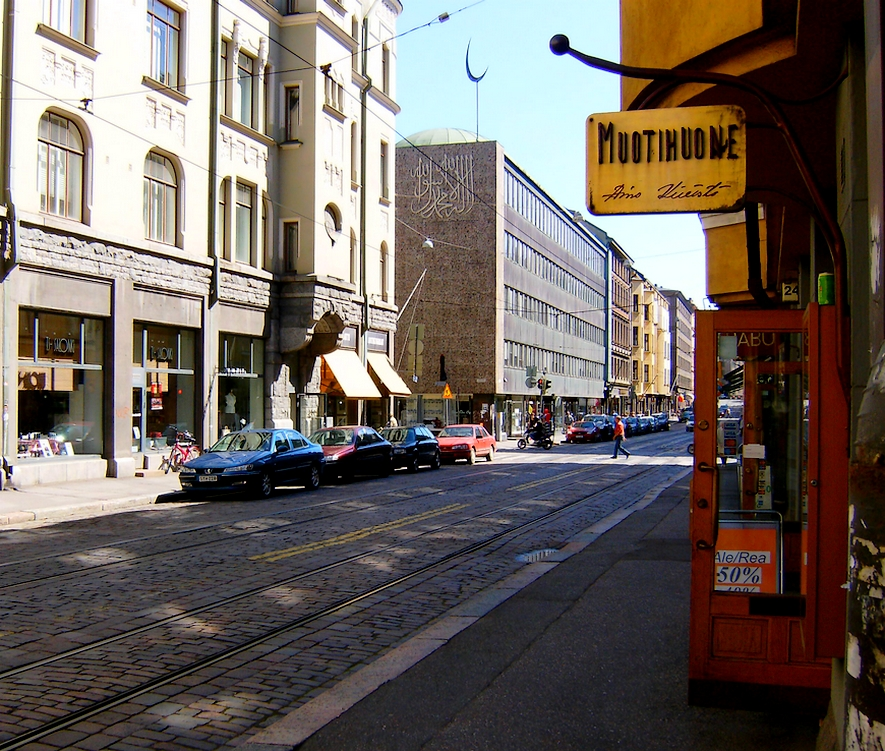
Bricks and mortar retail shops along the Fredrikinkatu street in the center of Helsinki, Finland

The presence of brick-and-mortar establishments may bring many benefits to businesses;

- Customer service: face-to-face customer service can be a big contributor into increasing sales of a business and improving customer satisfaction. When customers can take a product back to the store to ask staff questions or help them learn to use it, it can make customers feel more satisfied with their purchase. Research has shown that 86% of customers will pay more for a product if they have received great customer service.
- Face-to-face interaction: Many consumers prefer to be able to touch products, and experience and test them out before they buy. This is often attributed to Baby Boomers, older Generation X customers and the elderly being used to a more traditional in-person approach when it comes to shopping and preferring to have a demonstration of products or services, especially when buying new technology. Other studies show, given equal prices, a 90% preference for the in-person shopping experience, including among teens, who combine social interaction with shopping. On the other hand, many of these consumers engage in showrooming: trying on clothes or otherwise examining merchandise in-store, and then buying online at cheaper prices.
- Trust: Online commerce presents an increased risk of internet fraud, and thus some consumers may be averse to it.

== Drawbacks ==
The brick-and-mortar approach also has various drawbacks.

=== New businesses and fixed costs ===
Fixed costs are a serious challenge for B&M businesses. Fixed costs are payments that a business has to make for elements such as rent of a store and monthly payments for services such as a security alarm. Fixed costs stay the same for a business even if it ramps up its operations or winds down its operations during a slow period. In contrast, variable costs change as a business ramps its operations up or down. Variable costs include wages (for employees paid by the hour) and electricity for operating machinery used by the business during its operating hours. If a business increases its hours of operation, its hourly wages and electricity bill will rise, but its rent and security alarm costs will stay the same (assuming that the business does not add additional locations). Start-up companies and other small businesses typically find it hard to pay all of the fixed costs that are part of their venture. Research shows that 70% of new start up businesses fail within the first 10 years.

=== Inconvenient for customers with busy lifestyles ===
People have busier lifestyles in the 2010s, with more families having both adults working, and therefore they find it harder to find the time to physically go and shop at stores and services. As well, in many cities traffic jams and congestion on roads have made it more stressful and time-consuming to drive to physical locations to shop. Online shopping and online services, which consumers can access from an Internet-connected laptop or smartphone are more convenient for these people.

=== Expensive and luxury products ===
B&M increases the fixed cost for any business, therefore the products sold in physical shops tend to be more expensive compared to online shops. For stores selling expensive products or services in a B&M format, customers expect beautiful window displays, fine decorating in the establishment and well-dressed salespeople who earn high commission on their sales. Some high-end hair salons and luxury car stores even offer conveniences such as free espresso and bottled water, all of which add to the overhead of selling these products and services. Online shops, even those for luxury goods, do not have to pay for high-end retail stores and salespeople.

== See also ==
- Showrooming
- Bricks and clicks
- Retail apocalypse
- Storefront
- Online shopping
