= Moment of truth (marketing) =

Marketing term

Moment of truth (MOT) in marketing, is the moment when a customer/user interacts with a brand, product or service to form or change an impression about that particular brand, product or service. In 2005, A. G. Lafley, Chairman, President & CEO of Procter & Gamble coined two "Moments of Truth". A third was introduced later.

== Types of MoTs ==
- First moment of truth (FMOT): When a customer is first confronted with the product, either offline or online. It occurs within the first 3-7 seconds of a consumer encountering the product and it is during this time that marketers have the capability of turning a browser into a buyer. Procter & Gamble describe the first moment of truth as the "moment a consumer chooses a product over the other competitors offerings".
- Second moment of truth (SMOT): When a customer purchases a product and experiences its quality as per the promise of the brand. There can be multiple second moments of truth for every time the product is consumed (used), providing the consumer with information for future purchases and for sharing their experience with the product/service.
- Third moment of truth (TMOT): When consumers give feedback or reactions towards a brand, product or service, i.e., consumer becomes brand advocate and gives back via word of mouth or social media publishing.
- Zero moment of truth (ZMOT) is a term coined by Google in 2011, it refers to the research which is conducted online about a product or service before taking any action, i.e., searching for mobile reviews before making a purchase. The Internet has changed altogether the way consumers interact with brands, products or services. This online decision-making moment is termed as ZMOT. According to research conducted by Google, 88% of US customers are researching online before actually buying the product.
- Actual moment of truth was identified by Amit Sharma, Founder & CEO of Narvar, to describe the new post-purchase experience gap created by the advent of online shopping, after a consumer has made a purchase but before they've received the product.
