= B. Joseph Pine II =

American author (born 1958)

B. Joseph Pine (born 1958) is an American author. He coined the term "experience economy".

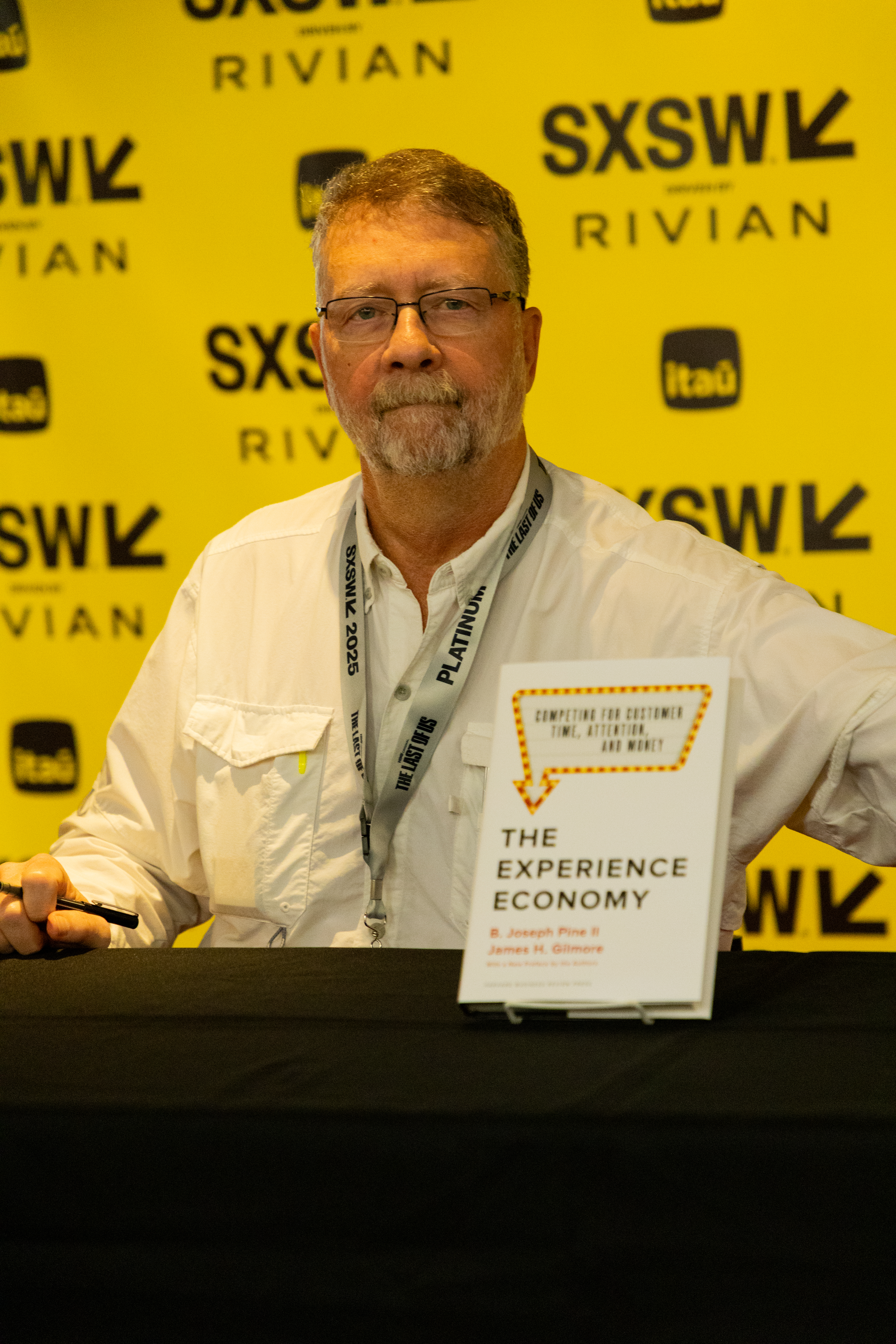
Pine at SXSW 2025

== Bibliography ==
- Mass Customization: The New Frontier in Business Competition, 1992
- Do You Want to Keep Your Customers Forever?, B. Joseph Pine II, Don Peppers, Martha Rogers, Harvard Business Review Classics (Originally published in Harvard Business Review in March 1995), 2010
- The Experience Economy: Work is Theatre & Every Business a Stage, B. Joseph Pine, James H. Gilmore, 1999
- Authenticity: What Consumers Really Want, 2007

== Video ==
- TED Talks, 2009
- Yes, And, 2006

== Sources ==
- Design & Emotion - Interview with Joseph Pine - Getting Emotional With... Joe Pine (2010) URL: http://www.design-emotion.com/2010/06/22/getting-emotional-with-joe-pine/
