= Showrooming =

Shopping practice

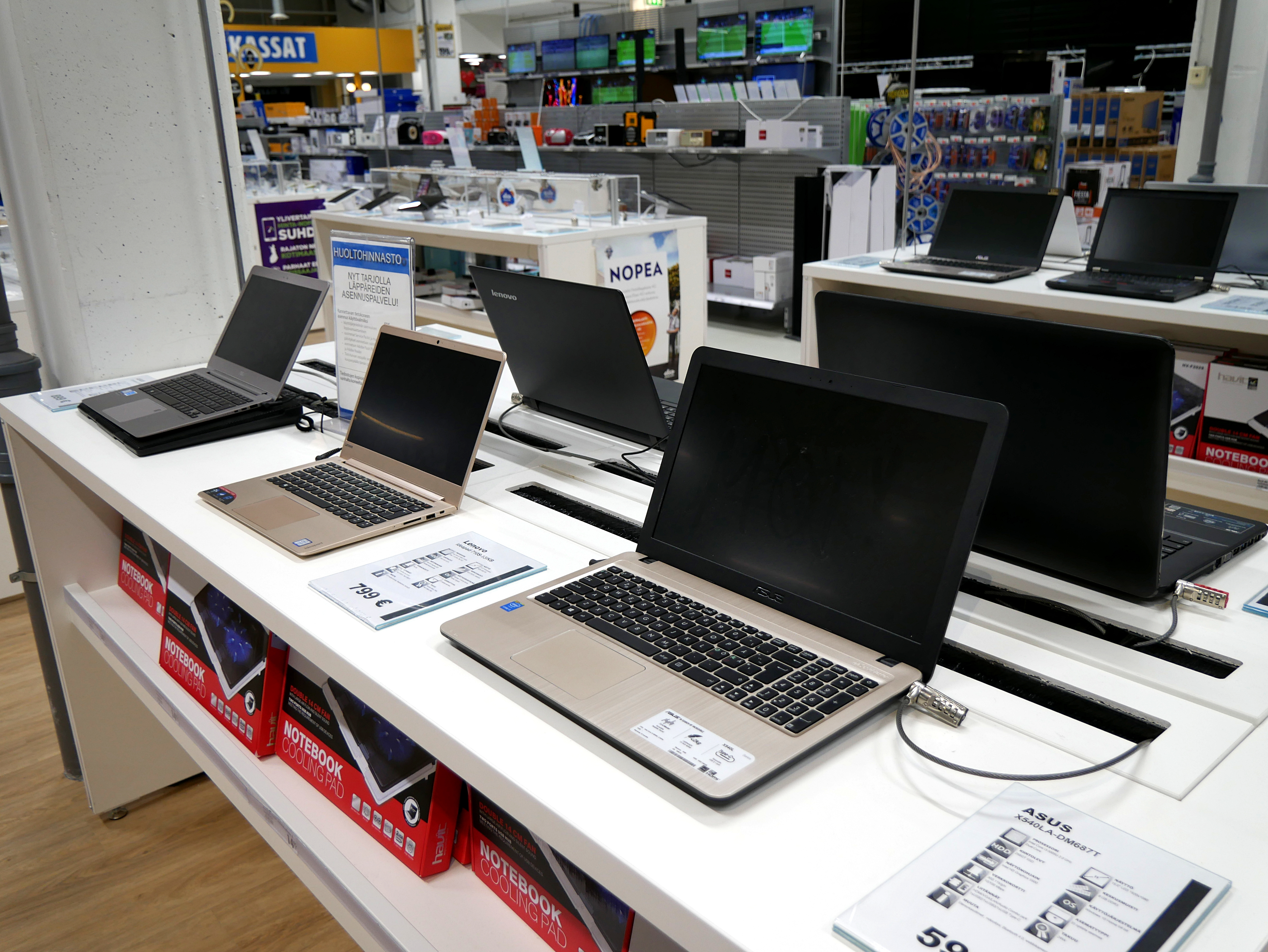
Electronic items are among those frequently examined by customers in a retail store prior to their online purchase.

Showrooming is the practice of examining merchandise in a traditional brick-and-mortar retail store or other offline setting, and then buying it online, sometimes at a lower price. Online stores often offer lower prices than their brick-and-mortar counterparts because they do not have the same overhead cost. Staff writers at the Wharton School have observed that showrooming and buying elsewhere is not new in itself, but its impact has become more significant with the greater availability of online purchasing.

The reverse phenomenon of showrooming is "research online, purchase offline", also known as webrooming. This is where customers research a product online before buying it at a physical store.

== Prevalence ==
A 2012 comScore study found 35% of U.S. consumers reported showrooming and of those, half were between 25 and 34 years old. A 2013 survey polled 750 U.S. consumers, 73% of whom reported having showroomed in the previous six months. However, three years of data collected and analyzed by Deloitte, refutes the prevalence of showrooming. Deloitte found that, in fact, customers who use a digital device in-store as part of their shopping process were actually more likely to make a purchase – not less.

== Effects on retailers ==
Showrooming can be costly to retailers, not only in terms of the loss of the sale, but also due to damage caused to the store's floor samples of a product through repeated examination from consumers.

However, some modern retailers have begun to view showrooming as a benefit rather than a threat, as it allows them to maintain smaller physical store footprints with lower inventory costs while using the space purely for customer relationship building.

Showrooming was said to be behind the collapse of UK photography chain Jessops and Target's decision to discontinue carrying the Amazon Kindle.

== Efforts to combat showrooming by retailers ==
Many retailers have tried to compete with showroomers by slashing their own prices. Independent businesses, however, are advised to counter showrooming by adding value via included services and other tactics, such as making information and reviews more readily available to customers so that they might not choose to seek it out online.

Some major retailers, such as Target, are attempting to battle showrooming by selling products exclusive to their stores. Walmart is allowing customers to avoid the shipping charges of online purchases by picking up the items in the stores. The same practice is expanding to European countries.

Some specialty fashion stores in the U.S. and Australia have introduced a "fitting fee" for browsing, which is refunded in full if the customer makes a purchase.

Best Buy has guaranteed to match the online price of goods listed on Amazon.com, and in April 2013 announced it would begin to lease out space to manufacturers such as Samsung, so customers can view working products and then purchase them at the MSRP.

== See also ==
- Showroom
