= Touchpoint =

Way of interaction of consumers with an organization

In marketing, a touchpoint describes any instance where a consumer interacts with an organisation's brand or image. This can include traditional advertising or company-owned resources such as a website, public exposure, and personal recommendations.

A brand touchpoint, also known as a brand encounter, is formed when a consumer is exposed to a brand. This exposure can occur in many different forms, such as an advertisement featured on television, radio, in a newspaper, or in a magazine. Other forms of advertising could include a display on a billboard located on the roadside, discussions regarding the product on talkback radio, a product in a window display, or a verbal discussion between friends and family, all giving exposure to the brand. All of these touchpoints create a "brand experience" for the consumer.

Touchpoints are the first association that a consumer has with a product or service offered by a company or individual and are the contact points between a consumer and said provider of services. The touchpoint offers a link between the consumer and the service, acting as a go-between for what the consumer wants and what the service provider is offering, providing a central service in the communication between customer and supplier (2011: 16). A touchpoint is the first interaction that a customer has with a company and that interaction is considered as the starting point of a customer journey (2011:15). The customer journey/experience is the full involvement that a customer has with a particular brand, starting at the first connection between customer and service, and ending with the purchasing of a product or service and the advocacy of said product or service to others (Richardson, 2010). Touchpoints provide the basis and foundations for information gathering techniques used by customers.

Within modern marketing, business, and service providing, there is a focus on the experiences of the customer base during the customer-supplier interaction (Voss and Zomerdijk, 2007). The customer journey perspective in marketing highlights the importance of multiple components that interact with each other and the customer, with the visual, audio, and social aspects of a marketing strategy being crucial for a successful customer journey (2007: 2). The strong importance placed on the customer experience over pure product has been established due to the increasingly competitive marketplace in which products and services exist (Khanna, Jacob, Yadav, 2014). Touchpoints make up an important and effective means of interacting with a customer base and build a notion and image of a brand within the memory of a customer. Successful businesses utilise touchpoints to build an image of what they can offer to customers, straightforward communication between parties, and value that comes with the purchase of products or services (Hogan, Almiquist, & Glynn, 2005).

== In consumer decision-making ==
The consumer decision-making process is influenced by brand touchpoints; touchpoints influence the pre-purchase, purchase, and post-purchase stages of the decision-making process. This is because brands are constantly in contact with consumers by way of experiences (touchpoints) with the brand or service, advertising (all forms), contact with employees, social media, and many other ways. Each stage of the decision-making process is also an opportunity for the brand to influence the consumer's decisions, regardless of whether or not the consumer has made a decision to purchase.

There are many ways in which touchpoints can influence the pre-purchase stage of the consumer decision-making process. The pre-purchase stage is said to be one of the most important stages of the consumer decision-making process, as it includes the point where the consumer recognizes that they have a need for a product or service. It is at this point of realization that pre-purchase touchpoints are crucial because this triggers the consumer to actively search for information about a certain product. Such searches for information can be actively conducted via searching in advertising, social media, internet search, or word-of-mouth and finding out family and friend’s experiences, etc. It is important that during this stage, in order for consumers to consider purchasing from a brand, that the brand creates relevant touchpoints that increase their appeal. Modern consumers have access to multiple electronic devices such as smartphones, laptops, tablets, and televisions and are sometimes connected simultaneously to all devices. As a result, brands may not acquire the desired amount of exposure because of the consumer's tendency to frequently switch from one device to another and from one task to another task. Therefore, brands must create short and engaging advertisements to capture the attention of the consumer during the pre-purchase stage of his or her decision-making process. Such action will ensure that the consumer will be able to relate to a brand and will instill the belief that the brand has their interests at heart. Brands or companies cannot precisely manage the touchpoints at the pre-purchase stage to work in their favor. They can only do so much to make sure they monitor the channels by which consumers search for product/service information to make sure they are readily accessible.

Touchpoints for the "purchase" stage of the decision-making process are somewhat more direct. In this stage, the consumer evaluates the information they have searched for in the pre-purchase stage. Evaluation in this sense is when the consumer has selected a set of brands from their information search and compared them to one another. At this point of the consumer decision-making process, brand touchpoints become the difference between a decision to buy and a decision not to buy. Touchpoints during the purchase stage are more direct than the pre-purchase stage because touchpoints during the purchase stage can be found in the store (or office if looking for a service) as the store layout, through the sales team and staff, the point of sale, and in many other elements. The store layout is a whole touchpoint in itself as it includes all types of atmospherics that help influence consumers. Such atmospherics involve using the senses to relate to consumers on a more personal level through the use of store scents, visual appearance, music, and the ability to touch products. This can be further explained using the concept of "The Consumer’s Culture" where the psychological core of the consumer determines the effectiveness of brand touchpoints and influence. When consumers are exposed to such elements of a brand, it is at that point where they make the decision to buy or even the decision not to buy. To reduce the chance of having the consumer turning away from buying a particular brand, companies ensure their staff are properly trained in product knowledge and interpersonal skills. Effective staff are important since customer touchpoints with staff are a physical and human representation of the brand. Therefore, it is important for customers to have a sense of trust in the brand or the company, and the staff need to build rapport with the customer to retain such trust. This trust and rapport can be strengthened at the point of sale, where the customer purchases a product and feels that the product they have chosen may serve their needs.

Finally, the post-purchase stage of the decision-making process is vital for the brand to retain their customers. Interactions between the brand and consumer after the purchase still count as touchpoints. Examples of post-purchase touch points are customer satisfaction surveys, product services, post-purchase customer service and support, loyalty programs, and even billing processes. All such touchpoints enable brands or companies to nurture the relationship between consumer and brand and, if successful, retain the customer. These touchpoints also provide brands with a sense of being able to control the post-purchase element of a consumer's decision-making process in a more effective manner. Companies hope to maintain a positive perception of the brand, that customers will relate to the brand on a positive level through these touchpoints. Post-purchase touchpoints are especially important for brands to be seen as readily available to, and accessible, by customers for the customer to remain trusting of the brand. Otherwise, the customer may perceive the brand treating them as a quick opportunity to make a sale with no post-purchase care.

== Usage in everyday business communications ==
Businesses that offer products or services directly to customers use touchpoints in order to improve the relationship with the consumer and create brand recognition (Roll, 2015). Companies that offer services such as transport, mobile phone packages, flights, and rental cars create awareness of themselves through the intensive or minimal, targeted or broad use of touchpoints (Hogan, et al., 2005), which portray certain positive aspects of their company to prospective clients and customers. The choosing of (a) suitable touchpoint/s send messages to the customers about what values the company holds in high esteem. This is particularly important in the marketing of products in heavily filled marketplaces such as telecommunications, with companies producing tech-information services to retain customers in a competitive marketplace (Ojiako, Chipulu and Graesser, 2012).

Touchpoints are important in the everyday communication of business ideas, creating brand encounters with potential customers, the satisfactory results of purchase and the retention of previous customers. Pre-purchase experiences of a customer are in relation to their behaviors before the business interaction between consumer and company. These experiences before purchase are crucial in the marketing of a brand or product (Gardial, Clemons, Woodruff, Schumann and Burns, 1994) as potential customers base their decisions on direct marketing decisions such as price and incentives, or are coerced by advertising and marketing campaigns. These touchpoints are created in order to influence customers before they have even decided on a product to purchase, coercive and invisible methods of design assert systematic authority over potential customers and become systems that create value before purchase has happened (Mager and Sung, 2011). The in store purchase experience is the next point of interest in the customer's interaction with a brand. When a customer has decided to purchase a product the sales agents, packaging of the product and in-store marketing are touchpoints that are in use to bridge the communication gap between brand and customer (Marin, 2014). These touchpoints are in place to specifically to influence the customer in regards to which purchase they make through effective control of layout and in store marketing (Marin, 2014). Despite online shopping being in a steady growth period, the fundamentally important aspect of customer interaction on a face-to-face level is still needed and aided through the use of in-store touchpoints (Drodge, 2015). These specific demographics, such as millennials and are adept at utilizing different means and technologies in order to acquire products and services that fit their needs. Through the use of product advocacy, customers are also in contact with brands after the purchase has been completed, lending their consumer expertise to how the product functions and recommending said product to other potential consumers. The success of post purchase touchpoints relies on the advocacy of customers to resell the treatment they received during their in store purchase experience. The most prized customer is one who recommends the brand to others, feeling that their expectations have been met and they achieved what they wanted in store (Flynn, 2013). The reliance on the quality of the product or service itself is a crucial way for brands to build a loyal customer base and this is an important touchpoint. With the quality of the product being of high importance, so too is the continuation of the brand-customer communication relationship through after purchase touchpoints (Flynn, 2013).

== Brand customer touch-point types ==
Within the customer journey from pre- to post-purchase, there are different stages at which communication between customer and brand occurs through the use of touch-points. The categories of touch-points range from brand originated, intrinsic, highly controllable mediums to customer, initiated and unexpected modes of communication (Brand Customer Touch-Points, 2007). These methods of communication through touch-points include:

=== Company-created touchpoints ===
A company-created touchpoint is one that is created and controlled by the company or brand. These touch-points are pre-planned modes of communicating a message through physical channels, such as banner adverts and in store decorations. These methods are used to publicize certain directives to customers. These types of touchpoints operate in a traditional manner, visibly advertising a message the brand wants to convey.

=== Intrinsic touchpoints ===
These intrinsic touchpoints are in use when a customer is in store or in the act of purchasing a product or service (EClub News, 2012). Touchpoints such as timely and adept customer service is in constant use during the purchase period. These touchpoints are often human oriented; messages being communicated between customer service operator or staff and actual customers. This type of touchpoint is vital for communicating a brand's message and modus operandi, be it a family store that looks after customers on a personal level or a global company that can offer the best prices (Brand Customer Touch Points, 2007).

=== Unexpected touchpoints ===
Unexpected touchpoints are out of control of the brands themselves but can be influenced by good business practices. These touchpoints are the communication from outside stakeholders, often dissatisfied or satisfied customers. These shareholders communicate between themselves, higher powers within the brand or company and review websites. These communications are touchpoints which hugely affect the reputation of the brand. The unexpected touchpoints of a company are out of their hands but also reliant on the decisions made by customers in regard to their pre purchase, in store and post purchase experiences. It's not only customers but employees that also create unexpected touchpoints, speaking about their treatment within a company, pay rates and other customers with family or friends (EClub News, 2012). This all has unexpected consequences to a brand, either positive or negative, that can affect reputation of their product or service.

=== Customer-initiated touchpoints ===
Much like the unexpected touchpoints, customer-initiated touchpoints are a communication between customer and brand directly, without purchase. Unlike other touchpoints, these customer-initiated touchpoints are created solely by customers relaying the experiences they received from the brand/company directly back to the brand/company. Again, these are particularly difficult to control directly yet can be managed effectively and can portray a positive message to customers through actions such as a help desk or suggestions line. These touchpoints, created by customers and transferred directly to companies/brands, are effective ways of keeping in communication with customers even after they have finished their purchasing, evolving a brand and growing a customer base.

== Brand Touchpoint Wheel ==
The Brand Touchpoint Wheel displays the various ways in which consumers interact with an organization's brand, creating higher brand education. Brand touchpoint segments can be split into pre-purchase, purchase, and post-purchase experience. These all help influence the consumer's purchasing decision.

The pre-purchase experience shows the diverse range of interactions the consumer has with the brand and product before they enter the store. This touchpoint interaction is devised to increase brand awareness and increase a consumer's perception and expectation of the brand. These touchpoints should highlight the brand's features, and benefits over other competing products increasing the brand's value to the consumers. The pre purchase segment in the brand touchpoint wheel allows the customer to decide if the product or service will fulfill their needs and wants. The benefits of pre-purchase touchpoints are that they engage prospective customers, as well as retaining current customers. During this segment of the buying process people have access to knowledge of the brand, which allows them to see if they will gain from selecting this product or service over another competing brand. An example of a pre-purchase touchpoint is public relations. Public relations creates positivity around the brand, as well as media influence over prospective customers. Websites and advertising are other pre-purchase touchpoints, which allow customers to engage and learn about products or services.

The purchase experience touchpoints help the consumer shift from considering the brand to actually making a purchase. These interactions include presentation of the store, point of sale, displays and assistance from a sales person. These touchpoints and interactions influence the consumer's purchasing decision and help the consumer feel confident about the product they are purchasing, maximizing the value of the product.

The post-purchase touchpoints are those that appear after the sale has taken place to maximize the experience the consumer has received. This can be achieved through after sales services such as loyalty programs, newsletters and emails to ensure ongoing sales. Consumers who have experienced quality customer service in store are more likely to return for further purchases. These touchpoints increase brand loyalty, providing long term value between the consumers and the company. Brand touchpoint segments can be split into pre-purchase, purchase experience and post-purchase experience.

The pre-purchase segment in the brand touchpoint wheel allows the customer to decide if the product or service will fulfill their needs and wants. The benefits of pre-purchase touchpoints are that they engage prospective customers, as well as retaining current customers. During this segment of the buying process people have access to knowledge of the brand, which allows them to see if they will gain from selecting this product or service over another competing brand. An example of a pre-purchase touchpoint is public relations. Public relations create positivity around the brand, as well as media influence over prospective customers. Websites and advertising are other pre-purchase touchpoints, which allow customers to engage and learn about products or services.

The purchase experience is the point in the buying process, which converts the prospective customer into actually buying the product or service if they see the benefits are great enough. Packaging, in-store sampling and price- value relationship all affect the purchase experience. The customer must feel they have reaped benefits that are greater than the price they have paid for the product or service. The Brand Touchpoint Wheel demonstrates that the sales force is a large contributor in this experience, as this will leave the consumer feeling either satisfied or dissatisfied with the purchase process (Khanna, 2014).

The post purchase experience is the interaction with satisfaction the consumer receives after the sale or service has taken place. This is the stage where the brand and the customer may commence a long-term relationship. And the buyer can choose to become a part of the brand's community by joining a loyalty program or agreeing to receive promotional emails. If the customer is satisfied with the purchase of their product or service, they will most likely be a recurring buyer and will recommend the product or service to their peers. (Longoria S. D.)

== Touchpoints and consumer experience ==
A consumer's brand experience is based on the interactions they incur with the brand. Their experience can be shaped through both direct and indirect experiences contributing to their overall perception of the brand. Touchpoints create value for consumers and the customer-brand relationship as they come into several contact points with the brand over time.

There are three types of brand touchpoints that influence the consumer's brand experience and consideration to purchase. The first is brand owner touchpoints, which is any form of brand advertising directly controlled by the company. The second is retail touchpoints, which include retail advertising, such as promotions and a range of in-store communications, which are also directly controlled by the company. The third is the range of third-party touchpoints which includes word of mouth, peer observation, and traditional earned media. Some third-party touchpoints can be detrimental to the consumer's perception of the brand specifically word of mouth. The negative experience of one customer can create negativity towards the product and influence prospective purchasers turning them against the brand.

Touchpoints are used in order to persuade as well as engage customers to commit to a specific brand over other competing brands. Brand advertising is advertising by the owner of the brand or the retailer, which will give potential customers information that may persuade them into buying goods and services. In-store communications is a touchpoint, which includes viewing in store posters, and seeing display goods, it is the communication between seller and buyer in the store environment. Third party touchpoints are elements such as word-of-mouth, which can be defined as any conversation held in person or online discussing a specific brand. Peer observation is another third-party touchpoint as it is the effect of other customers in the consumption or retail environment. Traditional media is another such as news coverage and editorial information.

A study at the University of South Australia conducted by the marketing school, explored the effect of different touchpoints on brand consideration. The following categories were evaluated; 1. Brand advertisements, 2. In-Store communications 3. Word of mouth, 4. Peer observation, and 5. Traditional media.

The highest ranked touchpoint was in-store communications, an example being the display of products in retail outlets, and the communication of information from seller to buyer delivered by a salesperson. In store communication and display of goods led to unplanned purchases in the retail environment. Multi-sensory communication from store to customer where a customer can visually see products, smell them, and taste them such as supermarket in store cooking demonstrations. This creates an opportunity for unplanned purchases.

The second ranked touchpoint was brand advertising and then peer observation. Whether the advertising is endorsement by celebrities or people regarded highly in peer groups. Visually seeing another peer wearing or using a specific product or service can entice a prospective buyer into choosing that same good. Word of mouth was ranked next; there was more positivity in peer observation as a touchpoint in comparison however. Ranked last was traditional media, which could be explained by the shift to guerrilla type marketing styles. This is a new way of engaging public customers in a more inexpensive way, while keeping customers encouraged to buy (Navrátilová, 2015) (Baxendale, 2015).

The way in which the brand reaches out to the individual is what leaves them with a customer experience in the hopes that they will remember the brand. Customer experience is important in the communication process from seller to buyer as if the product or service is not promoted and people cannot see what they will receive for the transaction of purchasing the good their willingness to buy will decline.

=== Company-created touchpoints ===
Touchpoints allow marketers to deliver brand messages, increase consumer's knowledge of the brand and strengthen the company's customer-brand relationship, while adding value to the brand or product. When planning marketing touchpoints, marketers focus their attention on creating touchpoints that are most critical in forming and maintaining consumer relationships with the brand. Each company has communication objectives they look to achieve through having effective communication with their consumers through persuasion, influencing the brand voice and personality, creating a positive feeling towards the brand and driving sales.

When a consumer enters a store, they intend to convert their pre-existing intentions into purchases. These pre-existing intentions are formed through pre-purchase experience touchpoints. These touchpoints include advertising, promotions, social media, word of mouth among others which allow consumers to interact with the brand before entering the store. However, the store itself also contains in-store communications which have the ability to introduce new brands to the consumer and influence spontaneous purchases. Of the aforementioned touchpoints the company only has direct control over the brand's advertising, however, still has an influence on other touchpoints. Maintaining a diverse range of touchpoints is vital in evolving the consumer's attitudes and behaviors towards the brand.

Touchpoint interactions create benefits for the company as they are able to access feedback to monitor customer satisfaction, providing them with customer insights and allowing them to understand and meet the needs of their customers. They also allow the company to deliver a greater number of brand messages, emphasize promises between the brand and the customer and increase customer involvement with the brand. Traditional brand touchpoints have been utilized for many years such as, ad campaigns, media advertising, promotions, and events. In present day, non-marketing communication touchpoints seem to have a larger influence on consumers and their relationship with the brand, such as word of mouth and social media.

=== Customer-initiated touchpoints ===
Customer-initiated touchpoints are influenced through consumers and their experience with the company, however, are not created by the company. Customer-initiated touchpoints can include product use; products purchase as well as visiting a brand's website. The most influential customer-initiated touchpoint is word of mouth where their experience was shared and may influence other consumer's perceptions towards this brand.

=== Paid touchpoints ===
Paid touchpoints refer to different forms of advertising that marketers use to deliver their planned messages and communicate to consumers through different paid mediums. Paid touchpoints are traditional forms of media such as television, print, and radio. Using multiple different media platforms to communicate the same message is very effective and reaches a larger target audience.

Television advertising is a paid touchpoint that reaches audiences across multiple channels: their home, waiting area, malls, and any other place televisions could be available. This touchpoint has a very strong effect on the audience, to the point that for some it could be equivalent of a salesperson (Fill, et al., 2013). Television advertisement can be highly captive and adsorbent. It has the advantages of Multi-sensory appeal; sound, music, dialogue, movement, photos, written scripture, product and so on ("Television advertising pros and cons" n.d.). These visuals create a brand image in the audience's mind (Fill et al.,2013). Television advertisement is a paid touchpoint for mass marketing. It reaches way more audience than newspaper, magazine or radios ("Television advertising pros and cons" n.d.). These days, companies can choose a target market segment not only for the specific audience demographically but also geographically, specific local areas (Leigh, n.d.). This is a huge advantage of Television advertisement. But when it comes to disadvantages for this paid touchpoint there is long list too. First of all, it is the most expensive paid touchpoint a company can choose. It finishes the advertisement budgets of small businesses really quickly ("Television advertising pros and cons" n.d.). Initial production cast for the commercial is also very high (Fill, et al.,2013). It includes paying writers, actors, film industry, advertisement agency and soon ("Television advertising pros and cons" n.d.). Second biggest problem with this paid touchpoint is that it is very short lived. Indeed, some seconds. Multiple studies also show that most audience can't recall the commercials they see on T.V (Fill, et al., 2013). This is also because during a commercial break audience are shown heaps of different commercial messages. Regardless of all these disadvantages many big companies, with big budgets, prefer this paid touchpoint in order to target mass audience ("Television advertising pros and cons" n.d.).

Another form paid touchpoint is print which involves newspaper advertising, magazines, brochures, point of sale, printed material at retail outlets and letterbox drops. Print advertisements can provide detailed information on the product however is in steady decline with the increase in social media.

The magazine is the most specialized paid touchpoints. in print media. It has many advantages compare to other print media, but it could be expensive. Magazines are the paid touchpoints that offer very high-Quality images, high-gloss, heavy paper, elegant and beautiful photos that really attracts the attention of a reader (Ives, 2011). High- quality magazine advertisement boosts the favorability by consumers (Appel, 1987). Furthermore, magazines are really highly selective (Fill, Hughes, & De Francesco, 2013). Each magazine targets a specific demographic (Russel, n.d.) such as sports. By advertising in a sports magazine, a company can reach the targeted audience; people who love sports and can advertise sports related products. In addition to this, magazines are kept for the longest period of time compared to other print media (Fill, et al., 2013). This is because their expiry dates in expanded by their presence in doctor's clinic, beauty salon and many other waiting areas (Russel, n.d.). So, it advertises the brand continuously. Additionally, people pay to get magazines (Fill, et al., 2013). This increases the chances for them to go through all the pages increasing the chances for the brand encounter. One more advantage of magazine advertisement is that it easily can become a multi-platform advertising channel (Fill, et al., 2013). Like; consumers reading the magazine (Offline), or consumers reading the magazine online. Online would come under using phones, computers, laptops, tablets and so on to read the magazine on their web page. On the contrary, magazine advertisements do have some disadvantages. For example, magazines are not good for mass advertisement at all (Russel, n.d.), because magazines only target specific demographics. Also, there could be many other advertisements on the magazine. This could cause confusion for consumers to choose between the brands. Additionally, whatever magazine a company chooses for advertisement, it would be expensive (Russel, n.d.). Another problem with magazine advertisement is that there is no flexibility with the deadline ("The advantages and disadvantages of magazine advertising", 2012). Sometimes a company would have to get the campaign ready two to three months before the publications of the magazine (Fill, et al., 2013). Overall, magazine advertisement could be great for target demographics. Some ways to deals with the disadvantages of magazines advertisements would be to prepare the campaign in well advance so that there would be minimum problems. Secondly, the company should try to make a very creative and attractive campaign in order to break through the clutter and appeal to a reader (Fill, et al., 2013).

Radio is another paid touchpoint. Radio advertisement is known as the "theatre of minds" as there are no visuals (Mateo, n.d.), so listeners have to imagine the brand image on their own. Good commercials on radio encourage listeners to have a unique picture of the brand (Fill, et al., 2013). If it is used effectively, it makes emotional connection with the listeners (Peacock, 2007). This could work in the favor of brand in long term. Another, big advantage of radio advertisement is that it is very cheap compared to other paid touchpoints (Ian, n.d.). A company can reach potential consumers frequently at low cost (Fill, etal.,2013). Reaching frequently, is very beneficial for emotional connection and thus brand favorability (Peacock, 2007). Just like magazine, Radio advertisement also reaches different demographics for targeting specific audience (Fill, et al., 2013). Different times of a day are for different kind of demographics, depending on what kind of programs are on, at that time. The most effective time for radio advertisement are the peak traffic hours; as people like to listen to radio when they are stuck in traffic (Fill, et al., 2013). Most companies like to have talk-back sessions about their brand. General people discuss on the radio what they think about a brand and where they encountered that brand. This could be a great way for brand awareness as well as brand loyalty. It is particularly excellent for small local businesses (Ian, n.d.). Radio advertising has quite a lot of disadvantages too. Just like magazine, Radio is not good for mass marketing, as it focuses on segment of market (Fill, et al., 2013). Another big problem with this is that if listeners don't like a particular song and the advertisement was to come in that song; they switch the channel and therefore miss out on advertisement (Neha, 2011). Furthermore, there is a lot of background noise in radio advertisement; like background music, listeners doing their chores (Ian, n.d.). Regardless, of these disadvantages many small businesses use radio advertisement as their paid touchpoint.

There are a number of other aspects of traditional advertising that are also forms of paid touchpoints. They include brand written promotional clothing, promotional pens, calendars, writing pads and company cars with brand advertising to name a few.

The communication objective for advertising is typically for consumers to learn about the brand and the company and be informed about what can be offered to them. These more traditional forms are slowly declining as everything is online, through the digital platform.

=== Social media use ===
Social media is a marketing channel used as a touchpoint to reach a wide audience. Managing a brand through social media involves maintaining its reputation, addressing negative feedback, and using new touchpoints to build brand awareness and consumer engagement.

As consumers are continually engaging with technology, the expectations of a company or brand have been altered. Some marketers view social media as a way of providing promotional messages and offers to potential consumers. However, social media such as Facebook, is envisioned to be a platform connecting friends and colleagues worldwide. Social media is a way for companies to communicate their brand to consumers.

Research shows the most frequently used social media digital touchpoints are Instagram, Twitter at 96 percent, Facebook at 94 percent and LinkedIn at 83 per cent. All touchpoints on social media have a high level of interaction and communication between the company and the consumer, through the ability to post and respond directly to comments. Ninety-two percent of companies have created a Facebook page, and companies that create multiple posts of both information and promotional material maintain a high interaction with their consumers. Through social media touchpoints the opportunity for a two-way conversation with customers can develop allowing the company to gain customer feedback instantly and monitor customer satisfaction. This two-way interaction is becoming a co-creative process where consumers are encouraged to relay feedback of their preferences and experiences of a brand for the company's consideration and comparison to improve their existing advertising of that brand. However, if a company is not consistently active on social media this can lead to a high level of customer created content. This can result in both positive and negative outcomes as social media is great for networking a product, but negative comments can turn consumers against a product or brand.

== Consumer decision-making process ==
All touchpoints are tools brands can influence consumers either directly or indirectly throughout the consumer decision making process.

The consumer decision making process can be categorized into three key stages: pre-purchase, purchase and post-purchase.

At each of these stages a brand has a number of opportunities to use various strategies with touchpoints to expose their brand and influence a consumer's behavior in the decision-making process.

=== Pre-purchase stage ===
The pre-purchase stage is where consumers first come into contact with a brand, either consciously (like seeing an ad) or subconsciously (like noticing a logo). This is the crucial first impression where marketing plays a vital role in introducing a brand and planting a seed of interest.

This stage is where we use advertising and marketing to make a mark. A variety of traditional and modern marketing channels are available, including:

- Websites: Serving as a digital storefront, a well-designed website is often the first marketing tool a consumer encounters.
- Direct Mail and Samples: Tangible items like product samples or mailers are classic marketing strategies that create a memorable impression.
- Email Campaigns and Rewards: Personalized emails offering discounts or incentives are proven marketing tactics to drive engagement.
- Coupons, Incentives, Deals, and Promotions: Limited-time marketing offers grab attention and encourage immediate action.

In an increasingly complex and crowded marketplace, small businesses must carefully consider their marketing strategies to connect with their audience without getting lost in the noise. For example, a small coffee shop might use marketing tools like social media ads paired with a local coupon drop to ensure visibility both online and offline.

With advertising overload and shrinking attention spans, small businesses face marketing challenges. By combining strategic storytelling, consistent messaging, and targeted marketing campaigns, small businesses can create connections with potential customers.

=== Purchase stage ===
At this stage the consumer has decided to purchase the product or service but the consumer decision making process is not complete.

Touchpoint may influence sales and brand reputation

Touchpoints at the purchase stage include Sales agent or person, store placement, packaging and the point of sale.

- A sales agent has the ability to up sell or provide the consumer with more knowledge of what they are selling.
- Store placement or placement of touchpoints is key as a brand wants to be seen by consumers before they come into contact with another brand.

The consumer wants to easily locate what they are looking for or they could be exposed to a brand and their product or service that they have not thought about before.

- Packaging: Packaging of a product or the way brand conveys its image should represent a brand and its product or service. Similar to placement, packaging needs to capture consumer attention in a way that will encourage them to purchase that brand over another.

As the market changes and evolves, brands must maintain a balance in the need to maintain familiar with consumers as well as the need to remain relevant due to constant change. When redesigning brands must be clear about who they want to attract and also remain consistent with the image they wish to portray.

- Loyalty programs give consumers an incentive to return and purchase more of a brand's product if they know they will be rewarded. Physical loyalty cards are being replaced with electronic systems. This enables rewards for the consumer without them having to go out of their way, creating a customer service experience that is hassle free and beneficial.
- Newsletters: Allow a business to keep in touch with their customers’ post purchase and inform them of other products and services they have to offer. This continuation of contact will help create a lifelong relationship between the brand and the consumer.
- Performance of the product/service: The quality of a brands product or service after the purchase reflects the brands image and could determine whether the consumer will return to purchase from that brand again. It is vital as interlinks back to pre-purchase stage, word of mouth, as consumers will share their feedback with others, positive or negative.

== Effective use of touchpoints ==
Four steps to guide businesses to implement touchpoints effectively to have a successful effect in the market.

- Identify the most important customers.
- Concentrate investment on the customer touchpoints that will do the most to raise profitable demand.
- Set realistic goals for implementation.
- Constantly revisit their performance.

In a fast-changing and evolving market, marketers face the challenge of choosing what touchpoints to invest in and in what media channels. Research has examined various touchpoints such as, brand advertising, retailer touchpoints, word-of-mouth, and traditional earned touchpoints separately.

Focusing on strategic touchpoints helps brands align consumer interactions with marketing goals on by coordinating messaging and experiences across different channels.

== Sensory cues ==
Research into marketing and advertising has found that brands' touchpoints can connect with people consciously or more often sub-consciously. The use of sensory cues is used in advertising to engage consumers on a sub conscious level.

In a complex and over-crowded marketplace, the consumer decision making process is also becoming more complex. Brands must think in a more innovative way in order to effectively engage and connect with consumers, to remain competitive and stand out from their competitors. A strategy that is becoming more researched and used by marketing teams is the use of sensory cues in advertising and marketing.

There is an increased awareness in the emotional effect of marketing through advertising, branding, product experience and packaging this emotional effect often takes advantage of the non-conscious shopper during the consumer decision making process, manipulating the consumer without them realizing.

People use their senses to connect with the world, much like how brands use touchpoints to connect with consumers. By using sensory characteristics brands are able to connect with consumers in way consumers are unaware of.

Brands have sensory characteristics, e.g., shapes, feels, sounds, colors and smells that they can use to influence consumers’ emotions, therefore purchasing behavior. These characteristics allow brands to cue consumers’ emotions on a sub-conscious level.

Brands can incorporate this into their brands image and their products.

For example,

- Yellow evokes thoughts of happiness, light, excitement.
- Brown: Earthy, nature and could be used effectively to promote organic products.
- White: Pure, clean, associated with products such as washing powder and soap.

Used effectively a consumer then will associate these senses with a brand and feel a sense of familiarity when these senses are ignited.

== Seven key touchpoints for customer experience ==
Touchpoints can simply be broken up into seven different elements: atmospheric, technological, communicative, process, employee to customer interactions, customer to customer interactions and, product interactions (Stein, & Ramaseshan, 2016). Although there are seven elements, the customer can be experiencing more than one at a time, for example: on the phone to the business about the product while browsing the businesses website. This puts the customer experiencing all touchpoints apart from customer to customer, this shows the importance of ensuring customers experiences with the business are positive throughout every aspect.

=== Atmospheric elements ===
Atmospheric covers all aspects of when a consumer comes into contact with the store physically or digitally, and will activate any of the consumer's senses, such as sight, sound, touch, and smell. Some atmospheric elements that need to be considered for physical stores are Store layout and design, Store displays, the overall attractiveness of the store, ambiance and amenities (Stein, & Ramaseshan, 2016). For websites or mobile phone apps it is important to have an attractive, easy to use layout that will appeal to the businesses target audience (Xu, Peak, & Prybutok, 2015).

=== Technological elements ===
Technological touchpoints cover the ease of use of the technology and also the convenience of it, as well as self-service technology (Stein, & Ramaseshan, 2016). The technological side of businesses are becoming ever increasingly important, to a business are the overall success of it (MacDonald, Wilson, & Konus, 2012). As well as having up to date technology it is important for the business to use the technology to their advantage when sending out surveys or questionnaires to their target markets, by using tools such as social media and mobile phone apps it keeps the business evolving with the consumers (MacDonald et al., 2012). Technological touchpoints can be when a consumer is using a self-service checkout within the store, using the businesses mobile phone app/ website, or any other interactive displays within the store (Stein, & Ramaseshan, 2016).

=== Communicative elements ===
Communicative elements focus on a promotional message, informative message and advertisement (Stein, & Ramaseshan, 2016). These messages are often used as a one-way communication channel from the business to the customer, it can include both promotional and informative information (Stein, & Ramaseshan, 2016). It can be received in the forms of: email flyers, messages via texts, advertising on the television or radio, physical flyers and telephone calls (Stein, & Ramaseshan, 2016). You can measure how affective these campaigns are through Integrated Marketing Communications (IMC) which measures the brands market performance as well as the businesses financial performance as a result of communicative elements to see how it haw aided the business (Luxton, Reid, & Mavondo, 2015).

Communicating and building customer awareness and knowledge of a product or service is often centered on brand communication. Brand communication and the way customers connect with a brand are now in fundamentally new and changing ways, often through social media channels that are beyond businesses control. The communication of brands can be defined as the interactions and exposures that customers can have with the brand called touchpoints. Brand touchpoints include deliberate communications generated by the business but also interactions the customer have with the brand throughout their everyday life.

According to Fripp, G. (2013) the brand touchpoints for service-based businesses, who may only distribute their products and services through their staff or a call center, are their contact staff themselves. For businesses with their own retail/service outlets, the facilities of the store are the brand touchpoint facilitating multiple touchpoints such as, signage, environment, aesthetics, atmosphere and interaction with staff and product. These brand touchpoints able to be generated deliberately by the business. Non-brand communications are brand touchpoints are often not able to be generated by the business but are created through customer interactions with the brand through social media, blogs, video/TV media and individual customer reviews and communication. Non-brand touchpoints can also include observations, seeing the brand used by others or prior use of the brand, word-of-mouth, research online and product placement.

Today customers communicate and connect with brands by expanding the pool of options before narrowing it and after purchasing remain engaged with the brand, collaborating in the brands development. (Edelma, D, C. 2010) recognizes that what has changed and is constantly changing is when and at what touchpoints they are most open to influence and how they interact with those points. Through research, Edelma, D, C. (2010) discovered that today's customers take a more iterative and less reductive purchase journey of four stages: consider, evaluate, buy, and enjoy, advocate, bond. Communication touchpoints within this journey consistently change as the customer's consideration of brands change. As they evaluate their purchase they often reduce their choices, then they evaluate those choices of brand, often expanding their options as they seek input from peers, reviewers, retailers, and competitors. Their own research is more likely to shape their ensuing choices then the marketers push to persuade them. Customers often put off the purchase decision until in store, thus the points of purchase; product placement, packaging, availability, pricing and sales interaction, are evermore powerful touchpoints. After purchasing the customer often continues to interact with the product, forming deeper connections through new online touchpoints. Often conducting online research after purchasing the customer, if pleased, will advocate the product or service by word-of–mouth, reviews and so may bond, entering an enjoy-advocate-buy loop that skips the consider and evaluate stages.

Referred to as the customer decision journey, business marketers should now work towards targeting these touchpoint stages and create a plan that will make the customer experience coherent and even extend the boundaries of the brand itself. Spenglar, C (2008) analysed that around a third of brand experience is based on personal recommendations, word-of-mouth, editorials, online communities and social media. Revealing that brand experience communication methods are most important and that flexibility and thus change, providing space for creative lateral thinking while developing touchpoints and planning new solutions, are more important than sustainability in today's brand and market management.

=== Process elements ===
Process elements look at the process for the customer to get a product and the availability of the product, specifically: waiting time, navigation and service process (Stein, & Ramaseshan, 2016). Waiting time can be while the customer is in store, waiting in line to check out or even purchase a coffee/wait for it to be made, but it also includes virtual checkouts, delivery, how long you are on hold with on the phone (Stein, & Ramaseshan, 2016). Navigation and service look at the accessibility and ease for the consumer to get around the store, both virtual and brick and mortar stores. It can also come down to how easy the business has made the process of returning goods, whether they are faulty, wrong size, or if the customer has simply decided they no longer want it (Stein, & Ramaseshan, 2016).

From when a customer first discovers a product to the time of purchasing it, they will encounter a vast ray of experiences with the product or brand. According to Westernberg, E (2010) consumers touch the brand an average of 56 times between inspiration and transaction. While many of these interactive touchpoints still involve walking by the store front, going online to the website, TV ads or radio, more and more social media touchpoints such as networking communities, blogs, Facebook and Instagram are an integral part of the purchase journey.

Businesses are now realizing they must find ways to differentiate their brands amidst a variety of consumer touchpoints throughout their purchase journey. Westernberg, E (2010) states that market leaders are using touchpoints to listen to their customers and are working to develop new services that help them earn ownership of the customer experience. They use social media to listen, to engage, to offer services and to interact through platforms that enhance the brand and customer experience, to keep them coming back. Traditionally businesses have developed their customer experience touchpoints by communicating their brand and services through channels they control; the shop, the phone, events, their website. Now, however there is a shift towards new touchpoints that are completely independent of the business owner; social net working such as Facebook, blogs, mobile apps, Twitter, Instagram, location based services and many more.

With these services, clients find product information, customer preferences and advertising data. The incorporation of Apps with GPS locations that can now display popular restaurants nearby and connect details of products and pricing, consumer opinions, comments, and destination selection. The development of new touchpoint opportunities is accelerated by new technology such as, augmented reality (AR), near field communications, IPTV and sixth sense technology. The challenge for businesses is to keep up to date, engaged, understand, make choices and respond to the touchpoint opportunities evolving. (Westernberg, E. 2010).

Richardson, A (2010), states that taking the time to look at touchpoints as a collective whole, would help shape a better customer experience and even point to opportunities to invent new types of touchpoints. It may reveal that some touchpoints are overly reliant on third parties who are not upholding their part of the customer experience. When Apple got fed up with retailers not doing a good enough job in communicating the Mac experience, it opened up its own stores, which is now a key reason why Apple is now able to attract a broader customer base. To analyze touchpoints requires multiple parts of a business to work together to improve the customer experience. Although hard to do and often more reflective of the business organizational chart than they are of an ideal experience, accomplishing a measure of integration will enable a customer experience that has competitive durability and customer enthusiasm and loyalty.

=== Employee-customer interaction ===
The interaction between employees and customers can be considered another important touchpoint. This is because, during such an interaction, there is a need for employees to create a sense of trust between themselves and the customers. Regardless of whether or not a customer has made a decision to purchase, and depending on the level of the employees’ customer service, the interaction between themselves and the employees of a brand can create a more gratifying (or terrible) experience for the customer. Employees of all brands can adopt Robert B. Cialdini's principles of persuasion in order to create a bond between themselves and the customers that may result in the customer's decision to purchase. Cialdini states that there are 6 principles of persuasion when it comes to the consumer's decision making process: Reciprocation, commitment and consistency, social proof, liking, authority and scarcity. The use of such principles is at the discretion of the employee when dealing with a customers during the buying process. The interaction between employees and customers as a touchpoint is vital in the sense that employees have the opportunity to get to know their customers and be able to grasp what is important to them as a consumer of their brand. Once such a distinction can be made, the customer will have a sense of belonging to the brand or rather, trust of the brand and as a result, a purchase decision will be made.

Employee customer touchpoints offer employees the opportunity to listen and better understand their customer's needs and wants. Westernberg, E. (2010) suggest that through the pathways of interaction through social media, web searches and mobile apps, consumers are leaving fingerprints on many touchpoints, such as when they seek information or visit a specific destination. This presents the following opportunities for the employee; firstly they will know what the consumer is going to look for and be the first to offer it to him or her. Secondly is the opportunity to increase the importance of the brand by making life better and easier for the consumer. By enabling the customer to interact with the business experience through social networking, they allow their customer to share their ideas, questions and suggestions. Employees ability to create positive customer interactions, hinges on being able to respond quickly and appropriately to the customers experience.

According to N. Friedman (2016) there are seven touchpoints of communication; telephone, e-mail, voice mail, mail, fax, face-to-face and instant messaging. The touchpoints of each of these interactions need to convey a consistent business voice. Communications via telephone is known as a “synchronous” method, meaning you are in “sync” with the person, requiring no waiting. The best part about communicating through telephone is the ability to hear the tone of voice, having the ability to have effective and positive interactions. Email is “asynchronous”, meaning you communicative one at a time and do not get an immediate response, this relinquishes the interpretation of tone of voice. Standards around emailing processes need to be established within a business frame-work to avoid miss-communication, they need to be kept up to date, attended to, be well mannered and convey the voice of the business. Voice mail also uses tone of voice and needs to be to the point, ask a question and get an answer. Mail and fax again “asynchronous”, one-way information, are methods that are phasing out, but similar to emails where miss communication needs to be avoided. Face-to-face communication has it all; sight, sound, tone of voice, facial expressions and body language, it is a “asynchronous” touchpoint and yet miss-communications can occur. Instant messaging is a method of communication that is growing in use and appeal but again awareness around its best use, communication delivery and interpretation is vital.

Richardson, A (2010) defines the importance of the touchpoints behind employee and customer interaction, as the ability of businesses to speak to customers with the same tone, the same message and even the same words to communicate consistently and effectively. Businesses need to asks and address the questions; are the touchpoints addressing customer motivation, answering questions, working for your target market, meeting their needs, differentiating from their competitors and helping to retain the customer.

=== Customer-customer interaction ===
In the customer realm, when it comes down to deciding whether to use a service or purchase from a brand, it can be said that the consumer evaluates brand alternatives and ranks them from the most preferred to the least preferred and forms ‘purchase intentions’. However, there are two factors that influence the consumer's actual decision to purchase. Such factors are the ‘attitudes of others’ and the ‘unexpected situational factors’. With regard to interaction between customers, the factor that is relevant to such a situation is the ‘attitudes of others’. During the pre-purchase stage of a consumer's decision making process, the consumer searches for information about a certain product from a variety of brands. An effective touchpoint during this search for information is experiences from other consumers of a brand whether it be from family and friends, or even reviews online via internet search or social media. Internet searches, (whether the consumer is conscious of it or not), are indirect interactions between customers that ultimately define and determine a consumer's purchase decision. However, it is when a customer receives information about a product from someone important to them, that they truly take that information on board. For example, if a consumer recognizes a need for a new car, they seek advice or information from a family member or friend. In doing so, the family member or friend may advise them to buy the cheaper car out of all available options because it is just as efficient as the expensive car. This then lowers the chance of the consumer choosing the more expensive car. This emphasizes the point that a lot of the consumer's decision making can be based on experiences other consumers have had with certain brands, creating this crucial touchpoint of customer to customer interaction.

=== Product interaction ===
Product interaction is when a consumer comes into contact with a businesses physical product, whether it be directly or indirectly (Stein, & Ramaseshan, 2016). Product interaction involves: quality of the product(s), assortment of products, direct and indirect interactions with the product (Stein, & Ramaseshan, 2016). When customers start interacting with a product, it gives them tangible evidence about the good and whether it meets the perceived value, from the pre-purchase stage. If the product does not meet expectations, the business overall could be viewed in a negative way and vice vera (Cassia, Ugolini, Cobelli, & Gill, 2015). Businesses should also ensure that they have a large assortment of the goods available, in-store or otherwise, this can means have a large range of sizes for clothing, and a large number of each size, or even having an item in differing colors to give the customers options (Cassia et al., 2015).

In developing a product businesses should do more than identify needed features. It should also design for experiences, after observing how customers interact with the product and service, why they use them and analyze how existing products might be frustrating them. Meyer, C., & Schwager, A. (2007) recognize that ideally product development will identify customer behavior that may run counter to the businesses expectations and discover needs that haven't been identified yet. Although businesses know a lot about their customers buying habits, they know little about the thoughts, emotions and states of mind that customers interaction with products induce. Kaplan, A. (2006) discovers how marketers are using product packaging to connect with customer emotions. He identifies there are seven different ways product packaging can be used to create positive touchpoint experiences. Human touch; used to create deeper relationships with the customer, by connecting with customer's interests and aspirations. Spiritual touch; used to connect with different areas of customer life style, heritage and culture. Physical touch; meaning the actual physical sensation packaging can provide. Personal touch; where customers are able to interact and contribute to their own personalized designs. Ritual touch; where the packaging lends itself to a customer's unique experience and use. Mental touch; the state of mind people bring, influenced by environment, trends and life style. Finally, grounding touch; where customers want to believe in something that is real, so the product needs to be honest and authentic, where it tells a story in a very honest and well-designed way.

== Application area ==
Return on Investment-oriented management aims to augment and optimize the effect and cost-benefit ratio of internal and external processes. As of 2011 a single communication channel seldom provides high-impact reach to all target-persons. This includes customer relationship management, buying and selling channels, distribution, service, internal and external communication, human resource management, and process-optimization programs. Transactions take place across multiple divisions and touchpoints that span the whole value chain of a company. For example, transactions may be made through classic advertising, intranet, or call centers, or through sales staff at the point of sale. Precise measurements taken at all touchpoints, accompanied by a systematic management of them, leads to an impact-oriented performance improvement of a brand's management.

== Touchpoint analysis ==
The benefit of touchpoint analysis is that, while comprehending all relevant media and departments, it filters and measures all the relevant contact points from the target customer's view. Touchpoint management allows companies to optimize all the interactions with the existing and potential customers, the internal communications and process management.

=== Example: touchpoints of a bank ===
A customer may have numerous touchpoints with a bank, including client service advisors, statements, promotional events, products, financial expert reports, website, intranet, IT-systems, research reports, sponsoring, word of mouth, e-banking, call centers, etc.

=== Which touchpoints are relevant for success? ===
With often over a hundred touchpoints identifiable within larger companies, the key question is: Which of these are relevant for the company's success? Analysis and assessment is undertaken on the nature and impact (for example, on brand management) of specific touchpoints. The touchpoints which are relevant for a company's success will vary by multiple factors including industry, product, service, target segment, etc.

From the overall interface landscape, central touchpoints can be identified, analyzed and assessed. Such analysis enables companies to evaluate their processes, measures and engagements more holistically: future assets and budgets may be better aligned and applied to deliver a more sustainable contribution to the success of the company.

=== Touchpoint categories ===
Across all industries touchpoints can be divided into paid (classical push media with advertising messages), owned (companies own marketing instruments, sales consultations, website, brochures, etc.) and earned ones (test reports, recommendations by customers, etc.).

Paid, owned and earned touchpoints now flow through multiple channels and the message can be two-way. The proliferation of digital channels has now influenced owned and earned touchpoints to be considered in sync with traditional paid channels (Pessin & Weaver, 2014). The category of paid touchpoints used to be considered the most frequently used channel of media. But people now expect various multichannel, multi-device experiences and have the ability to choose their channels to interact with a brand. This is achieved through using the same funds more effectively across paid channels, taking into account the interactions with owned and earned channels which drive better business outcomes, particularly sales (Pessin & Weaver, 2014). Media no longer remains about just paid or traditional touchpoints; it is about manifolds of experiences across paid, owned and earned channels (Frampton, 2015). In current days society earned media is preferred over paid and owned media. That is not to lessen the importance of the other two; paid and owned media channels should be distinguished to create engaging customer experiences. In a recent study, ‘84 percent of millennials reported that they "didn't like" advertising and trusted their closest friends nearly twice as much as sales messages’ (Instead Articles, 2015). Sponsored content is a form of advertising brands use to strengthen credibility, but the tactic has not been very successful. The introduction of social media advertising has blurred the line between earned and paid approaches of media (Instead Articles, 2015). A campaign, which used owned assets within its strategy, was Coca-Cola. Featuring smaller 250 ml Coke cans, which came in limited edition range of colours, which could be collected and shared. The campaign had a connected system of touchpoints, which supplied the opportunity to unlock the can to gain a vast world of content, experiences and prizes; leading to twenty seven percent sales increase above forecast (PR Newswire, 2015).

By using touchpoints, a company can discover the many different opportunities for its brand to be positively maintained or negatively expressed. Each activity goes with the three touchpoint experience categories: pre-purchase, purchase, and post-purchase.

Pre-purchase experience touchpoints defines the many ways potential consumers can connect with a brand before deciding whether or not to do business with a company. Some pre-purchase touchpoints normally used by companies include web sites, word-of-mouth, direct mail, research, sponsorships, public relations and advertising. The design of each of these pre-purchase touchpoint interactions should not only be to mold the perceptions and expectations of the brand but to increase brand awareness and influence its relevance. And at the same time, helping potential consumers understand why this brand is better than competing brands and the value the brand delivers in satisfying their needs and wants. As the pre-purchase experience for potential consumers is examined, the brand should focus on improving the touchpoints that will encourage consumers, in the most effective and efficient way, to put the brand into consideration.

Purchase (or usage) experience touchpoints refers to those that moves a customer from only thinking about a company's brand to buying a product or service and commencing a consumer-brand relationship. Purchase touchpoints that companies use include but is not limited to direct field sales, stores and face to face contact with customer representatives. The purpose of these touchpoints of interaction is to increase the value that consumers see in what the brand is offering and to ensure them that have chosen the right brand. During these interactions, it is essential to engender trust into the consumers’ minds by proving without a doubt that what a company is offering is far better than those of the opposition.

Post-purchase experience touchpoints are used after the sale of the brand, the product, and or service, and to enhance customer experience with the brand. Post-purchase touchpoints can include loyalty programs, customer satisfaction surveys, warranty and rebate activities, regular maintenance, and reminders about the brand's innovations on its products or services. Even though these touchpoints offer brand-development opportunities, and the chance for businesses to enhance sustainable and profitable growth, they are ignored at most times. Post-purchase experience touchpoints aim to deliver the brand promise, to satisfy or exceed customer performance and usage expectations, and to build brand loyalty and advocacy towards the brand.

There are significant long-term benefits in evaluating a brand's touchpoints. It can help keep the brand's relevance in the minds of its users, while also building a strong and powerful brand. Utilizing touchpoints is very important as George (2003) explains, in which it fully allows an organization to extensively monitor the crucial consumer to brand interactions.

== Brand encounters ==
A brand encounter is where the brand and the consumer meet, and the consumer forms an opinion of the business or organization that has been encountered. Where brand encounters are beneficial is when the business or organization wants consumers to form a good opinion of them, to create repeat business (Dahlen, Lange & Smith, 2010).

- Explicit brand encounters: an explicit brand encounter is where the company or organization has planned the encounter and it has a specific purpose, this can be an encounter such as a poster or a billboard (Dahlen et al., 2013). It is where they are trying to send a clear direct message to the potential consumer. With an explicit brand encounter there doesn't tend to be any room for an emotional underlying message to be made about the brand.
- Implicit brand encounters: implicit brand encounters are indirect ways a company sends a message to the consumer about the brand. These can be ways such as packaging and pricing. Packaging is a way that brands can communicate to their consumers about who they are and what they stand for (Dahlen et al., 2013). The average human takes around seven seconds to create a first impression of something so packaging of products is an effective way to communicate to your consumer (Law, 2013). By having sleek, and clean lines and consistent packaging throughout their product range Apple have conveyed the message of classiness to the consumer, and that is before they have even opened the box. The brands that make the most sales have tended to be the brands that have taken the biggest risks with new and edgy ways of packaging their products (Law, 2013). The price of a product is also a way the company sends messages to the consumer. Where you set your price relays where in the market you want to be and who you want your consumers to be. Once again with Apple, they have also set their prices high and this implicitly communicates it is for the more discerning shopper, or someone who wants a higher quality good. Store ambience and layout is also a way messages are sent to the consumer. Clean, uncluttered stores with bright white lighting or illumination can show classiness, even if the pricing differs from the initial opinion formed.
- Solicited brand encounters: a solicited brand encounter is specific and you went out and looked for the brand. It can also be described as a planned brand encounter (Dahlen et al., 2013). This can be going online and looking at the companies website, or through a third party such as at a shopping centre. Solicited brand encounters allow for some control from the company but if it is somewhere such as a supermarket companies have to allow for a degree of uncontrollability. A company that has controlled how their brand is seen through third parties is Coca-Cola. By creating and supplying their own fridges they have control of how the consumer interacts with the brand. By doing this it gives little room for error on how their products are stocked and who stocks them (Dahlen et al.,. 2013). This is also effective for introducing new products because it means third parties cannot move it around, or even not stock it. It allows for the company to have control over how the third party controls the stocking and promotion of new products. Companies advertising and promoting their products at the tills in supermarkets is also a way of soliciting a brand encounter, as they place their products in a position you cannot miss, and usually accompanied by bright colours or other enticing cues to attract the consumer to the product.
- Unsolicited brand encounters: an unsolicited brand encounter is where brands are seen and discussed but without the brands message being conveyed (Dahlen et al., 2013). These can be on platforms such as blogs or social media. These are encounters you didn't go and seek out, but more stumbled across and are unplanned. This type of brand encounter is one companies can struggle with as there is potential for mass media to get the wrong message about a product or service, especially if a key opinion former has a bad experience with a product or service, the bad encounter can reach a large number of people without them directly looking for the opinion. There is very little control available for unsolicited brand encounters, and with platforms such as Facebook and Twitter it means even small people who have little influence on others can say things about a brand, or a campaign and it can go much further than initially anticipated. Viral videos are an example of an unsolicited brand encounter because more often than not these just appear on things such as a Facebook newsfeed. Unlike a solicited brand encounter, these types of encounter are not specific and not direct. Ways that companies can try combat this is by releasing their own material, or replicating original advertisements (Dahlen et al., 2013) to once again try get their original message for the brand out to consumers.

=== Tools ===
A number of tools are available to analyze specific touchpoints. Yet it is still a challenge to compare all the different contact points. New tools – like the Live Experience Tracking (LET) – capture key online and offline touchpoints. In addition to frequently examined contact points such as advertising and sponsoring, it also details store visits, sales force and PR contacts. Moreover, it collects recommendations received and given (word-of-mouth). The result: all touchpoints are in one "currency".

=== Neuro-tools ===
The increased use of touchpoints across a variety of communication channels has resulted in development of neuroscience and behavioral economics, to advance emotional and experiential consumer connections (Noble, 2016). Emotional customer connections are prompted by sensory characteristics, with the alignment of touchpoints in order for brands to develop beyond mediocrity. An example is herbal essences (a hair product brand), which focuses on the sensorial experience of smell, associating emotionally with indulgence and sensuality (Bailey, 2015). Experiential consumer connections aim to create a bond or strong brand association with a consumer through a particular experience. Traditionally consumption relates to a goal-orientated activity in which someone purchases a product because it benefits him or her. This shopping orientation has been replaced with a strong desire for experiential benefits, affecting consumption emotionally and cognitively. This then leads to higher satisfaction and shows more positive loyalty intentions (Shoberiri, Rajaobelina, Duff, & Boivin, 2016). Neuro-tools are used to help distinguish which touchpoint were used and why. The holistic approach creates a model shift, not only using neuro-tools but also through creating an integrated testing mechanism, which maps out the contribution each touchpoint makes within a campaign and the nature of the touchpoint. Implementation of the approach can be modified to fit into typically difficult areas to evaluate. These include telecoms and financial services, FMCG brands, fragrance, health and beauty as well as leisure and entertainment. This approach is a three step sequence, all relating to the implicit tool. The first step is defining the overarching experience, which aims to pinpoint specific goals, helping to differentiate the brand from its competitors at a non-conscious level. Secondly it benchmarks specific touchpoints through evaluating them against the experiential template, emphasizing the contribution of each touchpoint over the entire experience. Lastly it maps and tracks relative contributions through touchpoints on the experiential template.

=== Touchpoint interaction benefits ===
Both parties of the communication partnership can gain through touchpoint interactions. The brand is able to understand the consumer better, be able to deliver more brand messages, and can improve the involvement with consumers while the consumers can get experiential value, brand satisfaction, and their needs satisfied.

A company is able to better meet the desires and wants of consumers through the feedback they receive. The feedback is used to guide customer satisfaction and administer consumer insight. This in turn gives consumers an overall better and improved brand experience. Second, the company can benefit from touchpoints as it aids in the investment of marketing communications by increasing message delivery and decreasing negative messages that can invalidate the marketing communications messages. And the customer benefits by assisting in the progress of two-way communication, which helps when something goes wrong, as it can be easily remedied through communication between the entities. Lastly, the company gains leverage in interactive experiences to boost brand awareness, brand associations, anticipated quality of the brand, and brand loyalty. In turn, the consumers benefit from gaining brand insurance. The risk in purchasing a product and using it is reduced or eliminated because of the increase of brand trust.

Overall, by taking advantage of the uses and types of touchpoints, the company/brand and the consumer gain benefits as long as the communication is there.

== Touchpoint management ==
Touchpoint management can be seen as a multi-disciplinary strategic approach, which focuses on the optimisation of the performance in all internal and market oriented management divisions. Normally companies manage their touchpoints in different areas such as marketing, distribution, communication, service, public relations, investor relations or human resources. Due to specialisation, it involves the challenge of developing the contact points in a 360 degree view, which would enable a consistent brand experience over all interfaces and would simultaneously keep all the brand's promises. For an efficient and consistent brand management and the buildup of a distinctive brand experience, it is important to integrate the formal, content and time aspects of the communication activities.

Touchpoint management allows for successful marketing and sales management in businesses as they can seek the strengths and weaknesses within the operations. Examples of this are lost and past customers, as contacting of these people allows information on why they moved to another brand or what did not satisfy them in their purchase experience. Contacting prospect and future customers is another way to seek strengths and weaknesses as they can provide information through surveys and word of mouth on their thinking towards the brand and their thoughts on the competition in the neighboring fields. Current customers can give straightforward information and insight into what they find satisfactory about the product or service and what needs improvement. Businesses can find out why these current customers have remained loyal to the brand and how they can continue to enhance customer satisfaction. (Longoria S. D., 2003 )

Managing a consumers experience with a company has a greater effect on a company's market value than the company's ability to produce and trade (Baxendale, Macdonald, Wilson, 2015). Planning and managing consumer feedback that firms gain from a range of touchpoints can be critical to the success of a brand. This is a very strategic method that businesses use to develop and maintain a relationship with their particular consumers. With features such as in-store touchpoints, a business is able to promote its new brand or product allowing the consumer to engage with the item physically encouraging them to purchase the item or brand (Baxendale, Macdonald, Wilson, 2015).

Brand Touchpoint Management (BTM) is a modern management tool which begins with identifying and evaluating brand touchpoints (Gabriel, 2010). This method allows brand managers to set up a system in which they can enhance customer experience which gives a competitive edge within their target market. With the increase in innovative technology, brands now have the ability to communicate through many channels and have to consider which methods to use as effective touchpoints. Brands are constantly building a reputation that separates them from others that produce similar products. By using the touchpoints in the most effective channels they are able to create a relationship with consumers appealing to the entire target market and enhancing the brands reputation.

Touchpoints can be seen in, Marketing, Advertising, Retailing and Sales (MARS), which shows all the variety of channels in which they can be used. All areas are taken into account when managers set up their touchpoint channels with such an integrated approach to create and manage customer experience.

Marketing: a customer is introduced to a brand through the touchpoint which allows consumers to gain information and become educated about the brands product or service (Duncan, Moriarty, 2006).

Advertising: media coverage through television or websites are major touchpoints in this modern era of technology, with the presence of social media apps and constant growth of online shopping. Advertising gives brand managers the channel to create touchpoints for the majority of the demographics in each household.

Retailing: retail stores have strategically placed products or advertisements in key positions with the stores layout being a very vital touchpoint. Managing the layout of the store can be a vital point in whether or not items are sold or a service is purchased (Jain, Bagdare, 2009).

Sales: Within business to consumer companies sales are the transaction touchpoint where a business and consumer both agree on a terms of trade. Consumers can be retained if this touchpoint is managed well and the experience of the customers’ transaction was pleasant (Bhattacherjee, 2001). For example, if a customer is satisfied with a service from a Coke-a-cola outlet they may return rather than switch to a Pepsi outlet. This brand rivalry can be beneficial for consumers as it encourages brands to provide the best service or product available.

== Literature ==
=== General ===
- Axel Puhlmann: Alle Berührungspunkte mit der Marke zählen! Content published in: planung & analyse, nr. 3/2013, online: https://web.archive.org/web/20150404053634/https://www.conoscenti.com/pdf/FD_Puhlmann.pdf
- Axel Puhlmann: Reaching Customers Where IT Really Matters. Content published in: p&a international market research, nr. 2/2013, online: https://web.archive.org/web/20150402192934/https://www.conoscenti.com/pdf/Artikel_pA_CustomerJourney.pdf
- Spengler, C., Wirth, W. (2009): 360° Touchpoint analysis: Maximising the impact of marketing and sales activities. Content published in: io new management (Ed. ETH Zurich/Axel Springer Switzerland), nr. 3/2009, online: https://web.archive.org/web/20150402150648/https://www.accelerom.com/en/wp-content/uploads/2012/10/2009_io-new-management_Maximising-the-impact-of-marketing-and-sales-activities.pdf
- Mueller, J., Spengler, C. (2008): Welcher Marken-Touchpoint zählt? In: Kaul, H., Steinmann, C. (Ed.): Community Marketing. Schaeffer-Poeschel, 2008. ISBN 978-3-7910-2757-9.

=== Customer touchpoint ===
- Christoph Spengler, Werner Wirth, Renzo Sigrist: 360-Degree-Touchpoint-Management – How important is twitter for our brand? Content published in: Marketing Review St. Gallen (Hrsg. Universität St. Gallen/Gabler Verlag, Springer Fachmedien), nr. 2/2010, online: https://web.archive.org/web/20140211035822/https://www.accelerom.com/en/wp-content/uploads/2012/10/2010_Marketing-Review_360-degree-Touchpoint-Management.pdf
- Christoph Spengler, Mona Issa: TV spot, PoS, Facebook & Co: What really works? Content published in: W&V Media GmbH, nr. 12/2010, online: https://web.archive.org/web/20150807084109/https://www.accelerom.com/en/wp-content/uploads/2012/10/2010_WuV_TV-Spots-PoS-Facebook-and-Co-What-really-works.pdf
- Christoph Spengler, Renzo Sigrist, Peter Sopp: Exploit innovation potential to the maximum Content published in: Swiss Innovation Guide 2011, online: https://web.archive.org/web/20150807084155/https://www.accelerom.com/en/wp-content/uploads/2012/11/2011_Handelszeitung_Exploit-innovation-potential-to-the-maximum.pdf
- Franzen, Giep, and Moriarty, Sandra (2009): The Science and Art of Branding. (M.E. Sharpe) ISBN 978-0-7656-1790-3.
- Spengler, C. (2008): The competitive advantage of a brand typical client experience In: Handelszeitung & The Wall Street Journal (33), online: https://web.archive.org/web/20160303233844/https://www.accelerom.com/en/wp-content/uploads/2012/10/2008_Handelszeitung_The-competitive-advantage-of-a-brandtypical-client-experience.pdf
