= Loyalty marketing =

Marketing strategy

Loyalty marketing is a marketing strategy in which a company focuses on growing and retaining existing customers through incentives. Branding, product marketing, and loyalty marketing all form part of the customer proposition – the subjective assessment by the customer of whether to purchase a brand or not based on the integrated combination of the value they receive from each of these marketing disciplines.

The discipline of customer loyalty marketing has been around for many years, but expansions from it, from merely being a model for conducting business to becoming a vehicle for marketing and advertising have made it omnipresent in consumer marketing organizations since the mid- to late-1990s. Some of the newer loyalty marketing industry insiders, such as Fred Reichheld, have claimed a strong link between customer loyalty marketing and customer referral. In recent years, a new marketing discipline called "customer advocacy marketing" has been combined with or replaced by "customer loyalty marketing." To the general public, many airline miles programs, hotel frequent guest programs, and credit card incentive programs are the most visible customer loyalty marketing programs.

== History ==
=== Retail merchandising ===
==== Premiums ====
Premiums are items that a retail customer can receive by redeeming proofs of purchase from a specific product or store. This was one of the first loyalty marketing programs.

==== Early premium programs ====
In 1793, a U.S. merchant started giving out copper tokens which could be collected by the consumer and exchanged for items in the store. This would be the first modern example of a loyalty marketing program; however, it is unclear whether these tokens were given out with the intended purpose of creating a loyalty program or simply to combat the coin shortage that existed during that time. The practice caught on and was used by many merchants throughout the 19th century. Sweet Home laundry soap, a product of the B. A. Babbit Company, came with certificates that could be collected and redeemed for color lithographs. Beginning in 1872, the Grand Union Tea Company gave tickets to customers that could be exchanged for merchandise in the company catalog of Grand Union stores. The company advertised this practice as "giving presents with our goods."

===== Trading stamps =====
The first trading stamps were introduced in 1891, the Blue Stamp Trading System, where stamps affixed to booklets could be redeemed for store products. The Sperry and Hutchinson Company, started in 1896 in Jackson, Michigan, was the first third-party provider of trading stamps for various companies, including dry goods dealers, gas stations and later supermarkets. S&H Green Stamps, as the company was commonly called, opened its first redemption center in 1897. Customers could take their filled booklets of "green stamps" and redeem them for household products, kitchen items, and personal items. When the G.I.s returned from World War II the trading stamps business took off when numerous third-party companies created their own trading stamp programs to offer to supermarkets and other retailers.

===== Marketing through children =====
Marketers of retail products used programs targeted at children to sell to their parents through the use of premiums. Kellogg's Corn Flakes had the first cereal premium with The Funny Jungleland Moving Pictures Book. The book was originally available as a prize that was given to the customer in the store with the purchase of two packages of the cereal. But in 1909, Kellogg's changed the book giveaway to a premium mail-in offer for the cost of a dime. Over 2.5 million copies of the book were distributed in different editions over a period of 23 years.

At the beginning of the Second World War, radio played a dominant role in the promotion and distribution of premiums, usually toys that were closely related to the radio program. Many radio shows offered premiums to their listeners, but Captain Midnight was one of the best known. The early sponsor of Captain Midnight was Skelly Oil, and parents could get forms to mail in for radio premiums at the gas stations. Later, Ovaltine became the sponsor of Captain Midnight, and it continued the premiums through advertising on the labels and foil tops of Ovaltine that could be collected to exchange for Captain Midnight premiums and offering membership to the "Secret Squadron".

===== Boxtops =====
In 1929, Betty Crocker issued coupons that could be used to redeem premiums like free flatware. In 1937 the coupons were printed on the outside of packages, and later the Betty Crocker points program produced a popular reward catalog from which customers could pick rewards using their points. In 2006, it was announced that the Betty Crocker Catalog was going out of business and that all points needed to be redeemed by December 15, 2006. With it, one of the longest loyalty programs ended a 77-year tradition.

==== Prizes ====
Prizes are promotional items—small toys, games, trading cards, collectables, and other small items of nominal value—found in packages of brand-name retail products (or available from the retailer at the time of purchase) that are included in the price of the product (at no extra cost) with the intent to boost sales.

===== Tobacco inserts =====
Some of the earliest prizes were cigarette cards — trade cards advertising the product (not to be confused with trading cards) that were inserted into paper packs of cigarettes as stiffeners to protect the contents. Allan and Ginter in the U.S. in 1886, and British company W.D. & H.O. Wills in 1888, were the first tobacco companies to print advertisements and, a couple of years later, lithograph pictures on the cards with an encyclopedic variety of topics from nature to war to sports — subjects that appealed to men who smoked. By 1900, there were thousands of tobacco card sets manufactured by 300 different companies. Following the success of cigarette cards, trade cards were produced by manufacturers of other products and included in the product or handed to the customer by the store clerk at the time of purchase. World War II put an end to cigarette card production due to limited paper resources, and after the war cigarette cards never really made a comeback. After that collectors of prizes from retail products took to collecting tea cards in the UK and bubble gum cards in the US.

===== Trade cards to trading cards =====
The first baseball cards were trade cards featuring the Brooklyn Atlantics produced in 1868 by Peck and Snyder, a sporting goods company that manufactured baseball equipment. In 1869, Peck and Snyder trade cards featured the first professional team, the Red Stockings. Most of the baseball cards around the beginning of the 20th century came in candy and tobacco products produced by such companies as Breisch-Williams confectionery company of Oxford, Pennsylvania, American Caramel Company, the Imperial Tobacco Company of Canada, and Cabañas, a Cuban cigar manufacturer. In fact it is a baseball set, known as the T-106 tobacco card set, distributed by the American Tobacco Company in 1909 that is considered by collectors to be the most popular set of cigarette cards. In 1933, Goudey Gum Company of Boston issued baseball cards with players biographies on the backs and was the first to put baseball cards in bubble gum. Bowman Gum of Philadelphia issued its first baseball cards in 1948 and became the biggest issuer of baseball cards from 1948 to 1952.

===== Modern packaged foods =====
The most famous use of prizes in the United States (and the word "prize" in this context) is Cracker Jack brand popcorn confection. Prizes have been inserted into every package of Cracker Jack continuously since 1912. W.K. Kellogg was the first to introduce prizes in boxes of cereal. The marketing strategy that he established has produced thousands of different cereal box prizes that have been distributed by the tens of billions. Frito-Lay is a world icon in the field of in-package prizes. Besides being the current owner of Cracker Jack, the U.S. popcorn confection brand known for the "Prize Inside", Frito-Lay also regularly includes tazos and tattoos in packages of Lay's chips worldwide. In parts of Latin America, Frito-Lay has even introduced a brand called Cheetos Sorpresa (English: Surprise), which includes a licensed prize (from movies, television, and video games) in every 29–gram bag.

=== Direct marketing pioneers ===
==== Ward: the father of mail order ====
Aaron Montgomery Ward's mail order catalog created a network that included mailing, mail order, telemarketing, and social media. Today, the mail order catalogue industry Montgomery founded is worth approximately 100 billion dollars, and generates over 2 trillion only in [incremental] sales and supports to this day an estimated 10.9 million jobs either directly related to the marketing industry or dependent upon it.

==== Wunderman: direct marketing genius ====
Mail order pioneer Aaron Montgomery Ward knew that by using the technique of selling products directly to the consumer at appealing prices could, if executed effectively and efficiently, revolutionize the marketing industry and therefore be used as an innovative model for marketing products and creating customer loyalty. The term "direct marketing" was coined long after Montgomery Ward's time. In 1967 Lester Wunderman identified, named, and defined "direct marketing". Wunderman — considered to be the father of contemporary direct marketing — is behind the creation of the toll-free 1-800 number and numerous mail-order-based loyalty marketing programs including the Columbia Record Club, the magazine subscription card, and the American Express Customer Rewards program.

=== Modern consumer rewards programs ===
==== Frequent flyers ====
On May 1, 1981 American Airlines launched the AAdvantage frequent flyer program, which accumulated “reward miles” that a customer could later redeem for free travel. Within a few years, many other travel industry companies launched similar programs. The AAdvantage program now has over 100 million members.

==== Card linked offers ====
In 1996, Ahold Inc launched a frequent-shopper rewards program in 4 of its US-based grocery chains, Finast Friendly Markets, Maple Heights, Ohio. Stop & Shop Cos, and Bi-Lo. This was based on Graduate work research performed by Michael Raines and professor Robert Heoke. The early part of 2010 saw the rise of Card Linked Offers (CLOs) as a new loyalty marketing technique for brands, retailers and financial institutions, stemming from a rise in popularity of both mobile payment and coupons. CLOs connect offers or discounts directly to a consumer's credit card or debit card, which can then be redeemed at the point of sale. CLOs have been implemented by American Express and Groupon and CLO technology has been developed by companies such as Strands, Meniga, Smart Engine, Cartera Commerce, Womply, Cardlytics, Linkable Networks, Birdback, Clovr Media, and Offermatic. In order to receive and use CLOs, consumers must willingly opt into a CLO program and provide their credit/debit card information. When consumers see relevant CLO-enabled advertisements and product offers while browsing online, using a mobile device, watching TV, reading a newspaper or magazine or listening to the radio they can click, text or scan a QR code to link the CLO-enabled ad directly to their credit/debit card. After consumers purchase the designated retail location, the savings are credited directly to their bank, credit card or PayPal account. As such, CLOs eliminate point-of-sale integration, mail-in rebates and paper coupons. Offers are typically based upon consumer preferences and previous purchase history.

==== Loyalty apps ====
In recent years the big players have introduced loyalty apps in place of loyalty cards as part of their loyalty programs. These apps are downloaded onto a customer's phone.

== Loyalty marketing impact ==
Many loyalty programs have changed the way consumers interact with the companies from which they purchase products or services and how much consumers spend. Many consumers in the US and Europe have become quite accustomed to the rewards and incentives they receive by being a "card carrying" member of an airline, hotel or car rental program. In addition, research from Chris X. Moloney shows that nearly half of all credit card users in the US utilize a points-based rewards program.

In recent years, the competition for high-income customers has led many of these loyalty marketing program providers to provide significant perks that deliver value well beyond reward points or miles. Both American's AAdvantage program and Starwood Hotels' Preferred Guest program have received industry awards, called "Freddie Awards" by Inside Flyer Magazine and its publisher Randy Petersen for providing perks that customers value highly. These perks have become as important to many travelers as their reward miles according to research.

In his book, Loyalty Rules!, Fred Reichheld details the value of customer referral on the growth and financial performance of dozens of leading US firms. Reichheld purports that the measurement of company advocates, or promoters, is the strongest single measurable correlation between customers and corporate performance. Similarly, Chris X. Moloney has presented new findings (Loyalty World London 2006) that showed a magnetic value to a company to promote and measure customer referrals and advocacy via research and marketing.

Recent research studies also increasingly question the effectiveness of loyalty programs from the company's (rather than the customer's) perspective, arguing that rigorous business measurement of loyalty program KPIs is mostly absent or rudimentary (sometimes intentionally, sometimes due to lack of knowledge or inaccessible data).

=== Customer service and retention statistics ===
These statistics demonstrate the importance and effectiveness of having positive relationships with consumers as well as offering programs and rewards that encourage loyalty. The idea that keeping existing customers is far more cost-effective than selling to new customers is also reflected below.

- 69% of consumers in the U.S. claim that customer service is "very important" when they are considering different brands.
- 74% of millennials say they would switch to a different company due to poor customer service, and around 85% of Gen X and baby boomer consumers would claim the same.
- Consumers in paid membership loyalty programs are 62% more likely to spend more money on that brand and 59% more likely to choose that brand over competitors.
- Selling to existing customers has a 60-70% success rate while selling to new customers has a success rate of only 5-20% depending on the product.
- A 10% increase in customer retention is significant enough to raise a company's value by 30%.

=== Customer loyalty statistics ===
These statistics demonstrate the power that a customer's loyalty can have. Consumer loyalty is often long-lasting yet can be created in a much shorter amount of time.

- 58% of consumers state that they would have to have a "really bad" experience before they would consider switching from the brands they are loyal to.
- 77% of consumers claim to have maintained a relationship with specific brands for at least 10 years.
- 60% of millennials claim to have maintained a relationship with specific brands for at least 10 years despite being relatively young and having less time to form those loyalties.
- 63% of consumers consider themselves to be loyal to a brand by their fifth purchase.
- 85% of consumers say a loyalty program influences their decision to repeat purchase from the same brand

== Loyalty marketing and the loyalty business model ==
The loyalty business model relies on training of employees to achieve a specific paradigm: quality of product or service leads to customer satisfaction, which leads to customer loyalty, which leads to profitability. Loyalty marketing is an extension of that effort, relying upon word-of-mouth and advertising to draw upon the positive experiences of those exposed to loyalty business model-inspired ventures to attract new customers. Fred Reichheld makes the point in his books that one can leverage the "power of extension" to draw new customers.

The rapid expansion of frequent-flyer programs is due to the fact that loyalty marketing relies on the earned loyalty of current customers to attract new loyalty from future customers. Exclusive incentive programs must strike a balance between increasing benefits for new customers over any existing loyalty plan they are currently in and keeping existing customers from moving to new plans. Hallmark did this through devising a program that directly rewarded customers not only for buying merchandise and utilizing Hallmark.com, but also for gaining additional benefits through referring their friends.

The most recent loyalty marketing programs rely on viral marketing techniques to spread word of incentive and inducement programs through word of mouth.

=== Unpredictability of consumer biases ===
Consumers have biases when it comes to many product choices they make and tend to purchase the same brand of various products regardless of whether they consciously consider the product to be superior to its competitors. Brand loyalty is often not based in logic or rational thought which makes it hard to predict. Many times, consumers are drawn to products for something that has no effect on the product itself such as logos, slogans, and package design which makes rebranding a dangerous proposition for businesses but one with great potential for drawing in new customers.

A study from 1964 demonstrated the illogical nature of these biases by offering a group of women the choice of four separate loaves of bread each week over the course of twelve weeks. The loaves had identical packaging except for a letter on each package to indicate which loaf was which. Unbeknownst to the women, the loaves of bread were identical. Despite this, half of the women showed clear loyalties to one of the letters by the end of the study.

=== Methods of cultivating customer loyalty ===
Consumer access to online product reviews and price comparison tools has been identified as a factor contributing to declining customer loyalty. Common methods used to cultivate customer loyalty include the following.

==== Consistent quality ====
A single defective or low-quality product could be enough to turn a customer away, so businesses must offer a consistent product. If consumers buy a product that lives up to or even surpasses all of their expectations, they are unlikely to look elsewhere when buying that product again. Consistent delivery on expectations can make a brand's reputation one of quality and trust which are big factors in forming relationships with customers.

==== Transparency and communication ====
Companies use open communication, including through social media, to inform customers and gather feedback from them. This practice is associated with increased consumer trust.

==== Offer benefits and rewards to existing customers ====
Loyalty programs have been covered extensively throughout this article, and that is because they are so useful in getting customers to come back for more. Many businesses offer deals to new customers such as streaming services offering one-week free trials. The existing customers, however, are neglected which can lead to them feeling unimportant.

== See also ==
- Business model
- Incentive program
- Loyalty program
- Relationship marketing
- Strategic management
- Trust-based marketing
- Brand
