= Baking powder submarine =

Toy that dives and surfaces in water

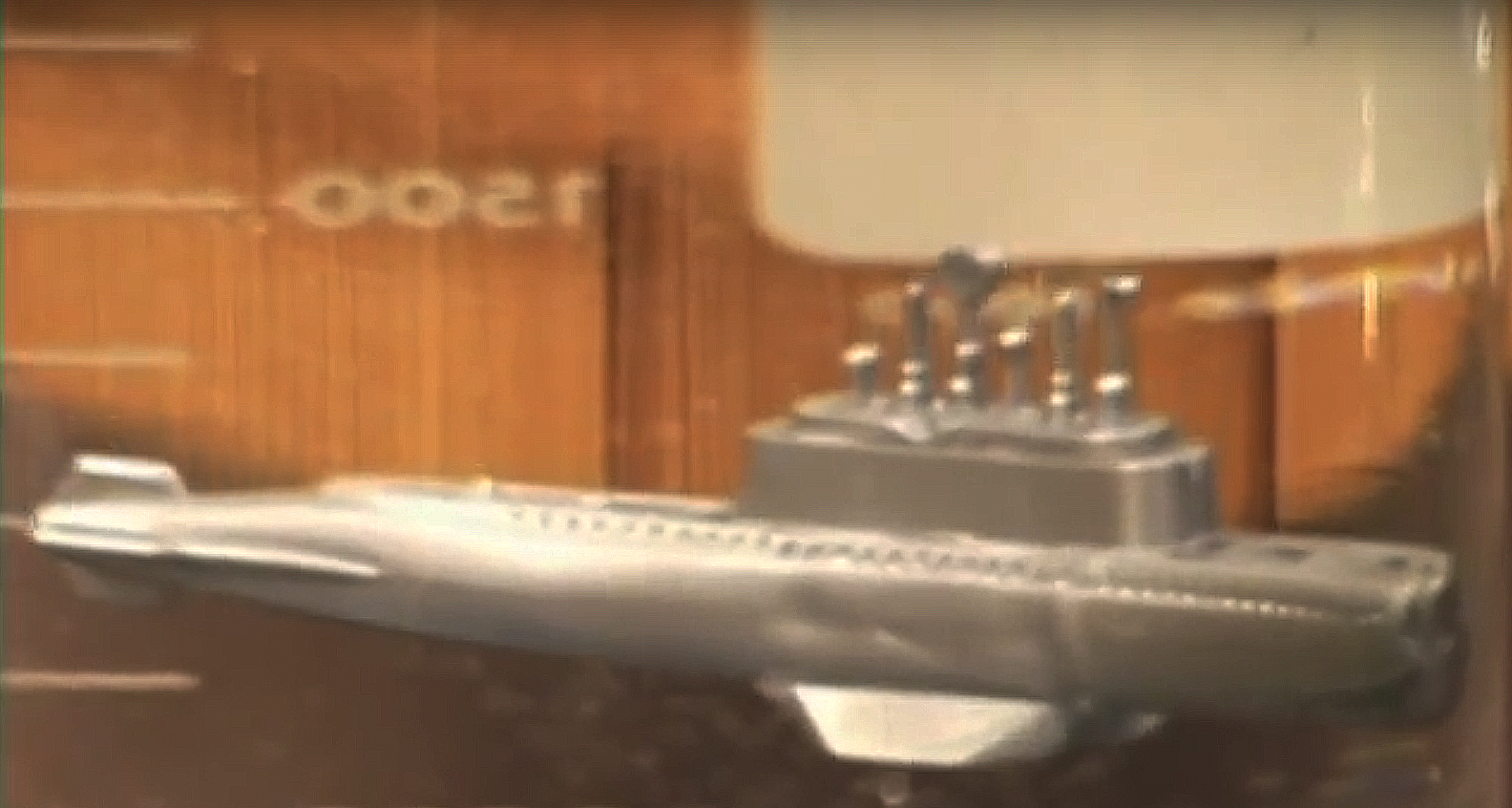
Toy submarine powered by baking powder

A baking powder submarine is a plastic toy submarine that dives and surfaces due to the addition of baking powder. Baking powder submarines are sometimes misidentified as "baking soda submarines"; however, baking soda alone dissolves and does not react when placed in water.

== History ==
In 1953, Benjamin and Harry Hirsch discovered that carbon dioxide gas bubbles produced in wet baking powder, as part of the chemical leavening process, could be used to make a toy submarine dive up and down in fresh water.

They sold their idea to the Kellogg's breakfast cereal company in 1954. Buoyed by the popularity of the first American atomic submarine, the USS Nautilus, commissioned in that year, a million 4.5-inch (110 mm) plastic ship model prizes were produced by May. They were mailed out in return for a fee of 25 cents and one cereal boxtop. A smaller 2.5-inch (64 mm) version was later produced to be used as a cereal box prize not requiring separate redemption by mail.

== Principle of operation ==
Baking powder is placed into a compartment in the bottom of the toy which is sealed except for a small hole (or holes). The toy sinks when placed into water, but after a few seconds, enough water leaks in to react with the baking powder and produce carbon dioxide bubbles. The resulting foam creates just enough buoyancy in the toy for it to rise towards the surface of the water. When the toy surfaces, it capsizes, releasing the gas into the air. The toy sinks, beginning the reaction again and repeating the entire process.

The same principle of operation was later used for toy frogmen powered by baking powder in a small container on the foot of the figure. However, some other cereal prizes were cartesian divers, which operated on a different principle and did not require baking powder.

== In popular culture ==
- In the original novel and film, Billy Liar, the title character's parents say they declared their love for him by buying him a box of corn flakes with a submarine inside.
- In the Everybody Loves Raymond episode, "Your Place or Mine?", Ray and Robert (and later Robert and Frank) fight over who gets to own the submarine cereal prize (Robert loses both times).
