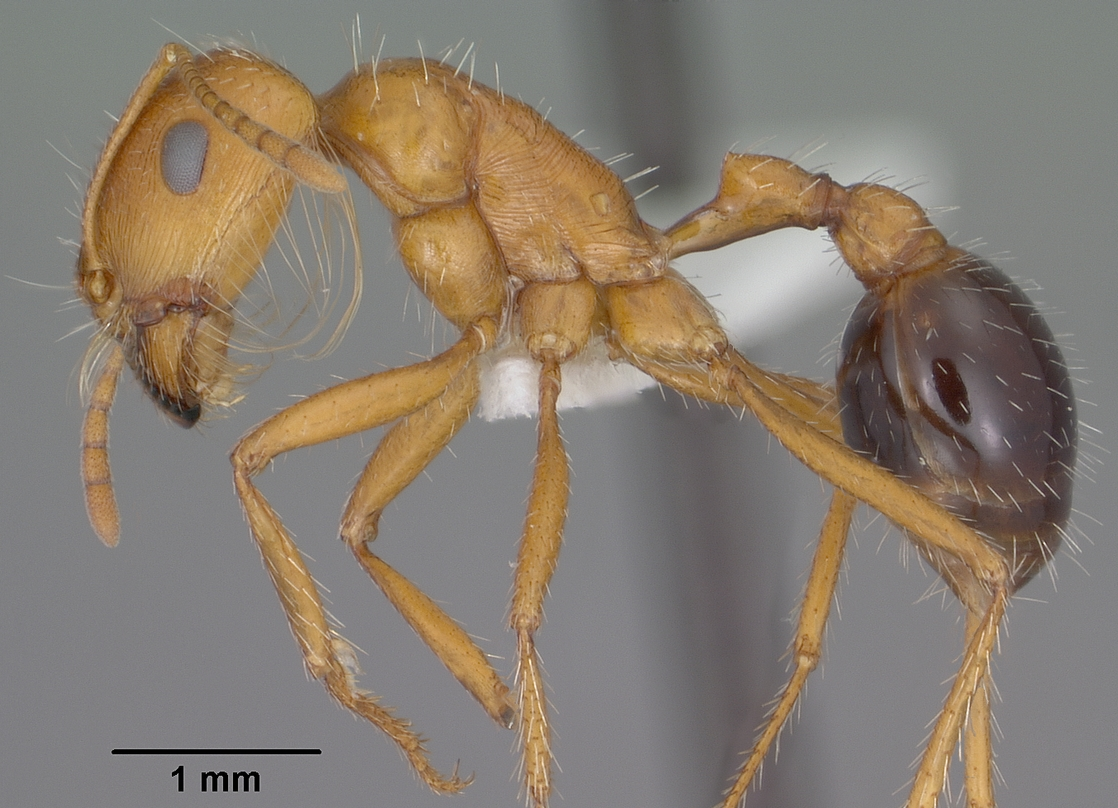
- P. californicus worker from Arizona

Scientific classification
- Kingdom: Animalia
- Phylum: Arthropoda
- Clade: Pancrustacea
- Class: Insecta
- Order: Hymenoptera
- Family: Formicidae
- Subfamily: Myrmicinae
- Genus: Pogonomyrmex
- Species: P. californicus

Binomial name
- Pogonomyrmex californicus Cole, 1968

= Pogonomyrmex californicus =

Species of ant

Pogonomyrmex californicus, or the California harvester ant, is a species of ant in the subfamily Myrmicinae. It is native to North America, where it is found in the southwestern United States and northern Mexico. It is known as the ant species which is used by Uncle Milton's Ant Farm.

== Biology ==
Pogonomyrmex californicus can be found in open, warm, and sandy areas. It typically forages during the day, both individually or in a group, forming columns as they work. It preys on arthropods, such as the larvae of the raisin moth (Cadra figulilella) and collects seeds. It can form colonies of thousands of individuals, with the average colony size being approximately 4,500 individuals. The nest entrances are often irregular and are surrounded by loose sand arranged in a circular or semi-circular pattern. Reproduction occurs mostly from May to July, typically during hot daytime conditions of 80–90 °F, with elevated afternoon humidity. However, in some parts of range, its nuptial flight may take place from April to August, if weather conditions permit.

=== Polygynous colonies ===
Pogonomyrmex californicus are known to be facultatively polygynous, where colonies will occasionally contain multiple queens. Most colonies are founded and sustained by one queen, but nests have been noted to contain multiple queens in a cooperative, a phenomenon known as pleometrosis. Colonies with multiple queens have been found to have higher average heat tolerance and less variation in heat tolerance, allowing for longer foraging times and an advantage over competitors with lower heat tolerances. The reason for the difference in heat tolerance between single-queen and multiple-queen colonies is unknown, although there are several theories for the disparity.

== Range ==
Pogonomyrmex californicus is found in the United States in Arizona, California, New Mexico, Nevada, Texas and Utah and in the Mexican states of Baja California, Sinaloa, Sonora, and Chihuahua.

== Chumash use as hallucinogen ==
The Chumash people of California would sometimes use the species as an entheogen with which to initiate boys into manhood. The consumption of these ants was considered a safer method of inducing visions than the more usual method employed which involved the drinking of a brew prepared from the deliriant herb Datura wrightii. The ants were swallowed alive on eagle down and the venom injected in the stings that they inflicted on the mouths and throats of the boys would cause them to hallucinate. Around 250 ants constituted an effective dose.
