= E. Joseph Cossman =

American inventor (1918–2002)

Eli Joseph Cossman
- Born: April 13, 1918; Pittsburgh, PA
- Died: December 7, 2002 (aged 84); Palm Springs, CA
- Known for: Spud gun, Ant farm toys

Eli Joseph Cossman (April 13, 1918 – December 7, 2002) was an American inventor, businessman, entrepreneur and author. With Milton Levine, Cossman was the co-creator of the ant farm and spud gun toys. He also made millions of dollars selling various novelties and conducting sales seminars.

== Career ==
Cossman started the Los Angeles-based Cossman & Levine Inc. with his brother-in-law Milton Levine in 1946. In 1965, Levine bought out Cossman, renamed the company Uncle Milton Industries and packaged the product as Uncle Milton's Ant farm.

A 1989 article in the Chicago Tribune called him the "King of the Thingamajig".
