= Cossman =

Cossman is a surname. Notable people with the surname include:

- Brenda Cossman (born 1960), professor of Law at the University of Toronto
- Lynne Cossman, associate professor in sociology at Mississippi State University
- E. Joseph Cossman, American inventor and entrepreneur

== See also ==
- Cossmann
