= Barry Divola =

Australian journalist

Barry Charles Divola is an Australian journalist, columnist and author.

== Birth and family ==
Divola was born in Sydney, the first son of Kevin Divola. He lives in Perth, Western Australia, with his wife and two daughters.

== Writing career ==
Divola is a regular contributor to The Sydney Morning Herald and was a columnist and feature writer for that newspaper's monthly publication, (sydney) magazine, where he presented the columns Street Life and Hole in the Wall. He was the music critic for Who, a senior writer for Rolling Stone and contributor to Madison and Entertainment Weekly.

== Bibliography ==
=== Books ===
- Divola, Barry (1998). Fanclub : It's a fan's world – popstars just live in it. St Leonards, NSW: Allen & Unwin.
- — (2004). Searching for Kingly Critter : A deliciously different tale of obsession and nostalgia. Sydney: ABC Books.
- M is for Metal : The loudest alphabet book on earth (with Paul McNeil) – ABC Books, (Syd, 2006) ISBN 9780975683408
- The Secret Life of Backpackers : A bunk's-eye view of the tourist trail from Bondi to Cairns – ABC Books, (Syd, 2008) ISBN 9780733320927
- Nineteen Seventysomething – Affirm Press, (2010) ISBN 9780980637854

=== Essays and reporting ===
- Divola, Barry (September 2014). "Living on the edge : bladesmith Karim Haddad teaches people how to make knives, but it's about much more than the sharp, pointy things". Smith Journal. 12: 64–68.

=== Album reviews ===
| Album title | Artist | Reviewed in |
|---|---|---|
| Kindred | Passion Pit | Divola, Barry (May 2015). "Passion Pit's ecstatic pop". Reviews. Rolling Stone (Australia). 762: 90. |
| No Pier Pressure | Brian Wilson | Divola, Barry (May 2015). "The man who wasn't there". Reviews. Rolling Stone (Australia). 762: 92. |
| Beat the Champ | The Mountain Goats | Divola, Barry (May 2015). "[Untitled review]". Reviews. Rolling Stone (Australia). 762: 94. |
| Postcards from Paradise | Ringo Starr | Divola, Barry (May 2015). "[Untitled review]". Reviews. Rolling Stone (Australia). 762: 97. |
| Carrie & Lowell | Sufjan Stevens | Divola, Barry (May 2015). "Sufjan's quiet contemplation". Reviews. Rolling Stone (Australia). 762: 98. |

== Awards ==
He won the Banjo Paterson Award for short fiction in 2004, 2005 and 2006 for his stories Nipple, Cicada Boy and Nixon.
