= Kossmann =

Kossmann or Koßmann is a German surname. Notable people with the surname include:

- Alfred Kossmann (1922–1998), Dutch poet and prose writer
- Ernst Kossmann (1922–2003), Dutch historian and twin brother of Alfred
- Hans Kossmann (born 1962), Canadian-Swiss professional ice hockey coach
- Hans Kossmann (alpine skier) (born 1965), Chilean alpine skier
- Karl-Richard Koßmann (1896–1969), German general
- Kurt Kossmann (born 1966), American professional race car driver
- Maarten Kossmann (born 1966), Dutch linguist and professor
- Martín Vidaurre Kossmann (born 2000), Chilean cross-country mountain biker
- Nina Kossman, Russian-American writer
- Reiner Kossmann (1927–2013), German ice hockey player
- Yvette Kosmann-Schwarzbach (born 1941), French mathematician and professor

== See also ==
- Kosman, a village in the municipality of Foča, Bosnia and Herzegovina
- Kosman (surname)
- Cossmann
- Cosman
