= Nosco Plastics =

American manufacturing company

- Industry: Manufacturing
- Founded: 1934

Nosco Plastics, Inc. (commonly called NOSCO, the mark used on its molded products) was the plastics molding division of National Organ Supply Company created in 1934 to make plastic parts for electric organs and was located at 1701 Gaskell Avenue, Erie, Pennsylvania, 16503. Beginning in 1948 with the implementation of the newly developed screw injection molding process, NOSCO quickly became a major early producer of tiny plastic toys called "slum" (very cheap prizes that are bought in bulk, sometimes for as little as $1 a gross or less) sold to wholesalers as carnival merchandise, used by the millions as prizes in packages of Cracker Jack popcorn confection, and mail-order flats that were heavily advertised in American comic books as "100 Toy Soldiers for $1" by E. Joseph Cossman & Company. NOSCO also held a number of patents on plastic molded products including mechanical toys, storage containers, pallets, and medical syringes.

== History ==
=== Early Erie beginnings ===
Harry Auch and John Hallas, of the Haskell Company, went to Erie, Pennsylvania, in 1920 to join Anton Gottfried, Henry Kugel, and Kugel's son Harry Kugel in the formation of a metal organ pipe manufacturer called National Organ Supply. The NOSCO Division was created to manufacture injection molded plastic parts for electric organs in 1934. But NOSCO would become a major player as a manufacturer of tiny plastic toys used as prizes, mail-order merchandise, and carnival "hooch" with the invention of the screw injection method of molding plastics implemented in 1948.

=== The Modernistics ===
In the 1940s, NOSCO produced some of its first non-organ items in the molded plastic figures by New York designer Don Manning. They were stylistic pre-war art deco versions of animals such as camels, deer, dogs, elephants, giraffes, horses, storks, and unicorns. Many are marked "USA" and some are marked "Don Manning". Some larger ones are marked "Designed Don Manning". The larger molds were eventually copied by the Breyer Molding Company and were issued as the "Golden Buck" and the "Golden Doe" (often referred to by collectors as the Modernistic Buck and Doe). Smaller, roughly 2" versions of some of the same designs were sold as tchotchkes and as bar drink markers—including an antelope, camel, deer, dog, elephant, stork, horse, monkey, squirrel, and swan.

=== Levin Brothers: early NOSCO wholesalers ===
The first set of 12 screw injection molded NOSCO toys was advertised for sale as carnival merchandise in Cincinnati newspaper "The Billboard". A 1/6th page advertisement in the February 7, 1948 issue with the title "Brand New, Low Cost Plastic Slum (Give-aways)" that shows "Lifelike animals that appeal to young and old alike. Stand 2" high on a flat, firm base. Molded in five bright, eye-catching colors. Never before has quality slum been priced so low." The ad only says to write for jobbers who sell these items. NOSCO did not sell its products to the general public. One of the major wholesalers for NOSCO slum was Terre Haute, Indiana based Levin Brothers with ads in "The Billboard" beginning in the February 21, 1948 issue. One Levin Brothers listing beginning May 29, 1948 stated "Nosco Plastic Animal Standups" were being offered for $0.95 a gross.

=== Cossman: comic book heroes ===
Milton Levine, later creator of the mail-order cult classic Ant Farm and founder of Uncle Milton toys, formed a partnership with his brother-in-law E. Joseph Cossman to get into the plastic toy industry, a business Levine had read would be a post-war growth industry. Together they formed E. Joseph Cossman & Company (a.k.a. Cossman & Levine Co.) which contracted with NOSCO to make flat toy soldiers for mail order that they advertised originally as "100 Toy Soldiers for $1" (later $1.25, $1.75, and $1.98) which was advertised in nearly every American comic book of the time. The "100 Cowboys and Indians" set was another popular series sold by Cossman which came in an illustrated box with a unique die-cut "pop-out, build-it-yourself" diorama. The "3 Ring Circus" mail order offer of plastic flats was not as big a seller according to Levine. The "100 Cowboys and Indians" and the "3 Ring Circus" flat standups were found as individual prizes in packages of Cracker Jack.

=== "Now that's a Cracker Jack!" ===
From 1948 through 1960, The Cracker Jack Company at 4800 West 66th Street, Chicago, Illinois, the largest toy buyer in the world at the time, used many millions of NOSCO toys as prizes in its caramel coated popcorn confection. These include the "Animal Stand-ups" (CJ Archive #Z-1111) that were marketed by the Levin Brothers as well as the "100 Cowboys and Indians" set of 12 different figures (CJ Archive #Z-1137) and "3 Ring Circus" set of 12 different figures (CJ Archive #Z-1154) marketed as mail order items by Cossman & Levine. Other sets made by NOSCO for Cracker Jack include Alphabet Animals set of 26 (Z-1179), People (Occupations) Stand-ups (Z-1124), Spacemen Stand-ups set of 10 (Z-1227), a set of 16 double-sided Stand-ups (Z-1144), and Zodiac Coins set of 12 disks (Z-1182).

=== NOSCO toys ===
A 21-inch plastic train with a wind up motor was advertised in the April 8, 1950 of The Billboard. The retail price was $5.00.

Hot'See Hot Rod was a big hit for NOSCO in 1952 and was featured in the November issue of Life magazine. It featured a clear plastic motor housing where moving pistons could be seen simulating the action of an engine. NOSCO employees Bruno C Roehrl and Harold S Cloyd invented the mechanism and clear plastic housing that simulated the piston action, patent number US2726482 filed May 8, 1951 and granted December 13, 1955.

NOSCO followed up the same year with an airplane toy when pushed the wheels would turn a cog that ran the engine with working pistons and rotating propeller. Bruno C. Roehrl filed the patent number US2671983 on July 13, 1951, and it was granted on March 16, 1954.

"Happy Harry" musical pull toy was featured in the November 23, 1953 issue of Life. The 11-1/2" long car played a tune when pushed or pulled and sold for $2.49 retail. NOSCO employee Bruno C Roehrl invented the "Music box cylinder and comb" used in "Happy Harry", patent number US2787927 filed April 8, 1953 and granted April 9, 1957.

=== NOSCO sold to Holgate Brothers ===
In 1959, Nosco was sold to Holgate Brothers, also of Erie Pennsylvania. Only two years later, in May 1961, Holgate and its subsidiary Nosco Plastics were bought out by another plastic injection molding company, White Eagle International, Inc, of Midlands, TX. A Kane Republican newspaper article at that time noted that Nosco, which had plants in Erie, PA, and Los Angeles, CA, made components for “appliances, pharmaceutical, air conditioning, radio, television, aeronautics, and automotive industries.” There was no mention of toys, so presumably Nosco's toy production likely ceased with the Holgate buy-out or even before. By May 1962, the same newspaper was reporting the demise of Holgate, alluding to the closing of their factory. In 1964, a further merger of Nosco and Holgate was announced with “the name of the surviving corporation [being] Nosco Plastics.” Nosco Plastics was closed in 1977, and the property and machinery were sold at public auction. White Eagle International hung on until 1983 when it, too, ceased operations.

== See also ==
- Cracker Jack
- Milton Levine
- Prize (marketing)
