= Kosman (surname) =

Kosman is a surname. Notable people with the surname include:

- Admiel Kosman (born 1957), Israeli poet and Talmudist
- Aryeh Kosman (1935–2021), American philosopher
- Henry Kosman (1913–1984), American politician from Nebraska
- Joshua Kosman (born 1959), American music critic
- Marceli Kosman (1940–2023), Polish historian
- Mike Kosman (1917–2002), American baseball player

== See also ==
- Kosman String Quartet
- Kossmann
