= Picture card =

Picture card may refer to:

- Flash memory card for a digital camera
- Picture card (cards) which has a picture on it (usually Jack, Queen or King, but sometimes including Ace or Joker)
- Trade card
- xD-Picture Card
