= Cossmann =

Cossmann is a German surname. Notable people with the surname include:

- Bernhard Cossmann (1822–1910), German cellist
- Maurice Cossmann (1850–1924), French paleontologist and malacologist
- Paul Nikolaus Cossmann (1869–1942), German journalist, son of Bernhard

== See also ==
- Cosman
- Cossman
- Kossmann
