= Christophe Bettally =

English scientific instrument maker

Christophe Bettally (18th century – 19th century) was an English scientific instrument maker. He was probably of Italian descent with an anglicised surname.

Bettally was active between 1787 and c. 1807 in London, where he had shops in Oxford Street and Pimlico, and Paris. He produced thermometers, barometers, hygrometers, and glass instruments for physics experiments, according to his trade cards in the Banks Collection at the British Museum.
