= Pep (cereal) =

Breakfast cereal made by Kellogg's

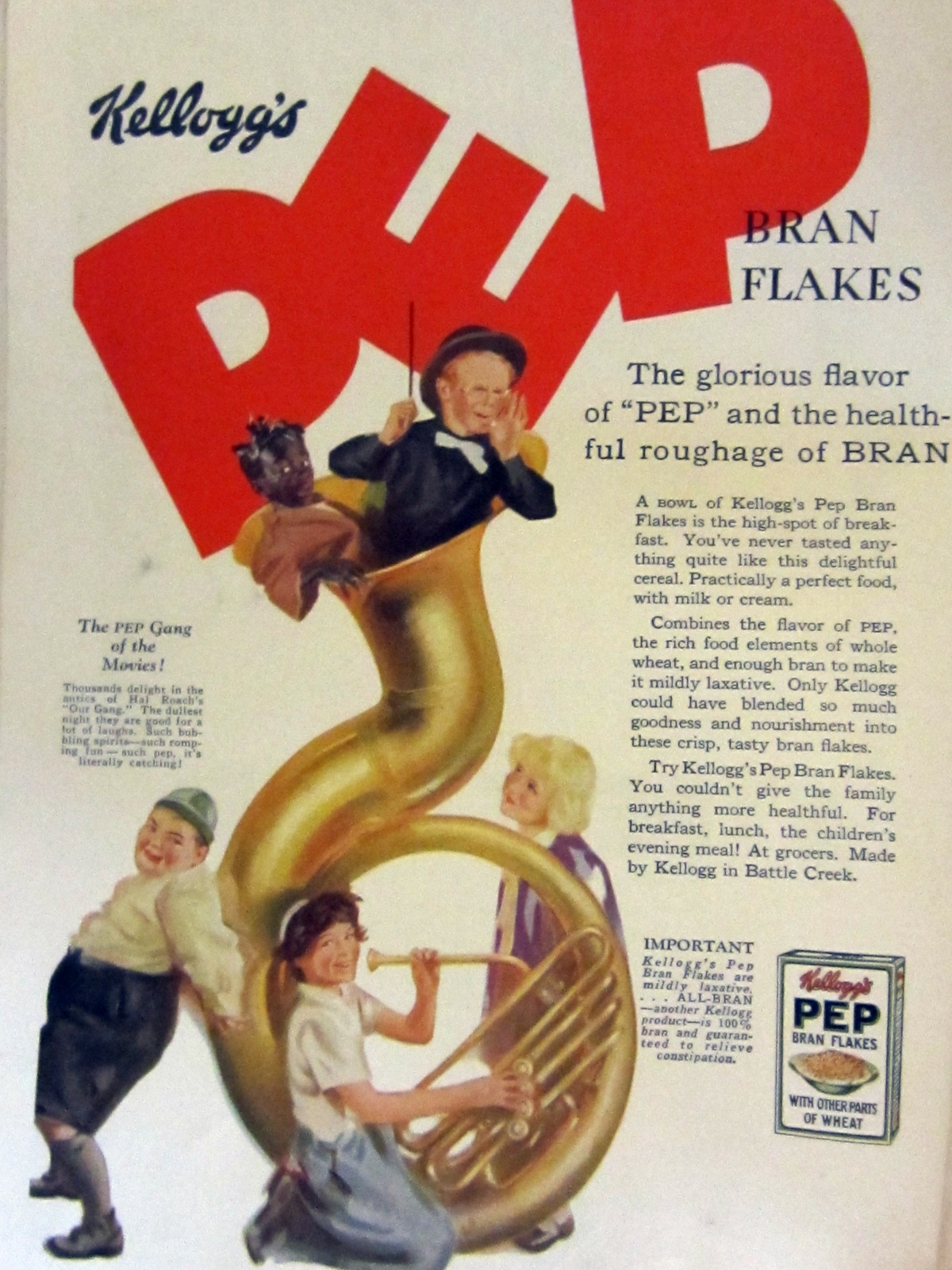
Pep ad featuring Our Gang (1928)

Pep was a brand of whole-wheat breakfast cereal produced by the Kellogg Company, and introduced in 1923, which became the first to be fortified with vitamins B and D in 1938. Pep was a long-running rival to Wheaties, and also the sponsor of Mutual Radio's The Adventures of Superman radio series. One of Pep's advertising slogans was "the Sunshine cereal".

Pep became one of the first "fortified" cereals, with an infusion of vitamins, beginning in the 1930s. Extensive advertising, from print advertisements to sponsorship of The Adventures of Superman and the television and radio shows of Tom Corbett—Space Cadet helped keep the brand in the public's (particularly children's) consciousness. Pep was included in "variety packs" of serving-sized boxes of Kellogg's cereals. The cereal's "mildly laxative" property was routinely mentioned in print ads. Pep faded from popularity as Kellogg's shifted advertising to other products. The cereal was still being sold alongside the company's similar Bran Flakes in Canadian markets until the early 1990s.

== In-package prizes ==
Kellogg inserted a prize in the form of pinback buttons into each box of Pep cereal. Beginning in 1943, Pep pins included U.S. military units and squadrons. Later, in 1945, characters from newspaper comics were introduced. There were five series of comics characters, with 18 different buttons in each set. This would make 90 buttons in the complete set, but the Superman button appeared in all five sets, because of the close association between Kellogg's Pep and the Adventures of Superman radio show. This makes a total of 86 unique comic buttons in the set. Mint condition Pep pins, as with prizes from many cereal brands, have become sought-after collectables.
