= Prize (marketing) =

Marketing concept

Prizes are promotional items—small toys, games, trading cards, collectables, and other small items of nominal value, found in packages of brand-name retail products. These items are generally included in the price of the product, and are included with the intent to boost sales, similar to toys in kid's meals. Collectable prizes produced (and sometimes numbered) in series are used extensively as a loyalty marketing program in food, drink, and other retail products to increase sales through repeat purchases from collectors.

Prizes have been distributed through bread, candy, cereal, cheese, chips, crackers, laundry detergent, margarine, popcorn, and soft drinks. The types of prizes have included comics, fortunes, jokes, key rings, magic tricks, models (made of paper or plastic), pin-back buttons, plastic mini-spoons, puzzles, riddles, stickers, temporary tattoos, tazos, trade cards, trading cards, and small toys (made from injection molded plastic, paper, cardboard, tin litho, ceramics, or pot metal).

Prizes are sometimes referred to as "in-pack" premiums, although historically the word "premium" has been used to denote (as opposed to a prize) an item that is not packaged with the product and requires a proof of purchase and/or a small additional payment to cover shipping and/or handling charges.

== History ==
=== Smokers become collectors ===
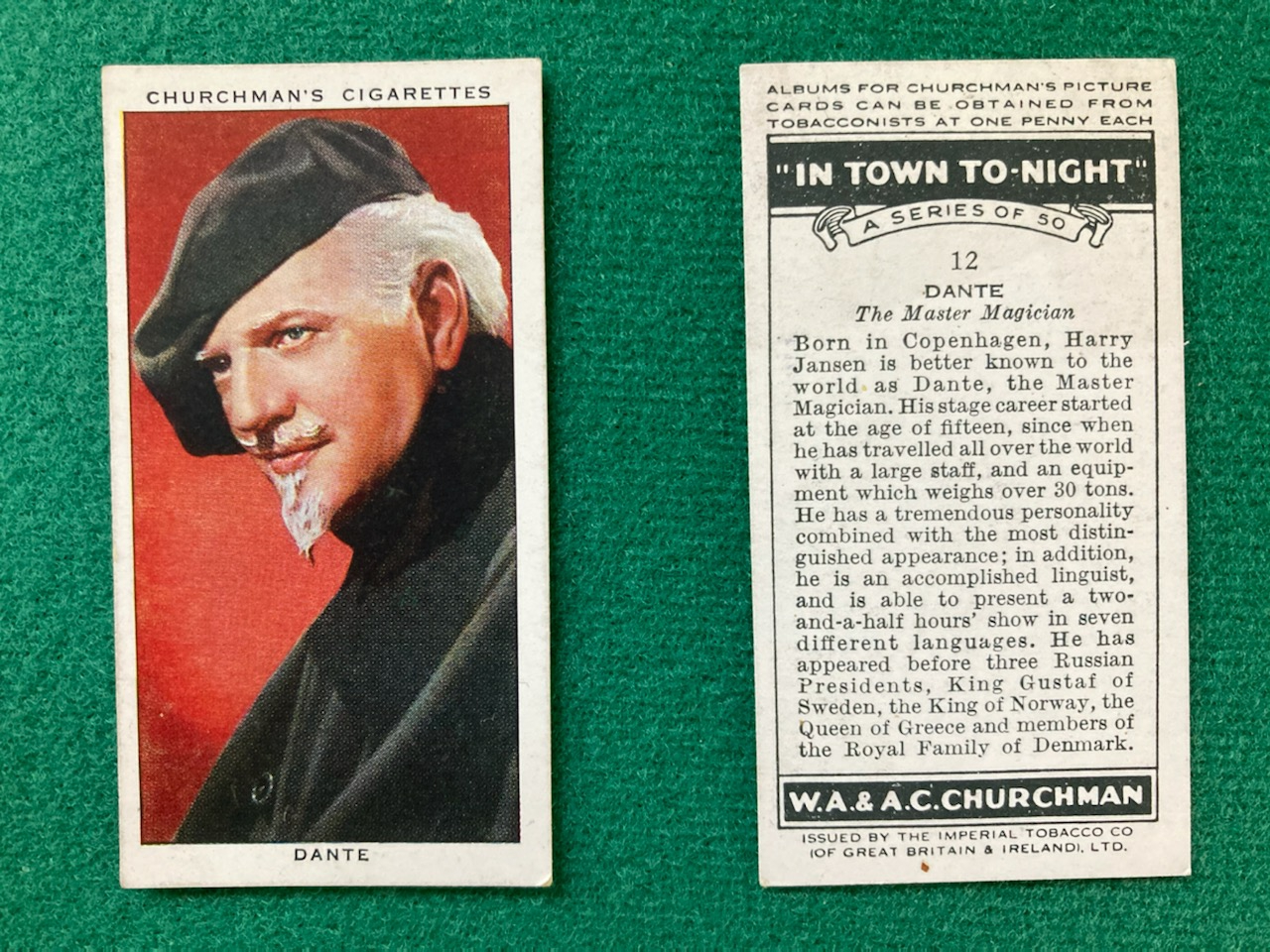
A cigarette card

Some of the earliest prizes were cigarette cards — trade cards advertising the product (not to be confused with trading cards) that were inserted into paper packs of cigarettes as stiffeners to protect the contents. Allen & Ginter in the U.S. in 1886, and British company W.D. & H.O. Wills in 1888, were the first tobacco companies to print advertisements and, a couple of years later, lithograph pictures on the cards with an encyclopedic variety of topics from nature to war to sports — subjects that appealed to men who smoked. By 1900, there were thousands of tobacco card sets manufactured by 300 different companies. Children would stand outside of stores to ask customers who bought cigarettes if they could have their card.

Following the success of cigarette cards, trade cards were produced by manufacturers of other products and included in the product or handed to the customer by the store clerk at the time of purchase. Other inserts in tobacco included tin litho prizes, called tobacco tags (in plug tobacco), and tobacco silks (popular from 1910 to 1916) that could be collected to put in quilts were inserted in or attached to tobacco tins and sometimes catalogued as cigarette cards. World War II put an end to cigarette card production due to limited paper resources, and after the war cigarette cards never really made a comeback. After that collectors of prizes from retail products took to collecting tea cards in the UK and bubble gum cards in the US.

=== The home run of prizes ===
The first baseball cards were trade cards featuring the Brooklyn Atlantics produced in 1868 by Peck and Snyder, a sporting goods company that manufactured baseball equipment. In 1869, Peck and Snyder trade cards featured the first professional team, the Red Stockings. Most of the baseball cards around the beginning of the 20th century came in candy and tobacco products produced by such companies as Breisch-Williams confectionery company of Oxford, Pennsylvania, American Caramel Company, the Imperial Tobacco Company of Canada, and Cabañas, a Cuban cigar manufacturer. In fact it is a baseball set, known as the T206 tobacco card set, issued from 1909 to 1911 in cigarette and loose tobacco packs through 16 different brands owned by the American Tobacco Company that is considered by collectors to be the most popular set of cigarette cards. A T206 Honus Wagner card sold on 6 April 2013, for $2.1 million in an online auction, the highest price paid for a card in a public sale. In 1933, Goudey Gum Company of Boston issued baseball cards with players biographies on the backs and was the first to put baseball cards in bubble gum. Bowman Gum of Philadelphia issued its first baseball cards in 1948 and became the biggest issuer of baseball cards from 1948 to 1952.

=== Topps in cards ===
Topps Chewing Gum, Inc., now known as The Topps Company, Inc., started inserting trading cards into bubble gum packs in 1950 — with such topics as TV and film cowboy Hopalong Cassidy; "Bring 'em Back Alive" cards featuring Frank Buck on big game hunts in Africa; and All-American football cards. Topps introduced the topic of baseball in trading cards in 1951, and Sy Berger created the first modern baseball card, complete with playing record and statistics, produced by Topps in 1952. The 1952 Topps Mickey Mantle card is one of the most desirable baseball cards for collectors. Topps purchased the Bowman Gum company in 1956. Topps was the leader in the trading card industry from 1956 to 1980, not only in sports cards. Many of the top selling non-sports cards were produced by Topps, including Wacky Packages (1967, 1973–1977), Star Wars (beginning in 1977) and Garbage Pail Kids (beginning in 1985). Topps inserted baseball cards as prizes into packs of gum through 1981, when the gum became a thing of the past and the cards were sold without the gum.

=== Prize or premium coupon; or both? ===
Bazooka Joe appeared on comics in Topps' Bazooka Bubble Gum beginning in 1953. There have been numerous kids (and adults) who have collected the Bazooka comics as prizes for over 50 years. Bazooka started issuing premium catalogs in 1956, and the comics prizes doubled as coupons that, when collected in certain quantities, could be exchanged for premiums, such as bikes, microphones, or plastic rings. Bazooka Bubble Gum has a successful loyalty marketing program, through the prizes (comics) and the premiums (mail-order merchandise). Over the years, Bazooka Bubble Gum has been shipped to over 100 different countries and it has been translated into over 50 different languages. Topps sells a half a billion pieces of Bazooka Bubble Gum a year.

=== "A Prize in Every Box" ===
The most famous use of prizes in the United States (and the word "prize" in this context) is Cracker Jack brand popcorn confection. Prizes have been inserted into every package of Cracker Jack continuously since 1912. A familiar jingle to people who watched television in the United States in the 1960s and '70s goes "Candy-coated popcorn, peanuts and a prize. That's what you get with Cracker Jack!" Cracker Jack sales are not what they used to be, with much more competition in the snack industry and less creative prizes. The most valuable prizes found in Cracker Jack are the baseball cards distributed in 1914 and 1915. Although most of the prizes recently are just printed paper, in 2004, a complete set of 1914 Cracker Jack baseball cards — including the highly sought after "Shoeless" Joe Jackson and Ty Cobb cards — was sold for a record $800,000.

=== Cereal prizes ===
W.K. Kellogg was the first to introduce prizes in boxes of cereal beginning in 1906. The marketing strategy that he established has produced thousands of different cereal box prizes that have been distributed by the tens of billions. The first breakfast cereal prize was The Funny Jungleland Moving Pictures Book given to customers in the stores by merchants at the time of purchase of two packages of Kellogg's Corn Flakes. In 1909, Kellogg's changed the book give-away to a premium mail-in offer for the cost of a dime. By 1912, Kellogg's had distributed 2.5 million Jungleland books. The book underwent various edition changes and was last offered to consumers in 1937. In 1945, Kellogg inserted a prize in the form of a pin-back button into each box of Pep cereal. Pep pins have included U.S. Army squadrons as well as characters from newspaper comics. There were 5 series of comic characters and 18 different buttons in each set, with a total of 90 in the collection. Kellogg's 3D Baseball and Football Cards produced by Optigraphics were a big hit from 1970 to 1983 in packages of Kellogg's cereals, initially Corn Flakes and later other brands. Other manufacturers of major brands of cereal (including General Mills, Malt-O-Meal, Nabisco, Nestlé, Post Foods, and Quaker Oats) followed suit and inserted prizes into boxes of cereal to promote sales and brand loyalty.

=== Margarine spreads prizes in Europe ===
Oleomargarine was big business in Germany with hundreds of brands. Since 1920 margarine brands had put prizes in margarine, produced cards similar to tobacco cards of the time, and promoted albums for consumers to place their collections. Prizes made from metal and paper were also used from time to time. The Great Depression of 1929 slowed the previously unbridled development of prizes used in margarine. But after World War II, margarine prizes flourished with many series of printed cards and albums.

With the advent of injection molding came the plastic prizes. Cracker Jack had introduced plastic flats in its popcorn confection in the United States in 1948, and beginning in 1950, Fri-Homa, one of the leading German manufacturers of margarine owned by Fritz Homann, inserted prizes into its retail packages to promote brand loyalty. The first plastic margarine prizes were made by SIKU toy company owned by Homann's friend Richard Sieper. Many margarine brands followed suite. Most of the plastic prizes from German margarine were molded in a light cream color designed to make them look like tiny carved ivory figures — though made of polystyrene. These prizes are generically called "margarinefiguren" (EN: margarine figures), because they originated in oleomargarine products, but they were also found in tobacco and other retail food products.

The era of margarine prizes ended in 1954 due to an agreement between German margarine producers to stop using in-pack prizes to promote their products. In the short period between 1950 and 1954, over 258 series (thousands of individual shapes) of plastic prizes were produced. The retail companies that used margarine figures as in-pack prizes included Ei-Fein Margarine, Fri-Homa Margarine, Voss Margarine, Wagner Margarine, Kothe Tobacco, and Mampe Liquor, as well as coffee, tea, oatmeal, and shoe cream. Other businesses and attractions that distributed these prizes with purchase were Markt-Apotheke Pharmacies, Siebenhaar and Braunschweig shoe stores, and Berlin and Magdeburg Zoos. For many post-war German children, margarine prizes were the only toys they possessed for years. More than casual collectibles among nostalgic adults today, these tiny plastic loyalty marketing tools are a noteworthy element in the cultural history of German-speaking countries.

=== Frito-Lay ===
Frito-Lay is the current owner of Cracker Jack, the U.S. popcorn confection brand known for the "Prize Inside", Frito-Lay also regularly includes tazos and tattoos in packages of Lay's chips worldwide. In parts of Latin America, Frito-Lay has even introduced a brand called Cheetos Sorpresa (English: Surprise), which includes a licensed prize (from movies, television, and video games) in every 29–gram bag. Cheetos Sorpresa Era de Hielo (available in Mexico) included plastic ice molds with characters from the film Ice Age 3 in 45–gram bags.

=== Usefulness and collectability ===
Winter's, a Peruvian brand of chocolates owned by Compañía Nacional de Chocolates de Perú S.A., has a confectionery product called Chocopunch that is a cream chocolate in small individual packages. A key promotional aspect of Chocopunch since 1997 has been, packaged with the product, colorful injection molded plastic cucharitas (mini spoons) — in the shapes of different characters from movies, television, and video games — that are collected as prizes. Chocopunch El Chavo came with two flavors (chocolate and vanilla) combined in one 17 gram container. Packaged with Chocopunch El Chavo were mini spoons in the shape of characters from the syndicated cartoon television series El Chavo del Ocho. The injection molded plastic mini spoons came in 12 different shapes and five different colors, with a total of 60 different items in the collection.

== Technical advances ==
=== Sticky business ===
An important development in prizes is credited to American inventor R. Stanton (Stan) Avery. In 1935, Avery invented a machine to create self-adhesive labels. He started a company called Kum Klean Products to produce them. Self-adhesive labels with pre-printed designs on the front became commonly known as stickers. Today this company is known as the Avery Dennison Corporation and is a major supplier of self-adhesive stamps to the U.S. Postal Service. Stickers had their fads beginning in the late 1950s with bumper stickers through the 1960s and children's sticker trading albums of the 1980s. Prizes used in retail products, including breakfast cereal, bubble gum, and Cracker Jack, reflected these trends, and many thousands of examples of colorfully printed self-adhesive works of art have found their way as prizes into packages of retail food and household products.

=== Plastic injection molding ===
The invention of a screw injection molding machine by American inventor James Watson Hendry in 1946 changed the world of prizes forever. Thermoplastics could be used to produce toys and other plastic objects much more rapidly, and much more cheaply, because recycled plastic could be remolded using this process. In addition, injection molding for plastics required much less cool-down time for the toys, because the plastic is not completely melted before being injected into the molds. By 1948 the process was widely available, and injection-molded plastic prizes began to appear by the millions in boxes of Cracker Jack, breakfast cereal, and German margarine (1950-1954). Hendry also developed the first gas-assisted injection molding process in the 1970s, which permitted the production of complex, hollow prizes that cooled quickly. This greatly improved design flexibility as well as the strength and finish of manufactured parts while reducing production time, cost, weight and waste.

=== Lenticular technology ===
Lenticular lens technology, a major development in printing with significant applications in consumer marketing, brought numerous prizes — sometimes called tilt cards, flickers, or wiggle pictures — including images illustrated to morph from one view to another, show motion, or show depth (3D). Victor Anderson, a leader in the commercial success of lenticular printing, co-founded the Vari-Vue company in New York, which by the 1950s had produced millions of lenticular products, and lenticulars had become a pop culture craze. Anderson created the first animated advertising button with the "I LIKE IKE" slogan for Eisenhower's campaign in 1951. In the 1950s, Vari-Vue produced lenticular prizes under the "Magic-Motion" brand that were inserted into packages of numerous consumer products, including Cracker Jack popcorn confection in the US, and Locatelli's popular Formaggino Mio cheese in Italy. Anderson related in a 1996 interview that he had made animated prizes for Cheerios, about 40 million of them, that were stuck to the side of the box, but so many of the prizes were being stolen before they even hit the shelves that Cheerios had to start inserting the prizes inside the boxes. Two Japan companies provided prizes around the world in the 1960s and 70s, Toppan, with their "Top Stereo" brand, and Dai-Nippon.

=== Photographic lenticular printing ===
Lenticulars from the 1940s and 50s had been developed from drawings or cartoon images. In the 1960s, Eastman Kodak Company in Tennessee developed "Xograph" technology for photographing and printing 3D lenticular images. The first mass-produced ink-printed "parallax panoramagram" (a black and white 3D photograph of a bust of Thomas Edison) was published in Look Magazine on February 25, 1964, and sold 8 million copies. Look Magazine followed up with the first color 3D lenticular photograph on April 7, 1964. Optigraphics Corporation of Grand Prairie, Texas was formed in 1970 and—under the guidance of Victor Anderson, the inventor of the modern lenticular production process who worked well into his 80s—produced Kellogg's 3D Baseball Cards from 1970 to 1983. Optigraphics produced the lenticular prizes for Cracker Jack in the 1980s, 7-Eleven Slurpee lenticular sports coins from 1983 to 1987, and in 1986 it produced the first set of 3D traditional baseball cards marketed as Sportflics, which ultimately led to the creation of Pinnacle Brands. In 1999 Performance Companies bought Optigraphics after Pinnacle Trading Card Company went bankrupt in 1998.

== Prize manufacturers ==
=== Cloudcrest ===
C. Carey Cloud, sometimes called "year-round Santa Claus", was best known as a designer and producer of hundreds of different prizes for Cracker Jack from the 1930s through the 1960s through his company Cloudcrest. It is estimated that he created, produced, and delivered to the Cracker Jack Company 700 million toys. At the same time he designed hundreds of premiums for companies such as Brach's Confections, Breck Candy Company, Bunny Bread, Carnival Candies, CoCo Wheats, Johnston Candies and Chocolates, New Orleans Confections Inc, Ovaltine, Pillsbury flour, Post Bran Flakes, Shotwell of Chicago, Thinshell Candies, and more.

=== Nosco Plastics ===
Nosco Plastics, Inc. (commonly called "NOSCO", the mark used on its molded products) was the plastics molding division of National Organ Supply Company created in 1934 to make plastic parts for electric organs and was located at 1701 Gaskell Avenue, Erie, Pennsylvania, 16503. Beginning in 1948 with the implementation of the newly developed screw injection molding process, NOSCO quickly became a major early producer of tiny plastic toys called "slum" (very cheap prizes that are bought in bulk, sometimes for as little as $1 a gross or less) sold to wholesalers as carnival merchandise, used by the millions as prizes in packages of Cracker Jack popcorn confection, and mail-order flats that were heavily advertised in American comic books as "100 Toy Soldiers for $1" by E. Joseph Cossman & Company. NOSCO also held a number of patents on plastic molded products including mechanical toys, storage containers, pallets, and medical syringes. From 1948 through 1960, The Cracker Jack Company at 4800 West 66th Street, Chicago, Illinois, the largest toy buyer in the world at the time, used many millions of NOSCO toys as prizes in their caramel coated popcorn confection. These include the "Animal Stand-ups" (CJ Archive #Z-1111) that were marketed by the Levin Brothers — as well as the "100 Cowboys and Indians" set of 12 different figures (CJ Archive #Z-1137) and "3 Ring Circus" set of 12 different figures (CJ Archive #Z-1154) marketed as mail order items by Cossman & Levine. Other sets made by NOSCO for Cracker Jack include Alphabet Animals set of 26 (Z-1179), People (Occupations) Stand-ups (Z-1124), Spacemen Stand-ups set of 10 (Z-1227), a set of 16 double-sided Stand-ups (Z-1144), and Zodiac Coins set of 12 disks (Z-1182).

=== R&L plastics ===
Rosenhain and Lipmann Pty Ltd (commonly known as "R&L") was a plastics company in Melbourne Australia between 1954 and 1977. The company name is a fusion of the surnames of the founders Bruno Lipmann & Kurt Rosenhain. R&L designed and manufactured unique and innovative toys that became hugely popular both in Australia and in the United States., ultimately exporting them around the world. R&L started out making plastic hardware items. Its first product, a self-adhesive hook, was sold under an exclusive Australia license. Its hardware market was complemented by entry into the cereal box prize market with a flexible interconnecting plastic toy link "Flex-O-Link" in 1958. R&L's big breakthrough came with Stan Barton joining the firm as engineer, who conceived and developed the idea of miniature model kits, called snap-togethers — small plastic model kits that didn't need glue — issued in clear glassine bags, inside breakfast cereal boxes. They were used by companies such as Kellogg, Nabisco, Purina Grain Foods, and Sanitarium Health Food Company. Space Nits were found in retail packages of both Kellogg's cereals and Cracker Jack popcorn confection. During the company's 18-year run, over 70 different sets were released and it is estimated that about one billion R&L toys were delivered around the world. R & L's success was based upon unique toy designs and uncompromising engineering quality. However, the tide of success turned with the oil price shocks of the 1970s which sent the price of the raw material, plastic, up 300% in 5 years. Surprisingly too, the arrival of colour television saw cereal companies spend their marketing budgets on television advertising and not plastic inserts. Becoming unprofitable, R&L factory equipment and contents were sold off to a company in Mexico in 1977. This machinery was used to re-issue several series under the name "Tinykins". Although structurally the same, many colors varied and were brighter than the originals. The plastic and texture was also of a lesser quality. Tinykins flooded the market and are often mistaken for, or sold as, R&L originals.

== See also ==
- Baseball card
- Cereal box prize
- Chocopunch
- Cigarette card
- Cracker Jack
- Loyalty marketing
- Non-sports card
- Pep Cereal
- Perú Cola
- Pin-back button
- Premiums
- Sticker
- Tazos
- Temporary tattoo
- Trading card
