= Cosman =

Cosman is a surname. Notable people with the surname include:

- Douglas I. Cosman (born 1938), Canadian politician and businessman
- Felicia Cosman, American osteoporosis specialist
- Francene Cosman (born 1941), Canadian politician
- Jim Cosman (1943–2013), American baseball player
- Lilia Cosman (born 2007), Romanian-American artistic gymnast
- Madeleine Cosman (1937–2006), American academic, writer and activist
- Milein Cosman (1921–2017), German-born British artist
- Pamela Cosman, American computer and electrical engineer

== See also ==
- Cosman Citroen (1881–1935), Dutch architect
- Cosman Family Cemetery, New York
