= Milton Levine =

American entrepreneur

- Born: November 3, 1913; Pittsburgh, Pennsylvania, US
- Died: January 16, 2011 (age 97); Thousand Oaks, California, US
- Occupation: Entrepreneur

Milton Martin Levine (November 3, 1913 – January 16, 2011) was an American entrepreneur who was the co-founder of Uncle Milton Toys.

== Biography ==
He was born in Pittsburgh, Pennsylvania, on November 3, 1913, to Harry and Mary Levine; both were Russian Jews. As a young boy, Levine collected ants in a jar at his uncle's farm in Pennsylvania.

During World War II, he served in the European Theatre, where his engineer unit built bridges in France and Germany. While in France, he met his future wife, Mauricette (née Schneider), a citizen of the country. They married in 1945 and had one son and two daughters—all of whom Levine eventually put through college with the proceeds from his business.

After the war, he formed a partnership with his brother-in-law, E. Joseph Cossman, and entered the then-new world of plastic and the toy industry that was predicted as a growth industry. The duo made arrangements with Nosco Plastics, a division of National Organ Supply, that also manufactured the plastic prizes in Cracker Jack to make flat toy soldiers for mail order that they advertised originally as "100 Toy Soldiers for $1" (later $1.25) that was advertised in nearly every American comic book of the time.

Levine and Cossman also successfully mass marketed the potato gun, toy shrunken heads to hang from rear-view windows, and balloon animals.

In 1956, while at a Fourth of July picnic at his sister's pool, he spotted a mound of ants. This inspired him to found Uncle Milton's Toys, which is best known for its Uncle Milton's Ant Farm. After recalling his childhood collection of ants, he said, "We should make an antarium." The original ant farms were sold for $1.29 and came in a six-by-nine-inch ant farm. Business boomed after advertisements in after-school programs prompted thousands of shipments a week. Levine thought of the name of the company by saying, "Someone said that if I've got all these ants, then I must be the uncle."

After the child bought the ant farm, they had to mail a request for a shipment of 25 ants, which arrived in a vial a few weeks later. The ants on the farm are the species Pogonomyrmex californicus, a native of the southwestern US. At the time of his death, over 20 million units had been sold, with a growth rate of 30,000 units per month. He once said about the success of his business in 1991: "Most novelties, if they last one season, it's a lot. If they last two seasons, it's a phenomenon. To last 35 years is unheard of."

Levine died of natural causes on January 16, 2011, in Thousand Oaks, California, at the age of 97. He is interred at Hillside Memorial Park in Culver City, California.

== Books ==
- Uncle Milton's Ant Facts and Fantasies (1970)
- How I Made $1,000,000 in Mail Order-and You Can Too! (1993)
