= Willy Benda =

German cellist

Willy Benda (5 October 1870, Vevey – 18 August 1929, Bielefeld) was a German cellist and conductor. In 1890s he lived in Scotland being a professor of piano, cello and accompaniment at the Athenaeum School of Music. He also conducted the amateur orchestra Greenock with more than 60 performers. For one year (1898) he participated in the Kosman String Quartet.

In 1907 he was called from Charlottenburg to Bielefeld to become the director of the Bielefeld Konservatorium.
