= Pin-back button =

Ornament or badge for wearing, as on a lapel, often with a slogan or image

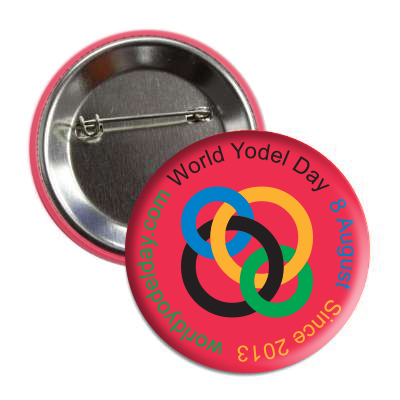
The back and front of a pin-back button for World Yodel Day

A pin-back button or pinback button, pin button, button badge, or simply pin-back or badge, is a button or badge that can be temporarily fastened to the surface of a garment using a safety pin, or a pin formed from wire, a clutch or other mechanism. This fastening mechanism is anchored to the back side of a button-shaped metal disk, either flat or concave, which leaves an area on the front of the button to carry an image or printed message. The word is commonly associated with a campaign button used during a political campaign. The first design for a pin-back button in the United States was patented in 1896, and contemporary buttons have many of the same design features.

== History ==
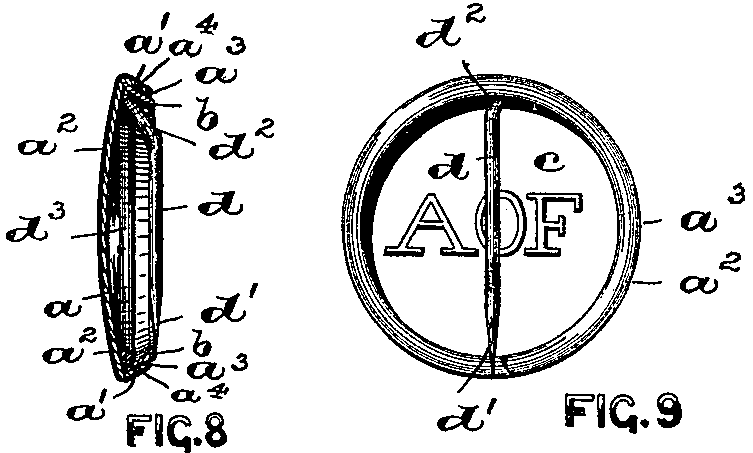
Badge Pin or Button, US patent (1896)

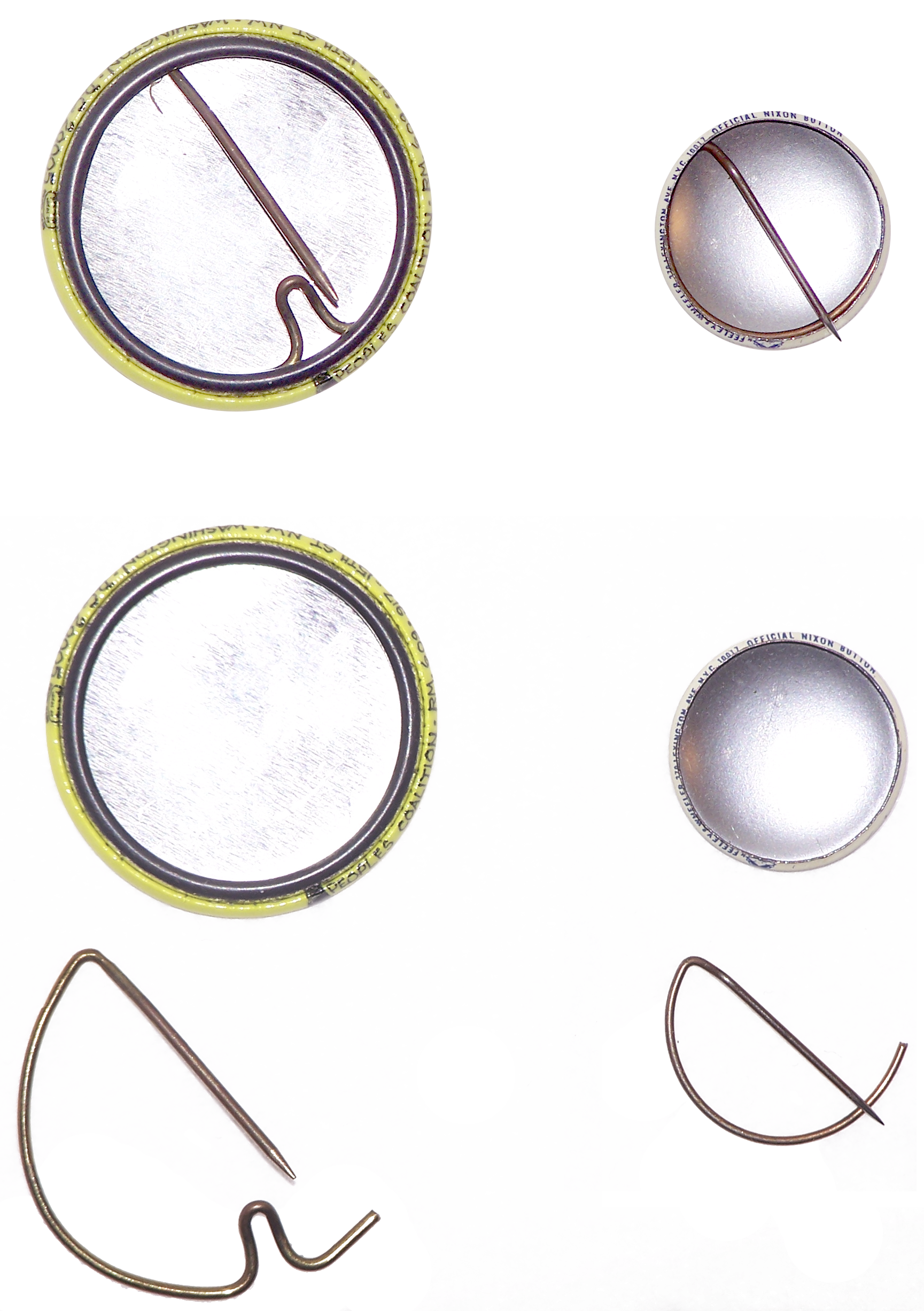
Two assembled pin-back buttons (top) and disassembled (bottom) with two different wire pins

Buttons have been used around the world to allow people to promote or advertise their political affiliations personally.

In 1787 Josiah Wedgwood of the Wedgwood pottery dynasty ordered the production of the Wedgwood anti-slavery medallion to promote the British anti-slavery movement to the House of Commons. This is believed to be the first use of a slogan on a product and a forerunner of today's political campaign button. The original was a stamp for wax but Wedgwood later reproduced the image as a porcelain cameo.

In the United States since the first presidential inauguration in 1789, George Washington's supporters wore buttons imprinted with a slogan. These early buttons were sewn to the lapel of a coat or worn as a pendant on a string. Some of the earliest campaign buttons to feature photographs were produced to promote the political platform of Abraham Lincoln in 1860.

Benjamin S. Whitehead patented the first innovation to the design in 1893 by inserting a sheet of transparent film made of celluloid over a photograph mounted on a badge to protect the image from scratches and abrasion. Whitehead had patents for various designs of ornamental badges and medallions previously, patented as early as 1892. Another patent was issued to Whitehead & Hoag on 21 July 1896 for a "Badge Pin or Button" which used a metal pin anchored to the back of the button to fasten the badge.

My present invention has reference to improvements in badges for use as lapel pins or buttons, or other like uses, and has for its primary object to provide ... a novel means for connecting the ornamental shell or button to the bar or pin for securing the badge to the lapel of the coat.

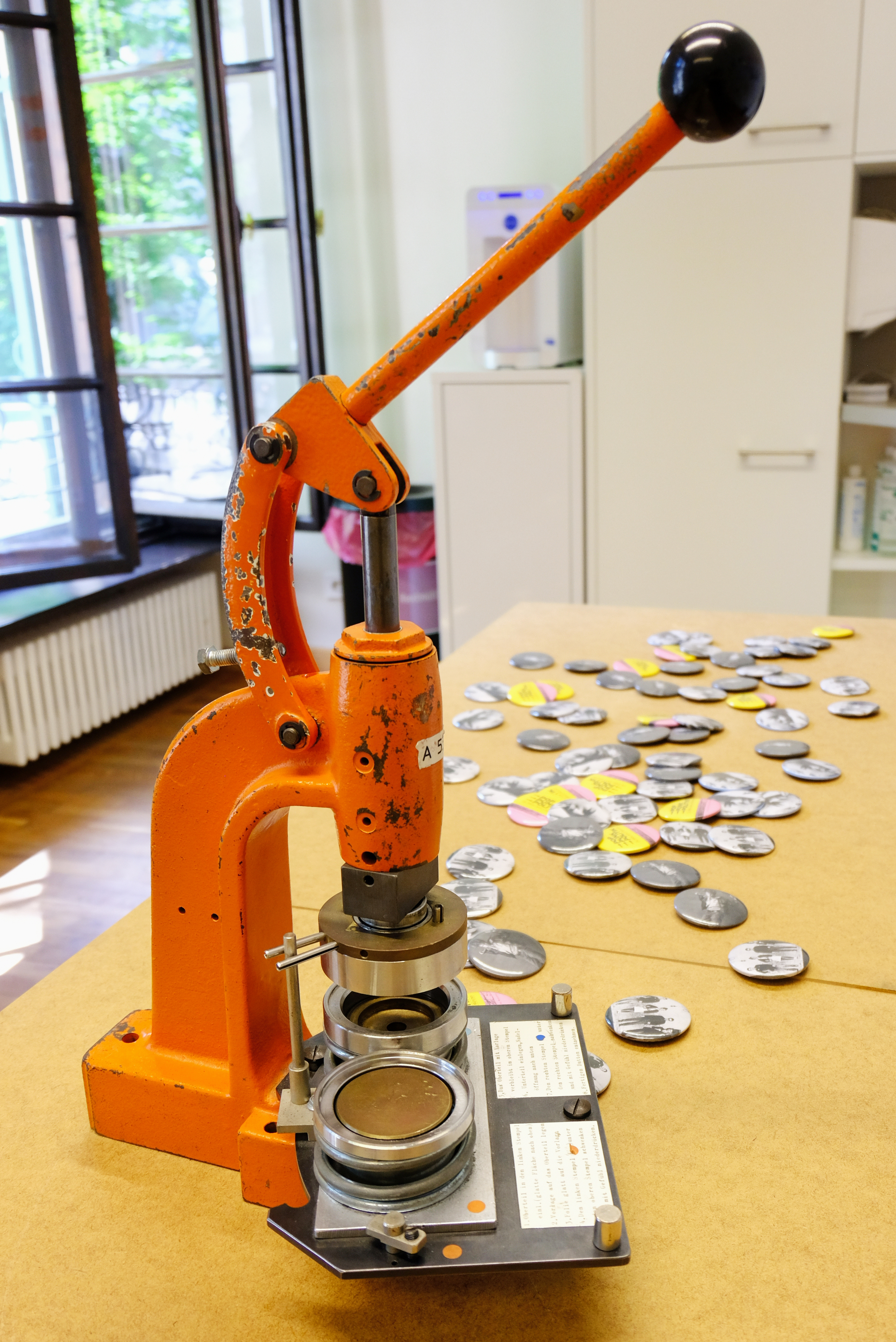
Badge making machine. To make a badge, components are stacked at the bottom and manually pressed together into one piece with the lever on top.

Other improvements and modifications to the basic design were patented in the following years by other inventors. Early pin-back buttons from 1898 were printed with a popular cartoon character, The Yellow Kid, and offered as prizes with chewing gum or tobacco products to increase sales. These buttons were produced with a concave opening on the back side (which provided space to insert advertising), or with a closed back, filled with metal insert and fastener. These are called "open back" and "closed back" buttons.

Beginning with lapel pins and then followed by the pin-back button, both Americans and Europeans quickly adopted pins as a form of identity and pride of a group, movement or individual. In the late 1800s, British royalists would often wear lapel pins to signify their allegiance to the British monarchy. This crept into other western cultures in the early 1900s, namely America and its politics. These pins even spawned an entire industry, William McKinley is often credited with the first successful mass marketing campaign using campaign buttons during the 1896 election. American politicians did wear pins before this, but they weren't used as a form of marketing with voters. According to The Smithsonian, portrait buttons became increasingly popular as politicians were recognisable due to photos in newspapers and could be easily identified. This form of self-identification and marketing use rapidly spread into other industries beyond politics.

In the 1930s, American corporations began to experiment with smiling faces in advertising. One such company was Chevrolet, who at the time had a heated rivalry with Ford and launched the 1931 campaign "Keep Your Eye on Chevrolet". They used pinback buttons as part of this campaign, which featured a yellow happy face character, which looks remarkably similar to modern day emoticons as it isn't smiling but is winking and has expression on its face.

In 1945, the Kellogg Company, the pioneer in cereal box prizes, inserted prizes in the form of pin-back buttons into each box of Pep Cereal. Pep pins have included U.S. Army squadrons as well as characters from newspaper comics. There were 5 series of comic characters and 18 different buttons in each set, with a total of 90 in the collection. After the end of WWII (and in some cases during it), Americans would wear pin badges to identify their allegiance to a cause or group. This became so important to American culture it has since received special coverage in the National Museum of American History. The rise in pin buttons exploded after the second world war. Buttons were even used by the now legendary Martin Luther King as a form of communication. Some sources have suggested that potentially hundreds of millions of buttons were produced annually. As far back as 1903, American Tobacco Company had placed an order to produce 1 million pin back buttons a day, demonstrating the scale at which buttons could have been produced.

The button then became the medium for a long-running debate on who created the smiley. Many commentators pointed to Harvey Ball's early design in the 1960s, while others have criticised Ball, suggesting existing designs on buttons existed long before his. The Button Museum in Chicago for example, has made similar claims that buttons in their collection likely pre-date Ball's version. It also has a category on its website, dedicated to smiley buttons.

== Reception ==
In 2024, the United States Postal Service released a stamp series commemorating pin-back buttons (video).

== See also ==
- Badge
- Campaign button
- Lapel pin
- Prizes
- Promotional merchandise
- Safety pin
