= Cosman Family Cemetery =

Historic cemetery in New York, United States

- U.S. National Register of Historic Places
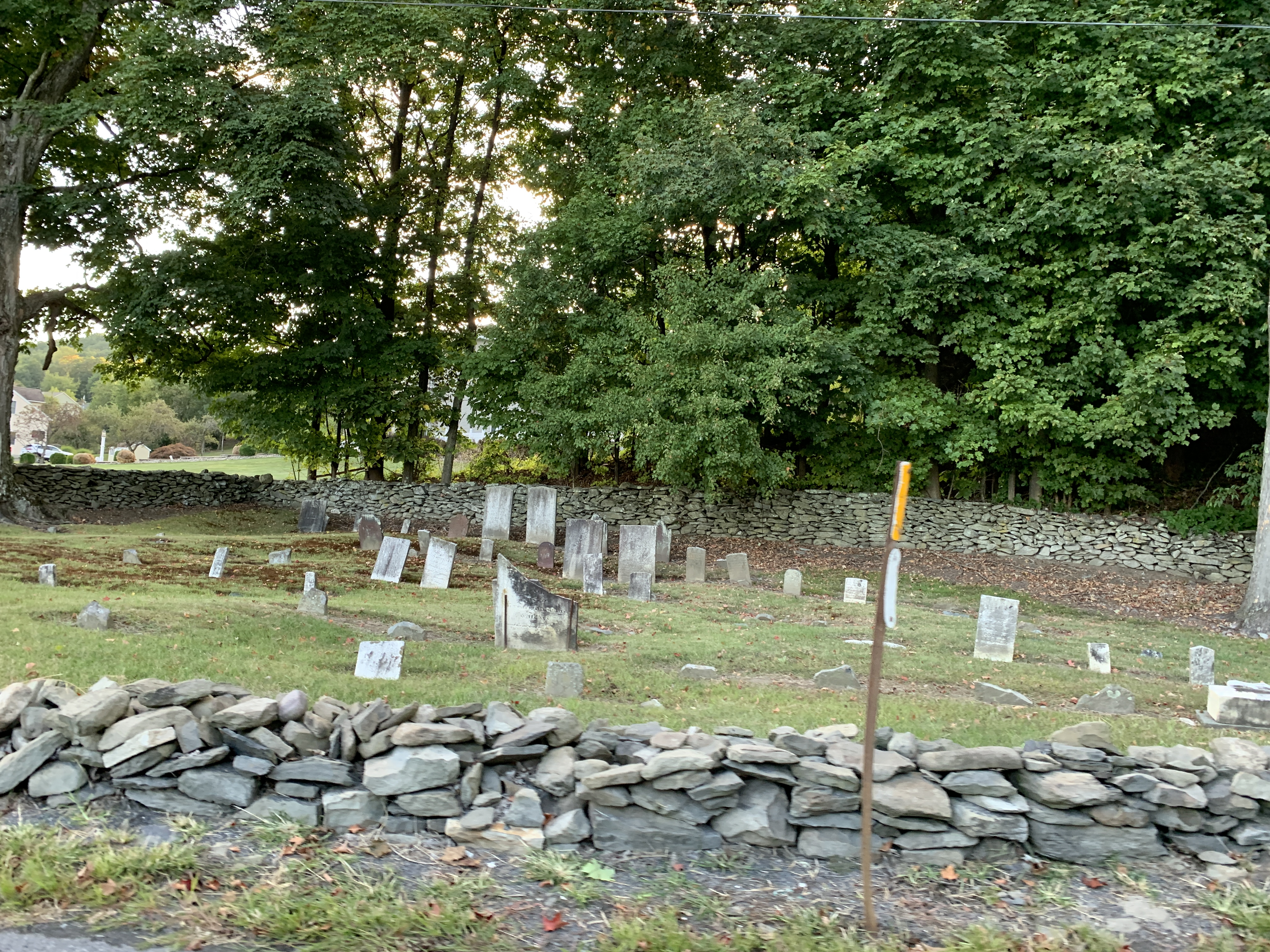

- Location within New York Location within the United States
- Location: Lattintown Rd., Middle Hope, New York
- Coordinates: 41°34′54″N 74°0′22″W
- Area: less than one acre
- NRHP reference No.: 06001002
- Added to NRHP: November 8, 2006

Cosman Family Cemetery is a historic family cemetery located near Middle Hope, New York, which is near Newburgh in Orange County, New York. The cemetery is the last feature remaining from the Cosman farmstead established in the mid-18th century. It contains approximately 50 graves dating from about 1801 to 1930.

It was listed on the National Register of Historic Places in 2006.
