= Spud gun =

Small toy gun used to fire a fragment of potato

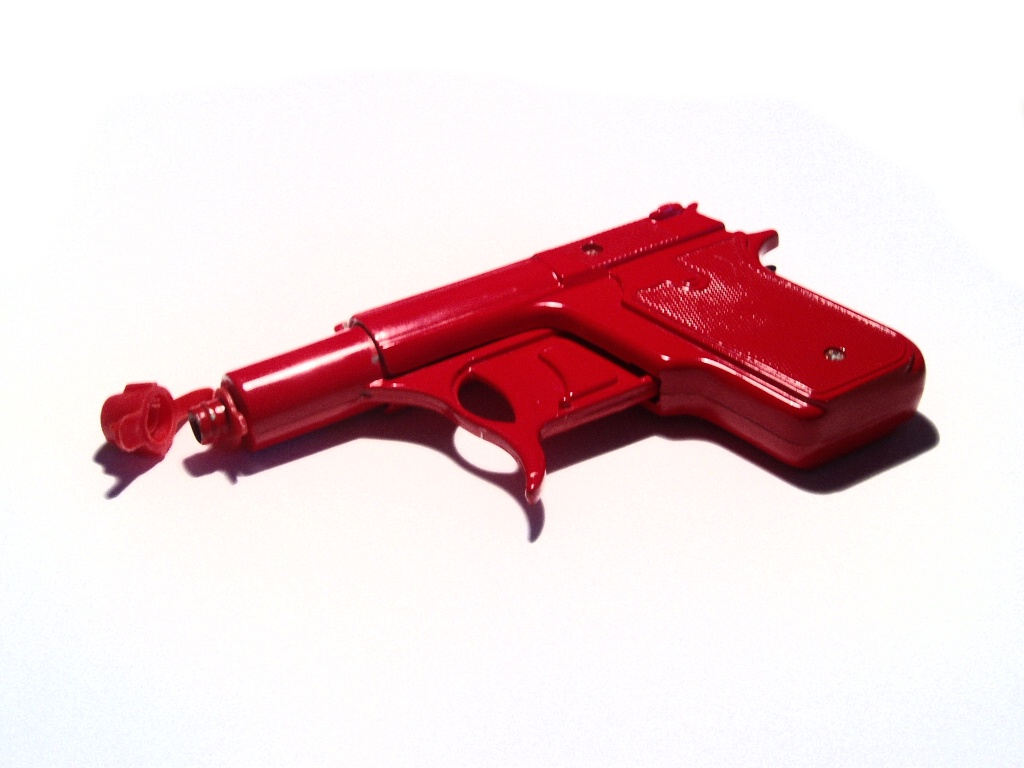
A typical factory-made toy die-cast spud gun. The cap attached to the muzzle converts it into a water pistol.

A spud gun or potato gun is a small toy gun used to fire a fragment of potato. To operate, one punctures the surface of a potato with the gun's hollow tip and pries out a small pellet which fits in the muzzle. Squeezing the grip causes a small build-up of air pressure inside the toy which propels the projectile. The devices are usually short-range and low-powered.

== Early history ==
The first spud gun was invented during the Great Depression. The original inventor sold his patent to E. Joseph Cossman for US$600 after World War II. Cossman, the brother-in-law of "Uncle" Milton Levine, sold two million spud guns in six months as a result of an advertising campaign.

In Mexico City a company named WELCO created a similar model of a spud gun with a metallic appearance. Tomas Welch, a Mexican Jewish chemical engineer, developed a spud gun named "TIRA PAPAS" (Spanish for "potato shooter").

== See also ==
- BB gun
- Slingshot
