= Premium (marketing) =

Promotional item that can be received as part of marketing

In marketing, premiums are promotional items — toys, collectables, souvenirs and household products — that are linked to a product, and often require proofs of purchase such as box tops or tokens to acquire. The consumer generally has to pay at least the shipping and handling costs to receive the premium. Premiums are sometimes referred to as prizes, although historically the word "prize" has been used to denote (as opposed to a premium) an item that is packaged with the product (or available from the retailer at the time of purchase) and requires no additional payment over the cost of the product.

Premiums predominantly fall into three categories, free premiums, self-liquidating premiums and in-or on-package premiums. Free premiums are sales promotions that involve the consumer purchasing a product in order to receive a free gift or reward. An example of this is the ‘buy a coffee and receive a free muffin’ campaign used by some coffee houses. Self-liquidating premiums are when a consumer is expected to pay a designated monetary value for a gift or item. New World's Little Shopper Campaign is an example of this: consumers were required to spend a minimum amount of money in order to receive a free collectible item. The in-or out-package premium is where small gifts are included with the package. The All Black collectors’ cards found in Sanitarium Weet Bix boxes are a good example of this.

A successful premium campaign is beneficial to a company as it aids in establishing effective consumer relationships. A good campaign will:

- strengthen early-stage consumer relationships
- encourage continued repeat business
- assist with targeting a specific audience or cohort of your target market
- create an emotional connection with your consumer by serving as a motivational driver to investigate further or purchase a product.

It's also important not to confuse premiums with other forms of sales promotions as there are a number of ways in which retailers can entice consumers.

== History ==
=== Early premiums ===
A merchant in Sudbury, New Hampshire, started giving out tokens made of copper when a customer made a purchase in 1793. The customer could then exchange the tokens for products in the store. This practice caught on and was used by many merchants throughout the 19th and 20th Century. Sweet Home laundry soap, a product of the B. A. Babbit Company, came with certificates that could be collected and redeemed for color lithographs. Beginning in 1872, the Grand Union Tea Company gave tickets to customers that could be exchanged for merchandise in the company catalog of Grand Union stores. The first trading stamps were introduced in 1891, the Blue Stamp Trading System, where stamps affixed to booklets could be redeemed for store products.

=== The business of premium redemption ===
The Sperry and Hutchinson Company, started in 1896 in Jackson, Michigan, was the first third-party provider of trading stamps for various companies, including dry goods dealers, gas stations and later supermarkets. S&H Green Stamps, as the company was commonly called, opened its first redemption center in 1897. Customers could take their filled booklets of "green stamps" and redeem them for household products, kitchen items, and personal items. World War II put the trading stamps premium business on hold for a while, but when the G.I.s returned, the economy was robust, and the trading stamps business took off like a storm when numerous third-party companies created their own trading stamp programs to offer to supermarkets and other retailers. The bottom fell out of the trading stamp business in 1965, when supermarkets stopped issuing stamps altogether and started spending more money to advertise lower prices. Trading stamps have gone by the wayside of the modern retail marketing method of loyalty cards used widely in supermarkets where, instead of premiums, customers benefit from savings and convenience through coupon-free discounts.

=== Children's premiums ===
Kellogg's Corn Flakes had the first cereal premium with The Funny Jungleland Moving Pictures Book. The book was originally available as a prize that was given to the customer in the store with the purchase of two packages of the cereal. But in 1909, Kellogg's changed the book give-away to a premium mail-in offer for the cost of a dime. Over 2.5 million copies of the book were distributed in different editions over a period of 23 years.

At the beginning of the Second World War, radio was a big player in the promotion and distribution of premiums, usually toys that were closely related to the radio program. There were many radio shows that offered premiums to their listeners, but Captain Midnight was one of the best known. The early sponsor of Captain Midnight was Skelly Oil, and parents could get forms to mail-in for radio premiums at the gas stations. Later, Ovaltine became the sponsor of Captain Midnight, and it continued the premiums through advertising on the labels and foil tops of Ovaltine that could be collected to exchange for Captain Midnight premiums and offering membership to the "Secret Squadron".

=== Premiums hit home ===
Betty Crocker products, owned by General Mills, had one of the best-known premium programs when the company started inserting coupons in bags of flour in 1929 which consumers could collect and use to purchase Oneida flatware at a reduced price. In 1932, the popular coupon program was improved so that consumers could redeem coupons for an entire set of flatware — the pattern was called "Friendship". Beginning in 1937, the coupons were printed on the outside of the box with point values and could be redeemed through the Betty Crocker Catalog in exchange for cookbooks, kitchenwares, and home accessories, as the box tops stated, for 25 to 75 percent savings. To avoid confusion with cents-off coupons, the premium program was renamed "Betty Crocker Catalog Points" in 1992. General Mills retired the Betty Crocker Catalog in December 2006 and ended the premium program after 75 years. (Now that the premium program is no longer in effect, consumers can clip "Box Tops for Education" that are printed on Betty Crocker products to help schools pay for educational supplies.)

== Premiums in the 21st century ==
Premiums have come a long way since the 19th century and although they are rarely referred to as “premium campaigns”, the concept itself is still very much relevant to today's marketing professionals. Let's look at New World's Little Shopper promotion implemented by Foodstaffs in 201. The promotion called for customers to spend a minimum of $40 in store, in order to receive one of 44 free mini grocery items. The grocery items were identical, miniature replicas of actual products found within the supermarket. The brands of the products in which were represented in the campaign had paid Foodstaffs to be included.

In taking this approach, Foodstaffs created an opportunity for its suppliers to also take advantage of brand encounters targeting consumers who may not have necessarily been aware of their products. The use of persuasive communication techniques, i.e., television and radio advertisements created positive attitude changes amongst shoppers who may not have necessarily been loyal to a particular supermarket, aiding the company to expand their consumer reach and market share. The Little Shopper promotion also created a buzz amongst the younger generations with reports of parents succumbing to the ‘pester-powers’ of their child's fear of missing out.

The return on investment for the Little Shoppers ‘premiums’ campaign was as much tangible as it was financial. It also left a lasting impression on consumers even after the campaign had closed. Media reported on countless social media posts and TradeMe listings from consumers attempting to buy or swap the collectables in order to complete their set. The promotion also led to creative spin-offs with consumers upcycling the miniature products for wearable art competitions, again expanding Foodstaffs consumer reach.

The Little Farmers of Kissanpur is another highly successful premium campaign run by the Indian Ketchup brand Kissan. The campaign placed 22nd on the 2015 WARC list of the world's 100 best marketing campaigns. The brands tagline ‘made with real tomatoes’ was brought to life inside the consumer's home. By redesigning the products packaging to be more effective and of use to the consumer, the company designed a new bottle top. The new bottle top included tomato seeds in which consumers were encouraged to plant in order to grow their own Kissan tomato plant. In addition to providing the means to grow your own plant, Kissan followed up with a competition giving children who grew the best plants the opportunity to feature on the bottles. WARC reported that consumption of the brand grew to over 2.5 times the rate of the category.

== Legality ==
Whilst the law in the United States and the United Kingdom governing premiums is relatively lax, it is comparatively stricter in several other countries. Belgium, Germany, and Scandinavia have strict consumer protection laws regulating the use of premiums. In Argentina, Austria, Norway, and Venezuela, the law governing premiums is so strict that they are effectively banned. In Japan, the value of a premium is restricted to being no more than 10% of the value of the product that is purchased in order to obtain it. In Finland, it is illegal to describe a premium as a free gift. In France, premiums may not be made conditional upon the purchase of a third product.

== See also ==
- Loyalty marketing
- Pepsi Stuff
- Radio premium
- Trading stamp
