= Felicia Cosman =

American orthopedic surgeon

Felicia Cosman is the Professor of Clinical Medicine at Columbia University College of Physicians and Surgeons in New York City, NY. She is an osteoporosis specialist and was a clinical scientist at Helen Hayes Hospital in West Haverstraw, New York. Dr. Cosman is the recipient of multiple research grants from the NIH, the Department of Defense, the National Multiple Sclerosis Society, and multiple pharmaceutical companies. She has published 155 peer-reviewed papers and 50 book chapters, and acted as an NIH grant reviewer, associate editor for several journals, and the co-editor-in- chief of Osteoporosis International. Her major research focus over the last decade is the use of teriparatide, a bone building medication, in combination with antiresorptive agents, and in novel cyclic regimens, in the treatment of severe osteoporosis.

Her research has focused on the causes of osteoporosis and how the female hormone estrogen and drugs called SERMS work to treat osteoporosis. She also is studying experimental treatments for osteoporosis, including parathyroid hormone, and the causes of stress fractures in military cadets.
