= Crater Critters =

Cereal box toy set

Crater Critters was a set of eight plastic toys that were made by an Australian company, Rosenhain and Lipmann and given away inside Kellogg's cereal boxes in 1968 and again in 1972.

== History ==
The definitive history on breakfast cereal toys and the industry itself was written by Craig L Hall in the book Breakfast Barons, Cereal Critters and the Rosenhain & Lipmann Legacy 2002. This was a first history of the industry based upon original research and interviews with the cereal company employees and plastics firm Rosenhain & Lipmann P/L. Between 1959 and 1977, an Australian company based in Melbourne called Rosenhain and Lipmann (commonly known as R&L) designed and manufactured unique and innovative toys that became hugely popular both in Australia and overseas. R&L started out making snap-together items that worked like tiny plastic model kits that didn't need any glue and were issued in a clear glassine bag, inside Kellogg's cereal boxes. Between 1959 and 1977, over 70 different sets were released and it is estimated that about one billion R&L toys were delivered around the world.

The most popular and collectable of any series was Crater Critters. Kellogg's advertised Crater Critters as friendly bug-eyed creatures from the craters of outer space. Originally issued in 1968, the set was so popular R&L reissued them again in 1972. The set of eight Crater Critters (Kingly, Kindly, Kooky, Curly, Creepy, Clever, Cranky and Crawly) were produced in eight different colours. The four most common colours were orange, lilac, dark purple and lime green (all depicted below). Of the eight Critters, two had removable parts; Kingly Critter who had a removable four point black crown and Kooky Critter who had a removable black top hat. Kingly Critter with a four spikes on the crown intact is extremely rare and often fetches upwards of $200 on eBay. In 2006, one sold on eBay for $450.

In the United States and United Kingdom, they were also known as Crater Critters, but issued under different names (shown in brackets below).

Kingly Critter (King)	Kindly Critter (Lunartic)	Kooky Critter (Upsy Downsy)	Curly Critter (Jodrell Jim)	Creepy Critter (Bugsy Backbone)	Clever Critter (Gloob)	Cranky Critter (Miss Venus)	Crawly Critter (Glubber)

== Tinykins ==
Becoming unprofitable, R&L factory equipment and contents was sold off to Mexico in 1977. This machinery was used to re-issue the Crater Critters series under the production name "Tinykins". Although structurally the same, many colours varied and were brighter than the originals. The plastic and texture was also of a lesser quality. Tinykins flooded the market and are often mistaken for, or sold as, R&L originals.

== See also ==
- Lego Space (Spyrius)
