= Kosman String Quartet =

Ensembles founded by Elkan Kosman

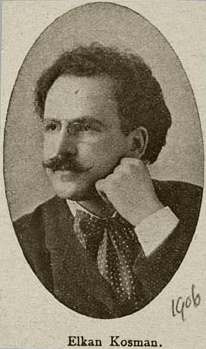
Elkan Kosman ca.1906

The Kosman String Quartet is a name for two different ensembles founded by the violinist Elkan Kosman.

The first one was founded in Scotland in 1898. Its members were: Elkan Kosman (first violin), Richard Dalblitz (second violin), John Daly (viola) and Willy Benda (cello). The last was replaced the next year by Adolf Schmid, the principal cellist of the Scottish orchestra.

By 1901 Kosman was already in the US and founded a string quartet in Philadelphia, This included: Elkan Kosman (first violin), Edwin Brill (second violin), Howard Rattay (viola) and Rudolph Hennig (cello).
