= Cereal box prize =

Toys or small prizes offered as incentives to buy breakfast cereals

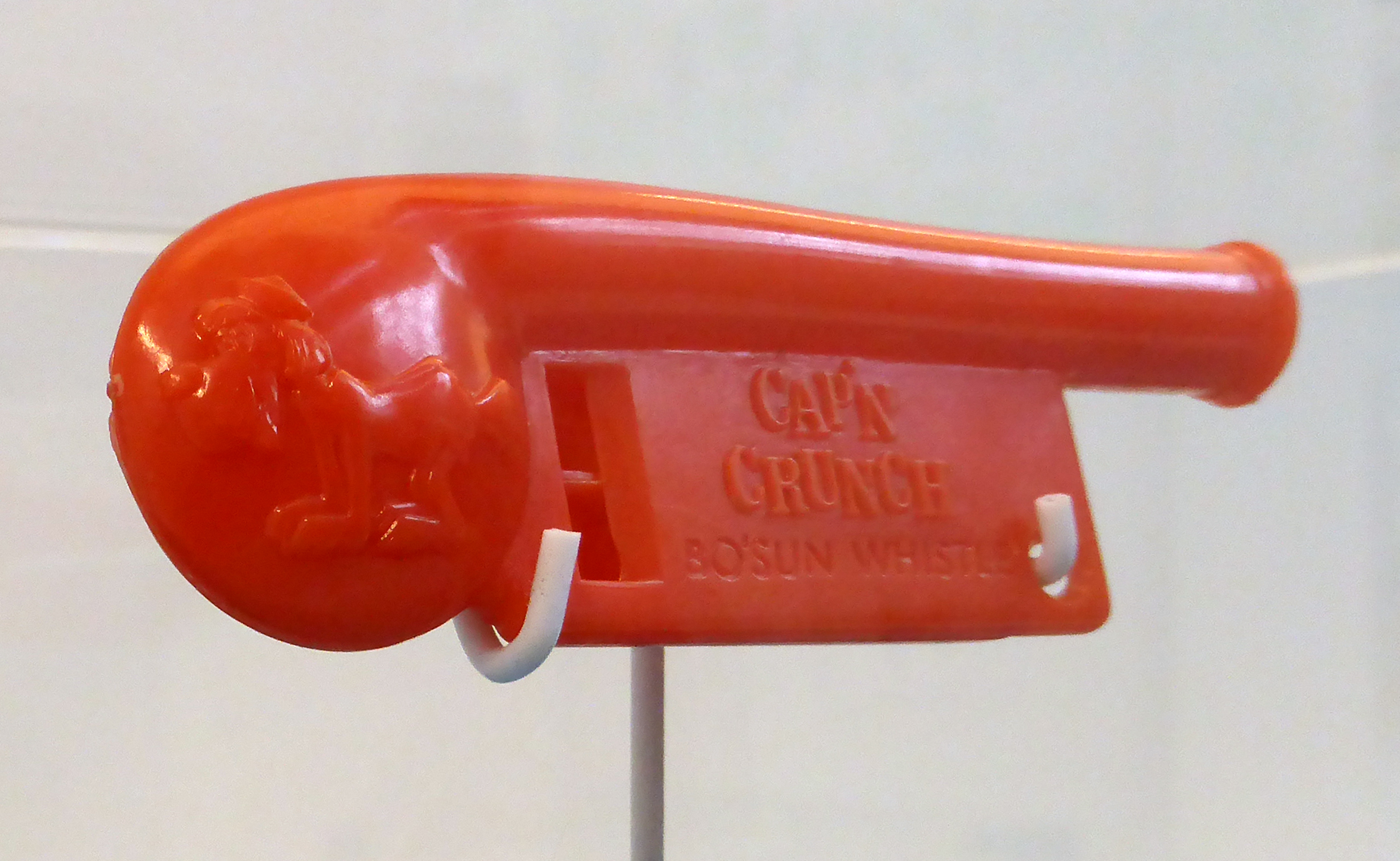
This cereal box prize, distributed in boxes of Cap'n Crunch, is a toy bosun's whistle. It was later used by phreakers to experiment with and exploit telephone networks, as it produces a specific tone used for automatic telephone switching.

A cereal box prize, also known as a cereal box toy in the UK and Ireland, is a form of advertising that involves using a promotional toy or small item that is offered as an incentive to buy a particular breakfast cereal. Prizes are found inside or sometimes on the cereal box. The term "cereal box prize" is sometimes used as a broader term to also include premiums that can be ordered through the mail from an advertising promotion printed on the outside of the cereal box.

== Distribution ==
Cereal box prizes and premiums have been distributed in four ways. The first, not frequently used now, was an in-store (or point-of-sale) prize that was handed to the customer with the purchase of one or more specified boxes of cereal. The second method of distribution is to include the prize in the box itself, usually outside the liner bag—often called an "in-pack promotion" in retail marketing. The third method is attaching the prize to the box - "on-pack" promotion - (as with plastic records laminated to the back of the box) or printing the prize on the box (as with numerous games and trading cards) or simply attaching the prize to the box with tape or shrink wrap. Some prizes include a gameboard or other interactive activity printed on the box that corresponds with the prize inside the box, which is used as a gamepiece. The fourth method of distribution is to have the consumer mail in the UPC proof-of-purchase labels cut from a specified number of boxes, sometimes with a cheque or money order to defray the cost of shipping, and the premium is sent to the consumer by mail (rarely first-class), usually from a third-party source.

== History ==
W.K. Kellogg was the first to introduce prizes in boxes of cereal. The marketing strategy that he established has produced thousands of different cereal box prizes that have been distributed by the tens of billions.

Kellogg's Corn Flakes had the first breakfast cereal prize. The Funny Jungleland Moving Pictures Book was given to customers in stores by merchants at the time of purchase of two packages of Kellogg's Corn Flakes. In 1909, Kellogg's changed the book give-away to a premium mail-in offer for the cost of a dime. By 1912, Kellogg's had distributed 2.5 million Jungleland books. The book underwent various edition changes and was last offered to consumers in 1937.

In 1945, Kellogg inserted a prize in the form of pin-back buttons into each box of Pep cereal. Pep pins have included U.S. Army squadrons as well as characters from newspaper comics. There were five series of comic characters and eighteen different buttons in each set, with a total of ninety in the collection. Kellogg’s 3D Baseball and Football Cards produced by Optigraphics were a big hit from 1970 to 1983 in packages of Kellogg's cereals, initially Corn Flakes and later other brands. A popular and collectable series was Crater Critters.

In 1997, General Mills packaged game CDs for Chex Quest, a Chex-themed conversion of Doom in Chex cereal boxes.. The promotion was successful and lead to other cereal brands including videogames in their cereal boxes. Age Of Empires, Rollercoaster Tycoon and the original game Cap'n Crunch's Crunchling Adventure were among the games included.

== Technical advances ==
The invention of a screw injection molding machine by American inventor James Watson Hendry in 1946 changed the world of cereal box prizes. Thermoplastics could be used to produce toys much more rapidly, and much more cheaply, because recycled plastic could be remolded using this process. In addition, injection molding for plastics required much less cool-down time for the toys, because the plastic is not completely melted before injected into the molds. Hendry also developed the first gas-assisted injection molding process in the 1970s, which permitted the production of complex, hollow prizes that cooled quickly. This greatly improved design flexibility as well as the strength and finish of manufactured parts while reducing production time, cost, weight, and waste.

== See also ==
- Feelie
- Promotional merchandise
- Showbag

== Bibliography ==
- Bruce, Scott (1998). Cereal Boxes and Prizes, 1960s : A Tribute and Price Guide. Chamblee, Ga.: Flake World Publishing. ISBN 0-9662123-0-4.
