= Formicarium =

Vivarium which is designed primarily for the study of ant colonies

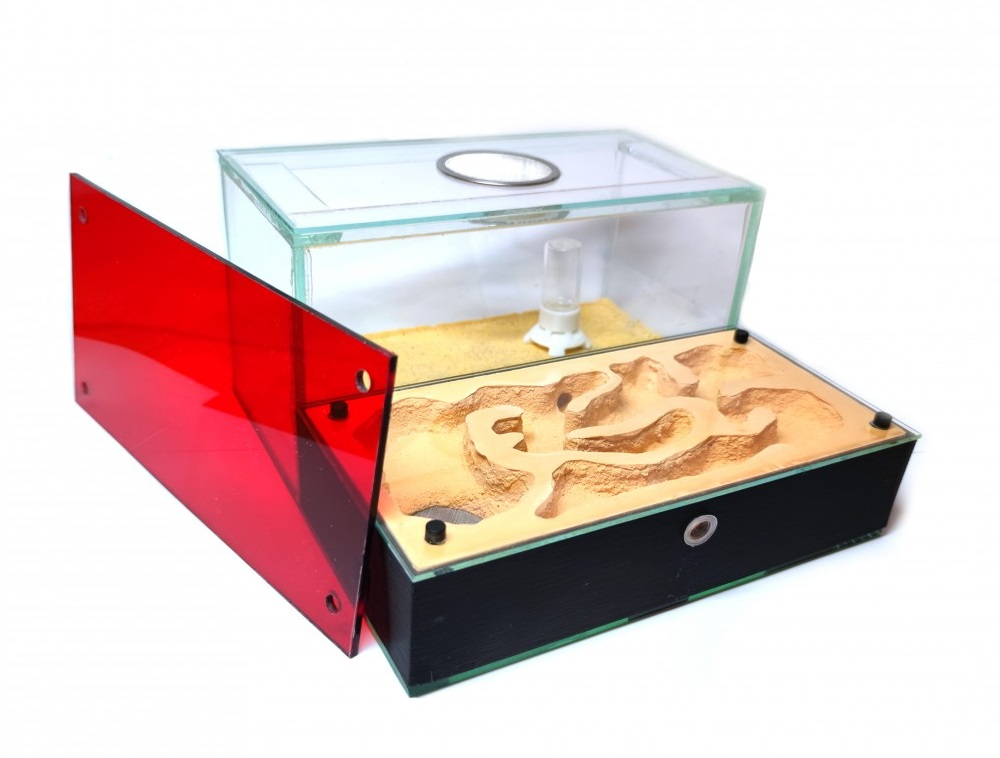
Formicarium made of plaster and an effective escape barrier

A formicarium (pl.: formicaria or formicariums) or ant farm is a vivarium which is designed primarily for the study of ant colonies and how ants behave and for the enjoyment of ants as pets. Those who study ant behavior are known as myrmecologists.

== History ==
The formicarium was invented by Charles Janet, a French entomologist and polymath, who had the idea of reducing the three dimensions of an ant nest to the virtual two dimensions between two panes of glass. His design was exhibited in the 1900 Exposition Universelle in Paris. Janet's invention was recognized by his promotion to Chevalier (Knight) of the Legion of Honour, but he did not obtain a patent for, nor attempt to market his creation.

The first commercially sold formicarium was introduced around 1929 by Frank Eugene Austin (1873–1964), an inventor and professor at the Thayer School of Engineering at Dartmouth College. Austin received a patent for his formicarium on June 16, 1931, as well as further patents for its continued development. Austin included whimsical painted or wooden scenes of palaces, farms and other settings above the ground level.

In 1956, Milton Levine, founder of Uncle Milton Industries, created his own version of a formicarium, reportedly independently from Frank Austin. Levine got the idea when attending a Fourth of July picnic. Levine registered the term ant farm for his product and registered it as a trademark. Austin himself may not have used this term; in his patents, the formicarium is described as an “educational apparatus” and a “scenic insect cage.” A 1936 magazine article about Austin’s invention referred to the structure as an “ant palace.”.

Levine's "Ant Farm" trademark received notoriety in 1995 when Scott Adams used the phrase in a Dilbert comic and received threatening letters from Uncle Milton Industries' attorneys, demanding a retraction for the unauthorized use of the phrase. Adams satirized the incident in a later comic strip, in which Dilbert asked for a substitute phrase for "a habitat for worthless and disgusting little creatures", to which Dogbert replied "law school".

== Materials ==
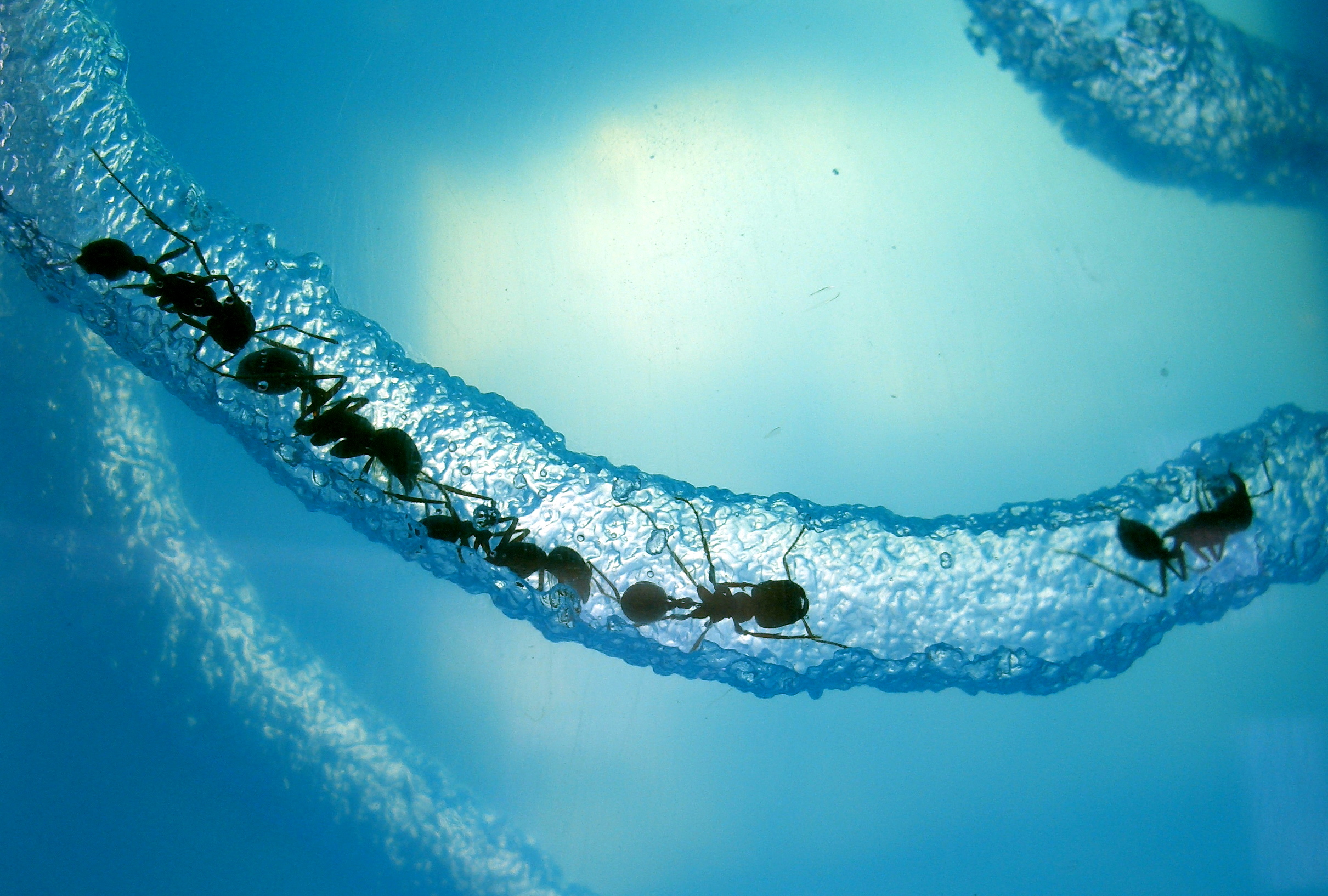
Closeup of ants and tunnels within a gel formicarium

Most formicarium types now available on the market are either made of acrylic (plastic) or 3D printed. These are superior to the 'sandwich' type formicarium as there is no chance of tunnel collapse, and they are designed more specifically to keep queen ants with workers, whereas the 'Milton' type nests were only designed to house worker ants.

A 'sandwich' formicarium is usually a transparent box made of glass or plastic, made thin enough so that the tunnels and cavities made by the ants can be seen and their behaviour can be studied. The fill material is typically soil, loam, sand, vermiculite, other mineral fragments or sawdust.

Formicariums containing gel that act both as fill material and partially food are available. However, they do not provide the ants with adequate housing and nutrition for the long term and in some instances, they can actually be poisonous to the ants. The formula and nutritional content of gels vary, but for worker-only colonies they tend to only contain sugar or agar plus preservatives. Most gels are colored blue.

Other types of formicaria are those made with plaster, autoclaved aerated concrete (AAC) or simply with no medium. Plaster nests can be made by placing modeling clay on a glass panel in the form of tunnels and chambers. The plaster is poured onto the mold, and when the plaster dries, the clay is removed and the remaining structure can be used for housing ants. The ants in this type of formicarium are very easily seen. Mediumless formicaria may be in any container, with the ants staying in moist test tubes or other small containers. This also allows for better visibility.

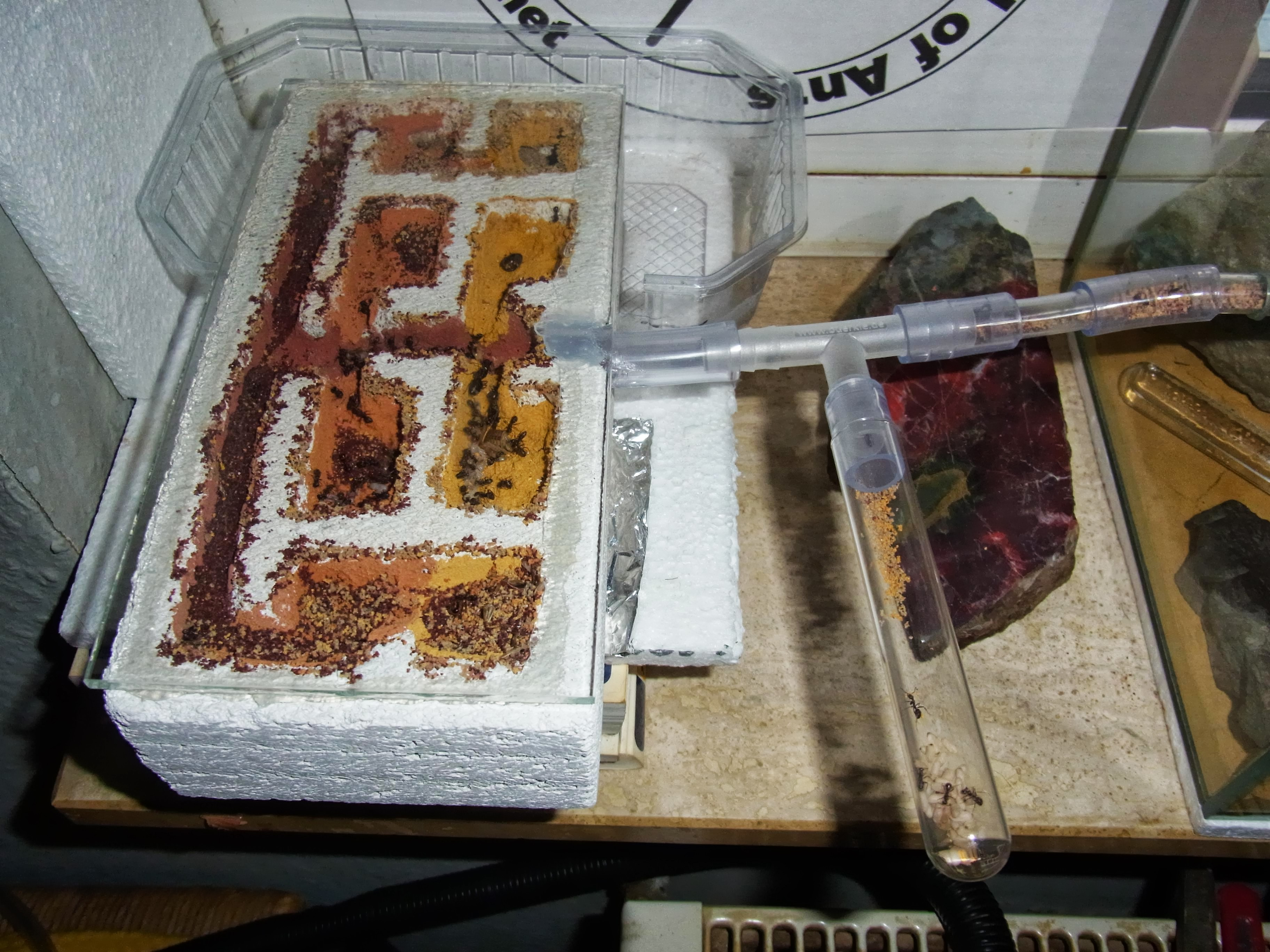
Formicarium with multiple connected sections

A formicarium can be designed to be free-standing, and not enclosed or lidded like a vivarium. A free-standing design does not require high walls and a lid, but rather relies on barriers to secure the ants within their habitat.

Containing ants inside a formicarium can be a challenge. Several substances are used to repel the ants, including anti-escape oil, petroleum jelly or liquid PTFE, which are applied to the side of the formicarium to prevent escape, as most ant species cannot walk on these slippery or sticky surfaces. Despite this, some species of ants can build bridges of debris or dirt on the substance to escape, while in other species some individual ants can walk on the substance without impedance. Formicarium owners often make use of two or more security measures. Another escape-prevention technique involves placing the entire formicarium in a shallow container of water, creating a moat.

Some ant-keepers choose to put their ants into a 'test tube outworld' before a formicarium as this allows them to keep the colony comfortable and safe within their test tube whilst also allowing them a foraging area.

== Laws on keeping ants ==
In the United States, it is usually illegal to ship live queen ants across state lines without a permit, and most ant farms sold in the US contain no queens. Professional ant shops and suppliers may ship ants only within the state where they reside unless they contain a permit for the species they want to ship.

In the European Union, some domestic species are protected, and it is illegal to own, keep, buy, or sell these ants, or to damage their nests. Unlike reptiles and spiders, there are no laws on owning, keeping, buying, or selling tropical ants. Most formicaria are designed to house queen ants; professional ant shops and suppliers usually sell their colonies with queens.

== See also ==
- Ant-keeping
- Ant robotics
- Instant Fish
- Sea-Monkeys
- SimAnt
- Mexican jumping bean
