= Trade card =

Type of business card

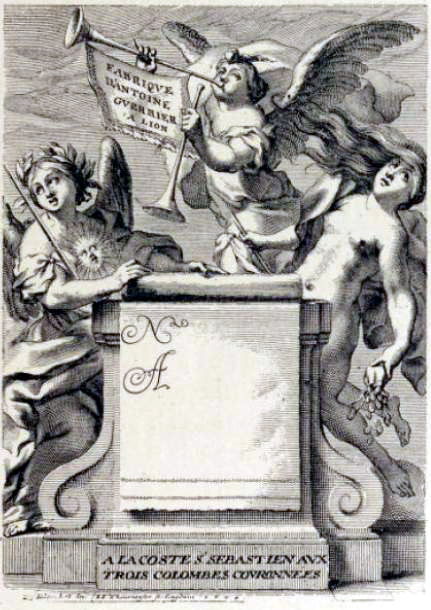
One of the oldest trade cards, printed in Lyon and designed by Thomas Blanchet in 1674 for the firm of Antoine Guerrier

A trade card is a small card, similar to a visiting card, formerly distributed to advertise businesses. Larger than modern business cards, they could be rectangular or square, and often featured maps useful for locating a business in the days before house numbering. They first became popular at the end of the 17th century in Paris, Lyon and London.

== Definition ==
The term, trade card, refers to a varied group of items made of paper or of card of varying sizes and shapes. Trade cards evolved in different ways in Britain, America and Europe, giving rise to wide variation in their format and design. The characteristic features of a trade card are that it is a small printed item, used by merchants and traders to give to their customers for their use as an aid to memory. Trade cards were sufficiently small so that they could be carried in the gentleman's pocket or lady's purse.

== History ==
In its original sense, the "trade" in trade card refers to its use by the proprietor of a business to announce his trade, or line of business. Trade cards were widely used by retailers and tradesmen from around the late 17th century in Paris, Lyon and London. In the period before mass media, they functioned as advertising and also as maps, directing the public to the merchants' stores (no formal street address numbering system existed at the time). The trade card is an early example of the modern business card. The use of trade cards in America became widespread from the mid-19th century in the period following the Civil war.

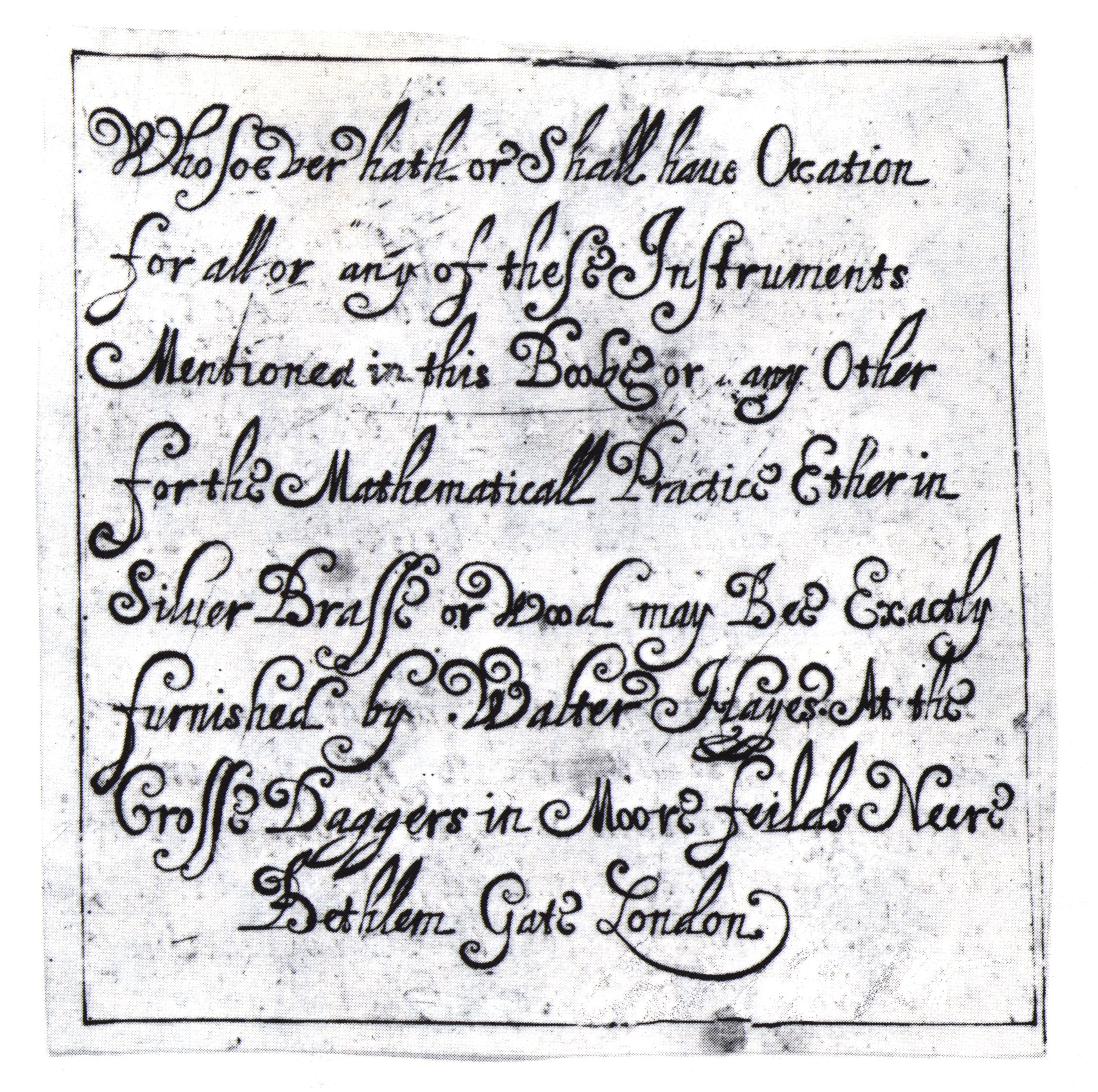
An early trade card, about 1650, with text and no illustrations. From the collection of the Science Museum, London

The earliest trade cards were not cards at all, instead they were printed on paper and did not include illustrations. Later they were printed on the more substantial card and typically bore the tradesmen's name and address, and before street numbering was in common use, often included a long-winded set of directions on how to locate the store or premises. With the advent of commercial engraving and lithography, illustrations became a standard feature of even the most humble trade card. Eventually trade cards evolved into business cards, which are still in use today.

Eighteenth century traders wanted cards with impact and sophistication. Accordingly, they often hired notable designers and engravers to design their cards. In 1738, for instance, when leading Parisian art dealer Edme-François Gersaint changed the name of his business to A la Pagode, he hired the engraver, François Boucher to design his card. In 1767, the French painter Gabriel de Saint-Aubin designed a trade card for quincailler (ironmonger), Perier, whose premises were situated at the sign of the Moor's Head on the Quai de la Megisserie in Paris. Other artists who accepted commissions for trade cards included: Hogarth, Bartolozzi and Bewick. The demand for trade cards, and also for catalogs fuelled demand for creative services such as etching, engraving and print-making in the first half of the eighteenth century.

Examples of early trade cards

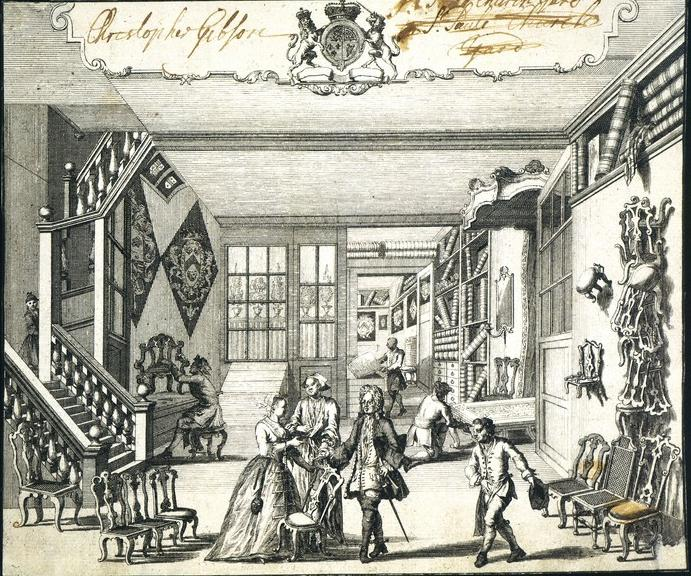
Trade card for a London furniture store, 1730–1742

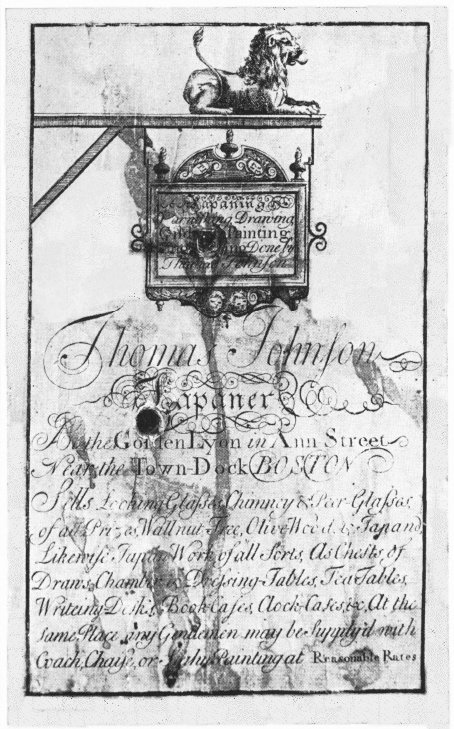
Trade card for Thomas Johnston, Japaner of London, 1732

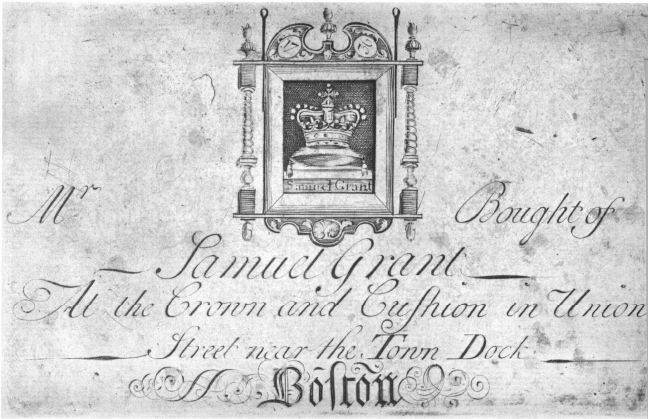
Trade card Samuel Grant of Boston, 1736

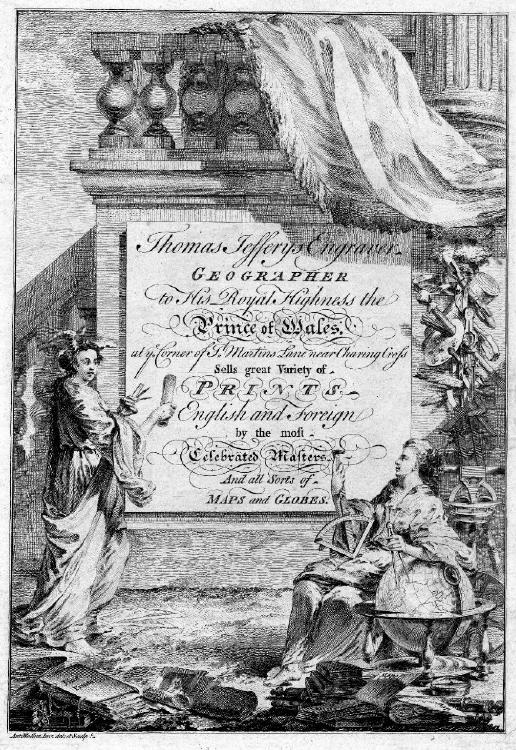
Trade card of Thomas Jeffreys, 1750

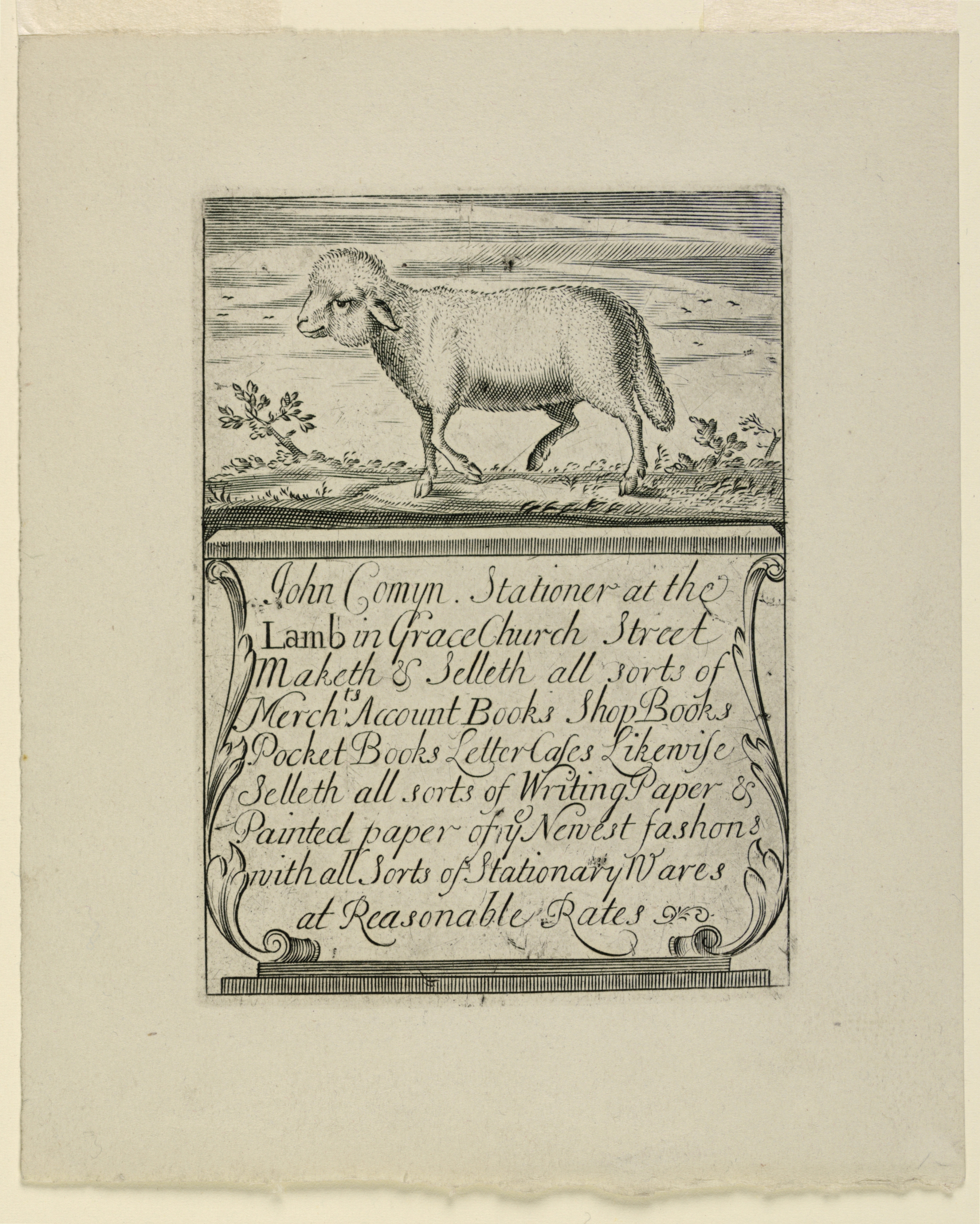
Trade card for John Comm, London stationer, c. 1750

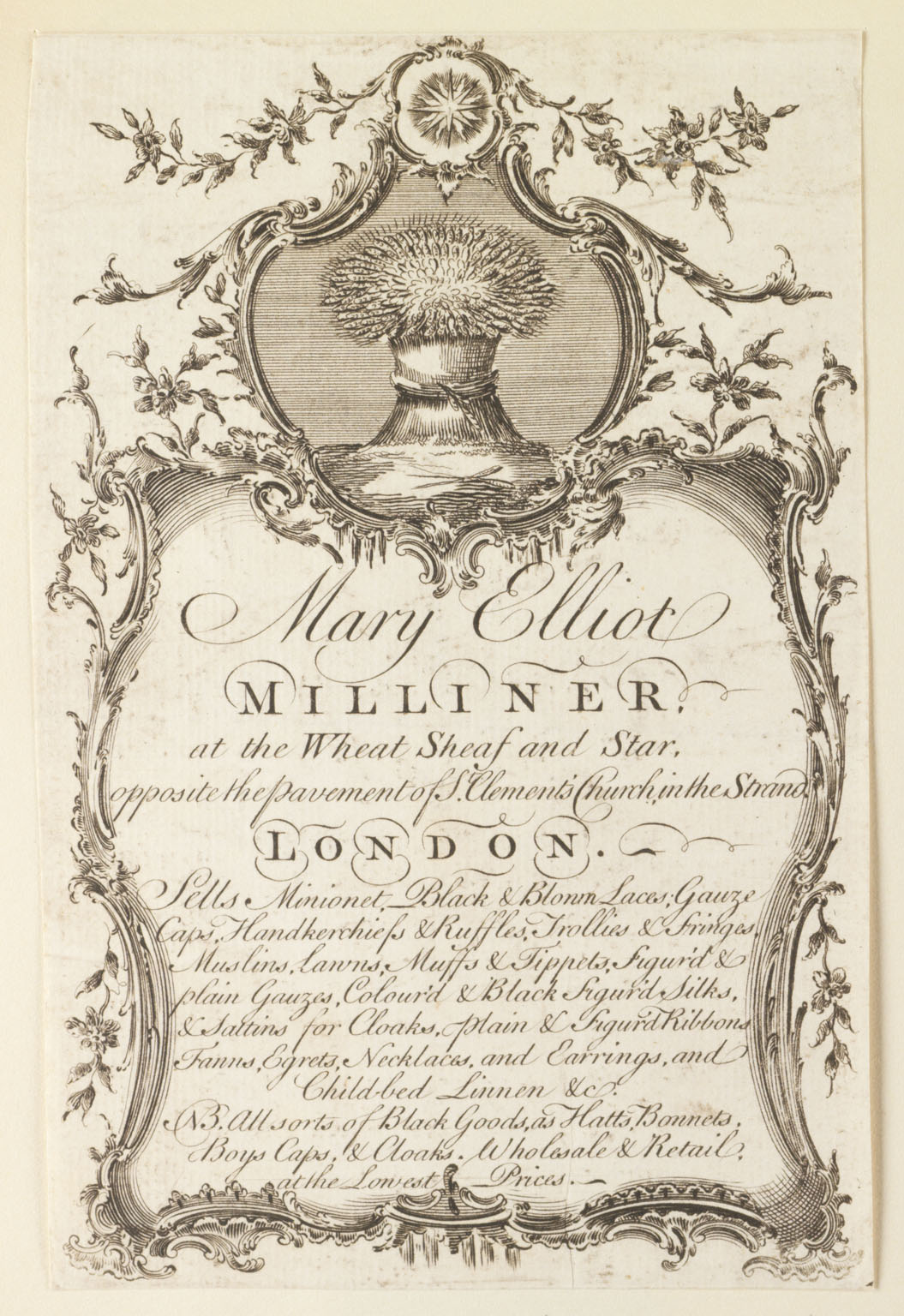
Trade card for Mary Elliott, milliner, 1757

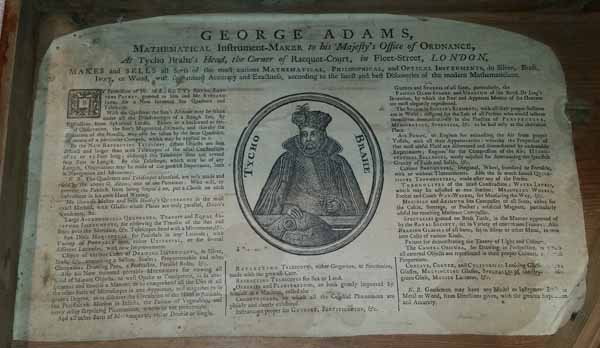
Trade card for George Adams, instrument maker, date unknown, before 1773

Fuelled by the advent of color lithography and multi-color printing, trade cards entered their heyday in the late 19th century. Businesses began to create increasingly sophisticated designs, using color printing. A few American companies specialized in producing stock cards, usually with an image on one side and space on the other side for the business to add its own information. In around 1850, Aristide Boucicaut, the founder of the department store Au Bon Marché used color printing to great effect when he seized on the idea of using the new chromolithography to offer a weekly advertising color print to children accompanied by their parents. This plan was so successful that it was soon emulated by other Parisian department stores. Cards for La Belle Jardiniére and La Galerie Lafayette soon followed.

The attractive and colorful designs spawned a passion for collecting trade cards, which became a popular hobby in the late 19th century. By moving into the realm of collecting, trade cards gave rise to the trading card, the meaning now shifting to the exchange or trade of cards by enthusiasts. Some cards, particularly those produced by tobacco companies featuring baseball players, later developed into collectibles and lost their function as a business advertisement.

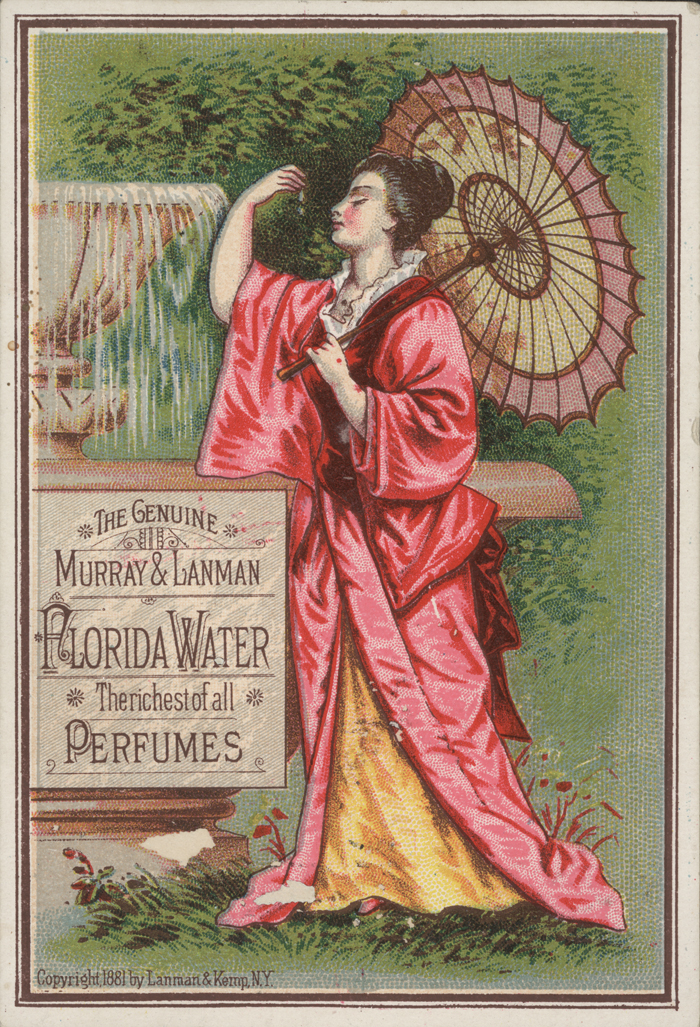
Lithographed trade card advertising Murray & Lanman Florida Water Cologne

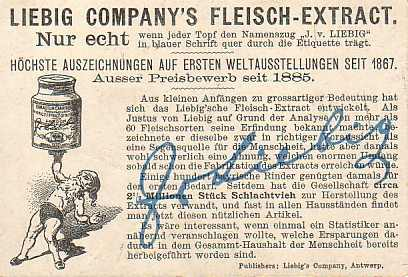
Back of a German Liebig Extract of Meat Trade Card from 1885

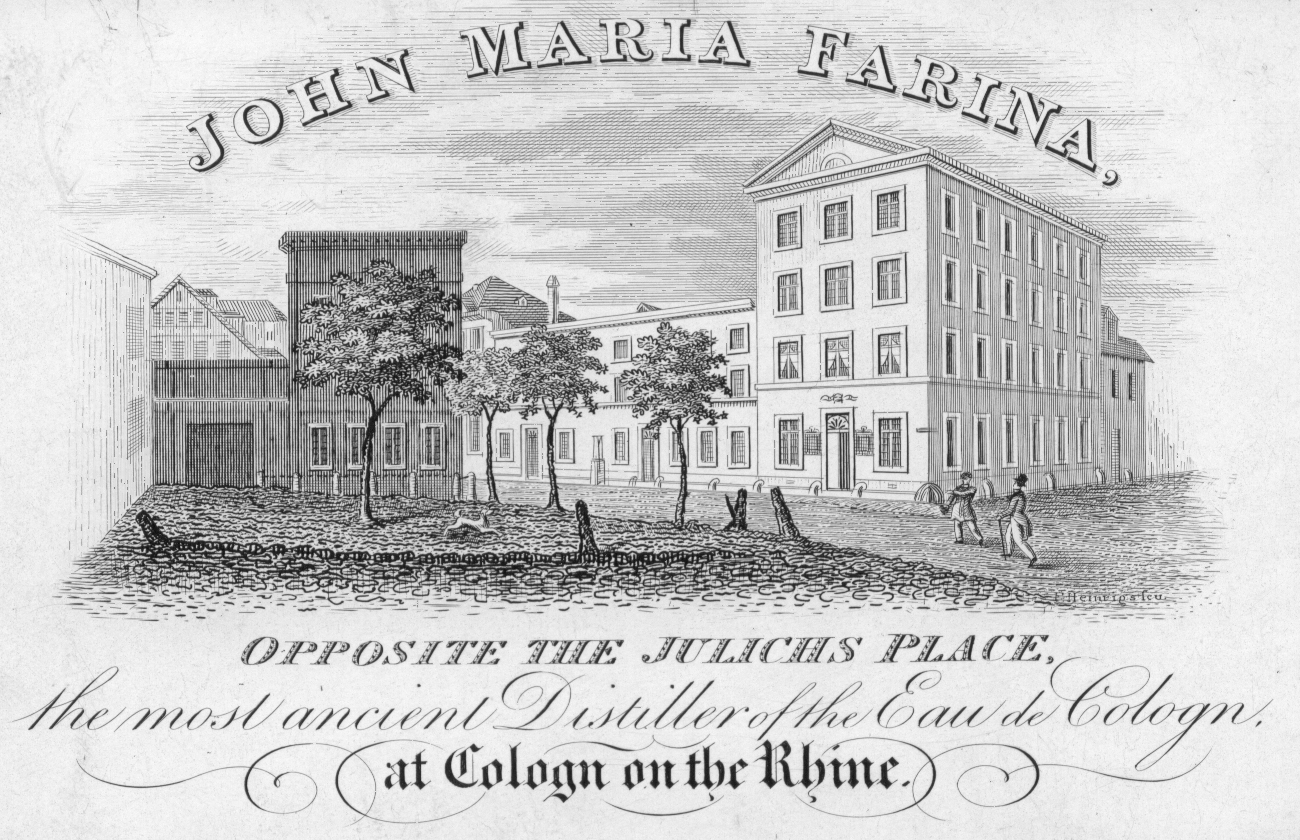
Early 19th-century English-language trade card of John Maria Farina, cologne manufacturer, showing Farina Haus, Köln

The interest in collecting trade cards has ensured that many examples have survived. Collections of rare trade cards, dating from the 17th century to the 19th century can be found at the British Library, Bodleian Library, Oxford, and Waddesdon Manor, Buckinghamshire. Another important collection of medical trade cards is the Wellcome Collection.

== See also ==
- Advertising postcard
- Baseball card — the earliest baseball cards were trade cards
- Carte de visite
- Cigarette card — a type of trade card packaged in tobacco products
- Postcard
- Prizes — trade cards were some of the earliest "prizes" packaged in retail products
- Trading card — successors of trade cards
- Pokémon Trading Card Game - Popular trading card game people collect since 1996
- Yu-Gi-Oh! Trading Card Game - Started in 1999 and popular trading card game since then.
- Disney Lorcana Collectible Card Game - Created in 2023 featuring Disney characters.
- Magic: The Gathering Card Game - A 1993 collectible card game that is still very popular in the 2020s.
