= Joinson =

Joinson is a surname. Notable people with the surname include:

- Adam Joinson (born 1970), British cyberpsychologist
- Suzanne Joinson (fl. 2025), British novelist and memoirist
