= PromoJam =

- Industry: Social media marketing
- Founded: June 2009
- Founder: Matt MacNaughton and Amanda MacNaughton
- Headquarters: Venice, California, United States

PromoJam is a social media marketing technology platform for businesses to build, launch and track promotions that reach new customers on the popular social networks. PromoJam utilizes word-of-mouth marketing and peer to peer recommendations to help drive customer acquisition.

== History ==
PromoJam is a social media marketing technology founded in June, 2009. PromoJam was developed to help brands maximize their online visibility and social media reach through social media promotions. PromoJam originated as a Twitter-only promotion builder platform, and has since expanded its service to include Facebook, MySpace and Tumblr social network integrations. In 2011, PromoJam released PromoJam-GO!, a mobile social media marketing platform that utilizes QR codes to engage offline and online consumers.

== Service ==
There are two service levels — PromoJam Do It Yourself, which runs Twitter promotions, and PromoJam Enterprise, which runs promotions across a variety of social media networks.

== Company ==
PromoJam is developed and owned by parent company, CultureJam, Inc. and is based out of Venice, California. CultureJam was founded by Matt MacNaughton and Amanda MacNaughton in 2008. PromoJam received $1.2m fund in a Series A round by Golden Seeds in March 2012.
