= Rob Markey =

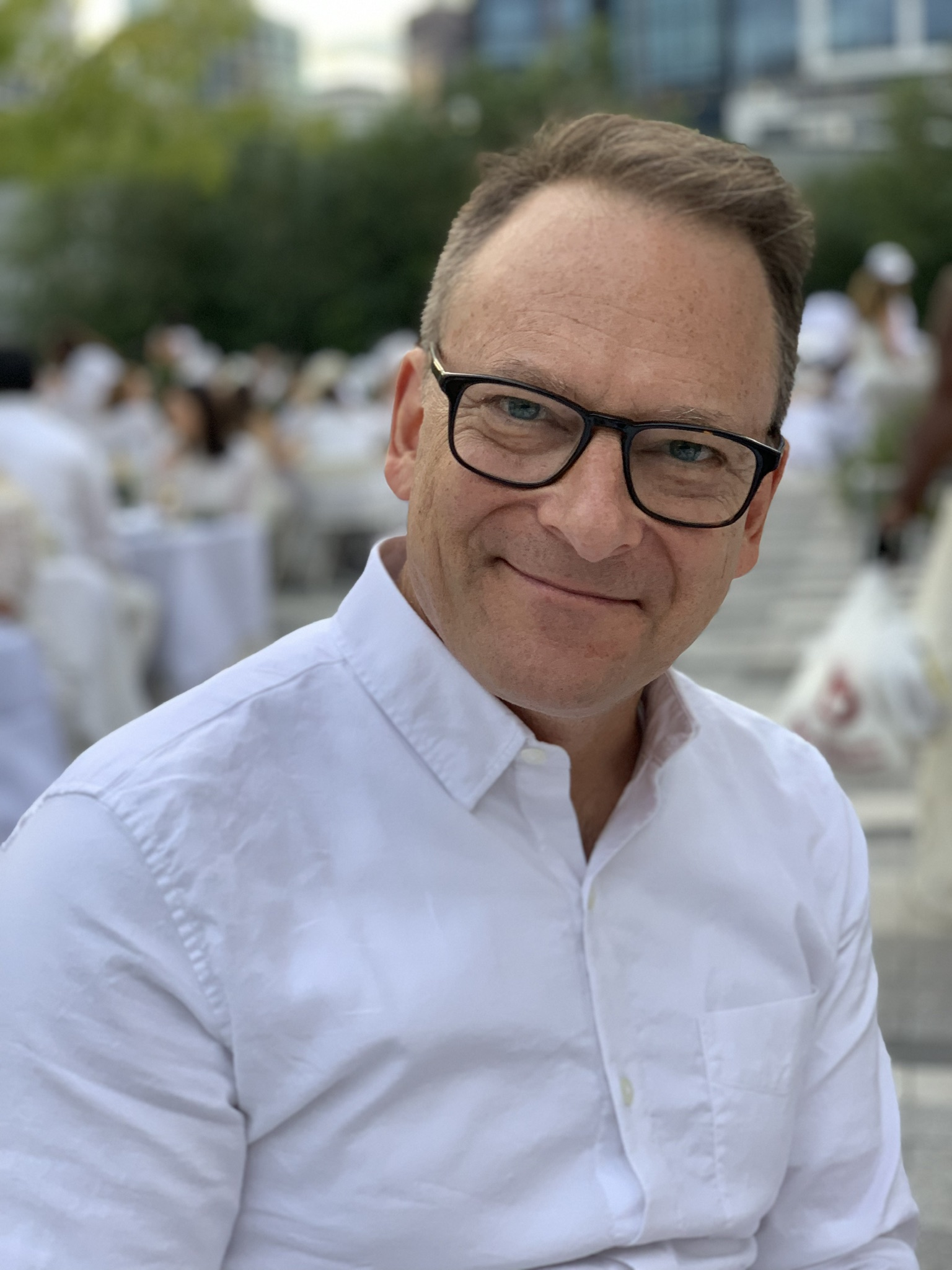
- Rob Markey in 2019
- Born: Cleveland, Ohio
- Education: A.B., Brown University MBA, Harvard Business School
- Occupations: Author, speaker, strategy consultant
- Employer(s): Bain & Company
- Notable work: The Ultimate Question 2.0, 2011, Harvard Business School Press
- Website: https://www.bain.com/our-team/rob-markey/

Rob Markey (born 1964) is an American author, speaker, and business strategist. Often referred to as the Vince Lombardi of Customer Loyalty, he is perhaps best known for his research and writing on customer experience and loyalty marketing. Markey is also the co-creator of the Net Promoter System of management (NPS), along with fellow Bain & Company consultant Fred Reichheld.

== Early life ==
Markey was born and grew up in Cleveland, Ohio. He graduated with a B.A. from Brown University (1986) where he served as the Editor-in-Chief of the Critical Review. Markey received his MBA from Harvard Business School (1990).

Markey was named a Strnad Fellow at his alma mater, University School in 1982.

== Writing ==
His published articles have appeared in business publications, including two magazine articles and 19 digital articles for the Harvard Business Review. He speaks on loyalty and other business topics at management conferences and similar events. His work on loyalty and customer experience has been covered in The Wall Street Journal, New York Times, Financial Times, Fortune, Business Week and The Economist.

His most recent article, "Are You Undervaluing Your Customers?" argues for measuring and managing the value of a company's customer base, and for creating accounting standards for reporting customer metrics.

His most recent book, The Ultimate Question 2.0: How Net Promoter Companies Thrive in a Customer-Driven World, was a New York Times Bestseller and co-authored by long-time collaborator, Fred Reichheld of Bain & Company. The book focuses on Net Promoter Score (NPS), a concept Reichheld developed based on his research in measuring customer satisfaction, customer retention and its link to revenue growth and profitability. This metric serves as an indicator of the loyalty and advocacy customers show for a company. In this book, Markey and Reichheld elaborate what they term the "Net Promoter System" which builds on the metric and incorporates business processes used by the companies they write about to improve customer experience for their customers.

== Professional ==
Markey is a partner in the management consultancy Bain & Company, where he has worked since 1990. He founded the firm's customer strategy and marketing practice, and led it from 2000 through 2018.

Markey is also a professor at Harvard Business School, where he teaches an MBA course in managing service operations.

He is the host of the Customer Confidential Podcast. He serves on the board of directors for AI-based customer support technology company Forethought.
