= Brand engagement =

Process of forming an attachment between a consumer and a brand

Brand engagement is the process of forming an emotional or rational attachment between a consumer and a brand. It comprises one aspect of brand management. Brand engagement impacts brand attachment and positively influence on customer purchase intentions. Brands can form these attachments through different strategies that will promote their brand and overall customer satisfaction.

An example of measuring brand engagement is the service-profit chain, a statistical model that tracks increases in employee “engagement drivers” to correlated increases in customer satisfaction and loyalty, and then correlates this to increases in total shareholder return (TSR), revenue and other financial performance measures.

The social media phenomenon presents emerging evidence that this quest for connectivity is rapidly becoming a core focus of communication technology within organizations. This potentially creates a disconnect with more traditional content-driven models of internal communication—delivering (or making easily available) the right content at the right time to the right people using the right media.

Therefore, there could be a great deal of potential within organisations, using their existing technologies, to derive cultural and performance benefits from re-thinking how they communicate, make decisions and work virtually.

Social Media has played a major part in how people communicate and consume content across the world. Brands can use these social media platforms as ways to directly engage with their consumers. These platforms allow for these brands to be innovative and creative in the promotion of their brand by using the many different creative functions that social media has.

== See also ==
- Loyalty business model
- Brand Intimacy

== Sources ==
- Understanding the psychology of online behaviour: From content to community, a presentation by Dr. Adam Joinson Institute of Educational Technology, The Open University, 2002.
- Self-disclosure in computer-mediated communication: The role of self-awareness and visual anonymity Adam N. Joinson Institute of Educational Technology, The Open University
- In the European Union, Employee Consultation is a legal requirement.
- See Owen, Harrison. Open Space Technology: A User’s Guide. Berrett-Koelher Publishers, San Francisco, 1997 and Bunker, Barbara and Alban, Billie, Large Group Interventions, John Wiley & Sons, San Francisco, 1997.
- M Lynne Markus, Brook Manville and Carole E Agrees What makes a virtual organization work? Sloan Management Review, Cambridge, Fall 2000
- Surowiecki, James. The Wisdom of Crowds. Little, Brown; London: 2004.
- An Initial Examination of Observed Verbal Immediacy and Participants’ Opinions of Communication Effectiveness in Online Group Interaction, Paul L. Witt Texas Christian University.
- Joinson, A.N. (in press) Internet Behaviour and the design of virtual methods. In C. Hine (Ed.). Virtual Methods: issues in social research on the Internet. Oxford: Berg.
- Kiesler, S., Siegal, J. and McGuire, T. W. (1984). Social psychological aspects of computer mediated communication. American Psychologist, 39, 1123-1134.
- Dessart L., Veloutsou C. & Morgan-Thomas A., 2016, “Capturing consumer engagement: duality, dimensionality and measurement”, Journal of Marketing Management, Vol. 32, No. 5/6, pp. 399–426.
- Dessart L., Veloutsou C. & Morgan-Thomas A., 2015, “Consumer engagement in online brand communities: a social media perspective”, Journal of Product and Brand Management, Vol. 24, No. 1, pp. 28–42.
- Schau, H. J., Muñiz, A. M., & Arnould, E. J. (2009). How Brand Community Practices Create Value. Journal of Marketing, 73(5), 30–51. JSTOR 20619045
- Aral, Sinan; Dellarocas, Chrysanthos; Godes, David (2013). "Introduction to the Special Issue: Social Media and Business Transformation: A Framework for Research". Information Systems Research. 24 (1): 3–13. ISSN 1047-7047.
