= Advocacy Index =

Customer survey technique

The Advocacy Index is a customer survey technique developed by VIRTUATel Ltd that is conducted over the telephone. The technique measures customer loyalty using a 3-point scale and is based on the Net Promoter Score (NPS) methodology developed by Fred Reichheld.

== Overview ==
The 3 point survey scale was developed as the traditional NPS survey scale of 0 to 10 was not always appropriate to be used during a telephone survey, as it is more difficult to understand aurally. In addition, telephones do not have a 10 on the keypad, so IVR systems would need to wait for a possible second digit, if the number 1 is pressed, causing delays in telephone based customer surveys.

As they had experience in the area of automated customer surveys, VIRTUATel incorporated the Net Promoter survey technique for driving up-sell, cross-sell and customer retention rates but simplified the 0 to 10 score to use a simple 3 option scale to determine if the survey recipient was an Advocate, Neutral or a Non-Advocate.

The Advocacy Index uses the survey question "would you recommend us..." to create a score showing Advocacy Index.

The value of the "Advocacy" question in customer a survey is confirmed in research by Dr Paul Marsden of LSE in "Advocacy Drives Growth" published in 2005. This in turn, builds on extensive research in the US by Frederick F Reichheld, consultant to Bain & Co., who created the Net Promoter Score (NPS) methodology.

The research found that both word of mouth advocacy (as measured by net-promoter score) and negative word of mouth were statistically significant predictors of annual 2003-2004 sales growth:

- Companies enjoying higher levels of word of mouth advocacy (higher net-promoter scores), such as HSBC, Asda, Honda and O2, grew faster than their competitors in the period 2003–04.
- Companies suffering from low levels of word of mouth advocacy and high levels of negative word of mouth, grew slower than their competitors.
- A 7% increase in word of mouth advocacy unlocks 1% additional company growth.
- A 2% reduction in negative word of mouth boosts sales growth by 1%.
- In monetary terms, for the average company in the analysis, a 1% increase in word of mouth advocacy equated to £8.82m extra sales.
- A 1% reduction in negative word of mouth for the average company in the study resulted in £124.84m in additional sales.
- Companies with above average positive word of mouth and below average negative word of mouth grow four times as fast as those with below average positive word of mouth and above average negative word of mouth.

The report concludes by suggesting that asking a simple question; "Would you recommend this company?" the answer provides a measure of word of mouth advocacy that may be useful not only in predicting sales growth, but also in predicting share performance and employee productivity.
