= Loyalty business model =

Business model in which acquiring customer loyalty is of penultimate importance

The loyalty business model is a business model used in strategic management in which a company's resources are employed so as to increase the loyalty of customers and other stakeholders in the expectation that corporate objectives will be met or surpassed. A typical example of this type of model is where quality of product or service leads to customer satisfaction, which leads to customer loyalty, which leads to profitability.

== The service quality model ==
A model by Kaj Storbacka, Tore Strandvik, and Christian Grönroos (1994), the service quality model, is more detailed than the basic loyalty business model but arrives at the same conclusion. In it, customer satisfaction is first based on a recent experience of the product or service. This assessment depends on prior expectations of overall quality compared to the actual performance received. If the recent experience exceeds prior expectations, customer satisfaction is likely to be high. Customer satisfaction can also be high even with mediocre performance quality if the customer's expectations are low, or if the performance provides value (that is, it is priced low to reflect the mediocre quality). Likewise, a customer can be dissatisfied with the service encounter and still perceive the overall quality to be good. This occurs when a quality service is priced very high and the transaction provides little value.

This loyalty business model then looks at the strength of the business relationship; it proposes that this strength is determined by the level of satisfaction with recent experience, overall perceptions of quality, customer commitment to the relationship, and bonds between the parties. Customers are said to have a "zone of tolerance" corresponding to a range of service quality between "barely adequate" and "exceptional". A single disappointing experience may not significantly reduce the strength of the business relationship if the customer's overall perception of quality remains high, if switching costs are high, if there are few satisfactory alternatives, if they are committed to the relationship, and if there are bonds keeping them in the relationship. The existence of these bonds acts as an exit barrier. There are several types of bonds, including: legal bonds (contracts), technological bonds (shared technology), economic bonds (dependence), knowledge bonds, social bonds, cultural or ethnic bonds, ideological bonds, psychological bonds, geographical bonds, time bonds, and planning bonds.

This model then examines the link between relationship strength and customer loyalty. Customer loyalty is determined by three factors: relationship strength, perceived alternatives and critical episodes. The relationship can terminate if:

1. the customer moves away from the company's service area,
2. the customer no longer has a need for the company's products or services,
3. more suitable alternative providers become available,
4. the relationship strength has weakened,
5. the company handles a critical episode poorly,
6. unexplainable change of price of the service provided.

The final link in the model is the effect of customer loyalty on profitability. The fundamental assumption of all the loyalty models is that keeping existing customers is less expensive than acquiring new ones. It is claimed by Reichheld and Sasser (1990) that a 5% improvement in customer retention can cause an increase in profitability between 25% and 85% (in terms of net present value) depending upon the industry. However, Carrol and Reichheld (1992) dispute these calculations, claiming that they result from faulty cross-sectional analysis.

According to Buchanan and Gilles (1990), the increased profitability associated with customer retention efforts occurs because:

- The cost of acquisition occurs only at the beginning of a relationship: the longer the relationship, the lower the amortized cost.
- Account maintenance costs decline as a percentage of total costs (or as a percentage of revenue).
- Long term customers tend to be less inclined to switch and also tend to be less price sensitive. This can result in stable unit sales volume and increases in sales volume.
- Long term customers may initiate free word of mouth promotions and referrals.
- Long term customers are more likely to purchase ancillary products and high-margin supplemental products.
- Long term customers tend to be satisfied with their relationship with the company and are less likely to switch to competitors, making market entry or competitors' market share gains difficult.
- Regular customers tend to be less expensive to service because they are familiar with the processes involved, require less "education," and are consistent in their order placement.
- Increased customer retention and loyalty makes the employees' jobs easier and more satisfying. In turn, happy employees feed back into higher customer satisfaction in a virtuous circle.

For this final link to hold, the relationship must be profitable. Striving to maintain the loyalty of unprofitable customers is not a viable business model. That is why it is important for marketers to assess the profitability of each of its clients (or types of clients), and terminate those relationships that are not profitable. In order to do this, each customer's "relationship costs" are compared to their "relationship revenue". A useful calculation for this is the patronage concentration ratio. This calculation is hindered by the difficulty in allocating costs to individual relationships and the ambiguity regarding relationship cost drivers.

== Expanded models ==
Virtuous Circle

Schlesinger and Heskett (1991) added employee loyalty to the basic customer loyalty model. They developed the concepts of "cycle of success" and "cycle of failure". In the cycle of success, an investment in your employees’ ability to provide superior service to customers can be seen as a "virtuous circle". Effort spent in selecting and training employees and creating a corporate culture in which they are empowered can lead to increased employee satisfaction and employee competence. This will likely result in superior service delivery and customer satisfaction. This in turn can create customer loyalty, improved sales levels, and higher profit margins. Some of these profits can be reinvested in employee development thereby initiating another iteration of a virtuous cycle.

Fred Reichheld (1996) expanded the loyalty business model beyond customers and employees. He looked at the benefits of obtaining the loyalty of suppliers, employees, bankers, customers, distributors, shareholders, and the board of directors.

Duff and Einig (2015) expanded the model to debt issuers and credit ratings agencies to investigate what role commitment plays in issuer-CRA relations.

== Satisfaction-profit-chain (SPC) model ==
The satisfaction-profit chain is a model that theoretically develops linkages and then enables researchers to test them statistically for a firm using customer data (both from surveys and other sources). The satisfaction-profit-chain was tested in the context of banking industry showing that product and services improvements indeed were associated with customer perceptions, which led to beneficial customer behaviors such as repurchase, and desirable financial outcomes such as increased sales and profitability The satisfaction-profit-chain, as a methodology for managing customer loyalty and firm profitability, is also applicable in business-to-business markets, irrespective of whether the B2B firm sells goods and/or services.

The satisfaction-profit-chain refers to a chain of effects whereby increased performance on key attributes leads to improvements in overall satisfaction, which in turn affects loyalty intentions and behaviors. The increased customer loyalty is shown to affect short- and long-term financial outcomes including sales, profitability, and stock price. More recently, some studies show that especially in the context of services such as retailing and financial services, employee satisfaction can play a critical role in enhancing customer loyalty. This happens because both customer satisfaction and employee satisfaction can mutually reinforce each other, and promote stronger customer loyalty. More specifically, for a given level of overall satisfaction, customer loyalty is disproportionately stronger when customers perceive that employees are also satisfied.

The SPC model has become the basis of a large body of empirical research showing the strong impact of customer satisfaction on customer loyalty. Research has clearly shown that one of the best ways to increase customer loyalty—measured as repurchase intentions and/or repurchase behavior—is by increasing customer satisfaction (more satisfied customers are more loyal, in general). Though the relationship is positive, research shows there are many differences:

1) The effect of customer satisfaction on customer loyalty can vary based on customer demographics and segments, such that it is stronger for some demographic groups and segments than others.

2) The effect of customer satisfaction and customer loyalty, and subsequent financial outcomes for firms, can vary based on industry. Specifically, factors such as—goods versus services industry, degree of competition or concentration in the industry, the utilitarian or hedonic nature of products, and customers' switching costs can affect the nature (non-linearity) and strength of the link between customer satisfaction and customer loyalty.

3) The measurement of loyalty—especially for customers is multi-faceted. Customer loyalty includes a variety of outcomes—intentions and behaviors associated with repurchase including word-of-mouth, complaint behaviors, share-of-wallet or the relative proportion of purchasing from a single firm relative to customer's total purchasing, and likelihood to recommend.

4) Customer loyalty is influenced, not only by customer satisfaction but also employee satisfaction. Customer loyalty is a function of customer satisfaction. In many firms, especially service-oriented industries such as retailing, health-care, financial services, education, and hospitality the level of satisfaction experienced by front-line employees is a critical component. The level of employee satisfaction influences customer satisfaction as shown in a large-scale study of managers, front-line employees, and customers of a DIY retailer in Europe: results showed that managers affected overall job-satisfaction of front-line employees, which in turn affected the satisfaction of customers they interacted with. Most surprisingly, the level of customer loyalty was much higher among those customers who were themselves more satisfied, but also interacted with more satisfied employees. Highly satisfied customers who dealt with relatively less satisfied employees were relatively less loyal.

== Commitment-loyalty model ==
The customer commitment approach to loyalty is based on the idea that customers with higher commitment toward the brand are also more likely to be loyal toward the brand. Earlier models of customer commitment conceptualized it as a unidimensional construct (e.g., Garbarino and Johnson 1999; Moorman et al. 1992). More recently, scholars have developed a five dimensional scale to measure customer commitment and relate it to customer loyalty. The five commitment dimensions include:

- Affective commitment
- Normative commitment
- Economic commitment
- Forced commitment
- Habitual commitment

== Data collection ==
Typically, loyalty data is being collected by multi-item measurement scales administered in questionnaires by software providers such as Confirmit, Medallia, and Satmetrix. However, other approaches sometimes seem more viable if managers want to know the extent of loyalty for an entire data warehouse. This approach is described in Buckinx, Verstraeten & Van den Poel (2006).

All historical trends for different segmentations and their standard of living may also be very helpful in developing customer retention strategy. Lifestyle is also a tool, which can be used for customer retention and to identify needs.

== See also ==
- Brand loyalty – Marketing term for a consumer's emotional attachment to a given brand
- Loyalty marketing – Marketing strategy
- Business model – Description of how businesses operate
- Strategic management – Initiatives to enhance the performance of firms in external environments
- Brand engagement – Process of forming an attachment between a consumer and a brand
- Relationship marketing – Form of marketing focused on customer retention
- Net Promoter Score – Market research metric
- American Customer Satisfaction Index – Economic indicator of consumer satisfaction in the US
- Service–profit chain – Concept which links employee satisfaction to customer loyalty and profitability
- Customer loyalty programs
