= EMO Index =

EMO Index is a tool which aims to measure the feelings of a customer, a group of customers or stakeholders towards a company, product or service. It serves as an alternative to traditional customer satisfaction research.

== Overview ==
EMO Index is an indicator which measures the emotional state of customers and stakeholders and is a registered trademark of EMO Insights International. In 2012 the Company introduced the indicator in the study Emotional Management in the Spanish Retail Banking Market (Estudio de Gestión Emocional en el Mercado Bancario de Particulares en España). The study was conducted based on 1,968 interviews with retail banking customers, both male and female, aged 18 and over, residing in Spain. The study used neuroscience techniques to analyse the customers' past and current experiences with the banks and the emotions these experiences generated in order to calculate their impact on the customers' behaviour.

== How It Works ==
EMO Index is an individual or aggregate indicator which determines the general feelings of each customer, group of customers or stakeholder towards a company, product or service. It is a combination of the Net Emotional State (balance of emotions felt) and the Net Intensity Balance (intensity with which they are felt) and, therefore, can measure values from -100% to +100%.

Since it is calculated at an individual level, it can also classify customers into seven broad, general emotional states which its creators call EMO Clusters:

- Fans (+100 to +80)
- Believers (+80 to +55)
- Followers (+55 to +30)
- Stand By (+30 to +15)
- Lost Souls (+15 to -5)
- Burned Out (-5 to -30)
- Opponents (-100 to -30)

This emotional segmentation model challenges the traditional models used for predicting behaviour based on sociodemographic variables (sex, age, social class, etc.) or classification parameters linked to a specific sector (product purchased, volume of purchases, reasons for purchase, etc.)

Its creators argue that the EMO Index is a more reliable indicator than the likelihood to recommend used by other tools such as the Net Promoter Score. Their argument is supported by a second wave of the study on emotions in banking conducted one year later on 500 subjects who had participated in the previous study. The purpose of the second wave was to determine whether they had recommended the bank to their acquaintances and the following results were obtained:

The classification proposed by Reicheld in his Net Promoter Score (Promoters, Passives and Detractors) is not entirely consistent with regard to what the customers feel or what they say they will do, at least in the Spanish retail banking sector. In particular, it is worth noting that the term "Detractors" includes 62.6% of the customers and, therefore, it does not differentiate between the majority. Moreover, it does not seem to correspond to the emotional state and the stated behaviour of these customers or, at least not all of them. Is the Net Promoter Score (NPS) enough?

== See also ==
- Net Promoter
- The Loyalty Effect
- Relationship marketing
