= Steven Heighton =

Canadian writer (1961–2022)

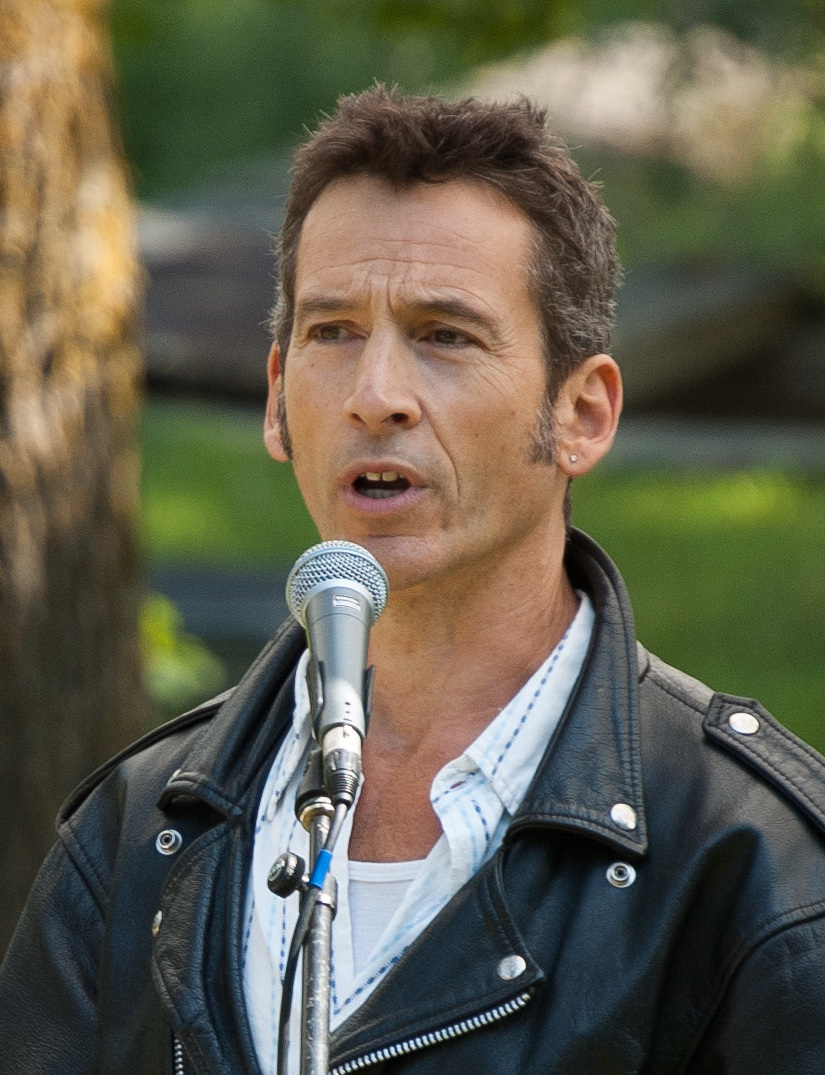
- Heighton at the Eden Mills Writers' Festival in 2017
- Born: August 14, 1961; Toronto, Ontario, Canada
- Died: April 19, 2022 (aged 60); Kingston, Ontario, Canada
- Occupations: novelist, short story writer, poet, non-fiction
- Writing career
- Period: 1980s-2022
- Website: www.stevenheighton.com

Steven Heighton (August 14, 1961 – April 19, 2022) was a Canadian fiction writer, poet, and singer-songwriter. He is the author of eighteen books, including three short story collections, four novels, and seven poetry collections. His last work was Selected Poems 1983-2020 (House of Anansi Press) and an album, The Devil's Share.

== Life and work ==
Heighton was born in Toronto, Ontario, and grew up there and in Red Lake, in northern Ontario. He travelled and worked in western Canada and Australia after high school, got a BA and MA from Queen's University in Kingston, Ontario, and then travelled and worked for two years in Asia before settling back in Kingston and starting to write, at first part-time and eventually full-time.

Heighton's most recent books are the novel The Nightingale Won't Let You Sleep (2017), the Governor General's Award-winning poetry collection The Waking Comes Late (2016), and the Trillium Award finalist The Dead Are More Visible (May 2012). Heighton is also the author of the novel Afterlands (2006), which appeared in six countries and was cited on best of year lists in ten publications in Canada, the US, and Britain. The book is in pre-production for film. Heighton's debut novel, The Shadow Boxer (2001), a story about a young poet-boxer and his struggles growing up, also appeared in five countries.

His work has been translated into ten languages and widely anthologised. He won the Governor General's Award for Poetry in 2016. His books have been nominated for the Governor General's Award, the Trillium Award (twice), the Journey Prize, a Pushcart Prize, and Britain's W.H. Smith Award (best book of the year). He received the Gerald Lampert Award, four gold and one silver award for fiction and for poetry in the National Magazine Awards, the Air Canada Award, the P.K. Page Award, the K.M. Hunter Award, and the Petra Kenney Prize. Flight Paths of the Emperor has been listed at Amazon.ca as one of the ten best Canadian short story collections and has been published in Britain by Granta Books.

Heighton has been the writer-in-residence at McGill University, Queen's, Concordia, the University of Ottawa, and Massey College at the University of Toronto. He has also led writing workshops at the Summer Literary Seminars in Saint Petersburg, Russia (2007), the May Studios at the Banff Centre for the Arts (2001), Writing with Style at the Banff Centre, and the Sage Hill Writing Experience in Blackstrap Lake, Saskatchewan (2015 and 2016.)

His nonfiction book Reaching Mithymna: Among the Volunteers and Refugees on Lesvos was shortlisted for the 2020 Hilary Weston Writers' Trust Prize for Nonfiction.

In April 2021, Heighton released an album of eleven original songs with Wolfe Island Records/CRS Europe. The Devil's Share emerges from "an alchemical bath of blues, rock, folk, country, soul, and Americana." It was recorded at the Post Office Studio, Wolfe Island, Ontario, and produced by Hugh Christopher Brown.

Heighton died on April 19, 2022, at the age of 60 of cancer. He lived in Kingston, Ontario.

== Bibliography ==
=== Novels ===
- The Shadow Boxer (2000) Knopf Canada
- Afterlands (2005) Knopf Canada
- Every Lost Country (2010) Knopf Canada
- The Nightingale Won't Let You Sleep (2017)

=== Short stories ===
- Flight Paths of the Emperor (1992) The Porcupine's Quill
- On earth as it is (1995) The Porcupine's Quill
- The Dead Are More Visible (2012) Knopf Canada
- Instructions for the Drowning (2023) Biblioasis
- Sacred Rage: Selected Stories (2025) Biblioasis

=== Poetry ===
- Foreign Ghosts (1989) Oberon Press
- Stalin’s Carnival (1989) Quarry Press
- The Ecstasy of Skeptics (1994) House of Anansi Press
- The Address Book (2004) House of Anansi Press
- Patient Frame (2010) House of Anansi Press
- The Waking Comes Late (2016) House of Anansi Press
- Selected Poems: 1983-2020 (2021) House of Anansi Press

=== Nonfiction ===
- Reaching Mithymna (2020) Biblioasis

=== Essays ===
- The Admen Move on Lhasa: Writing & Culture in a Virtual World (1997) House of Anansi Press
- Workbook (2011) ECW Press
- The Virtues of Disillusionment (2020) Athabasca University Press

=== Music ===
- The Devil's Share (2021)

=== Anthologies and magazines ===
- Best American Mystery Stories (James Patterson, ed., Norton, 2015)
- 70 Canadian Poets (Gary Geddes, ed., Oxford, 2015)
- Best American Poetry (Mark Doty, ed., Scribner, 2012)
- Finding the Words (Jared Bland, ed., 2011)
- The Best Canadian Poetry (Molly Peacock, series ed., Tightrope Books, 2009, 2010, 2011)
- Best Canadian Stories (Oberon, 1989, ’92, ’95, ’04, ’07)
- The New Story Writers (John Metcalf, ed., Quarry Press, 1991)
- Best English Short Stories (David Hughes & Giles Gordon, eds., Heinemann, U.K., 1992)
- The Minerva Book of Short Stories 5 (Hughes & Gordon, eds., Minerva, U.K., 1993)
- Best of Best English Short Stories 1986-1995 (Hughes & Gordon, eds., Minerva, 1996)
- The Journey Prize Anthology 4 (M&S, 1992)
- The Literature of Work (University of Phoenix Press, 1993)
- The Second Gates of Paradise (Alberto Manguel, ed., MW&R, 1995)
- Canadian Short Fiction, second edition (W.H. New, ed., Prentice Hall, 1996)
- Writing Home (Constance Rooke, ed., M&S, 1997)
- Turn of the Story (Joan Thomas & Heidi Harms, eds., Anansi, 1999)
- Lost Classics (Ondaatje, Redhill, Spalding, and Spalding, eds. Knopf, 2000)
- The Reader (Carolyn Meyer & Bruce Meyer, eds., Prentice Hall, 2001)
- The Notebooks (Michelle Berry & Natalee Caple, eds. Doubleday, 2002)
- Viewpoints 12 (Prentice Hall, 2002)
- The New Canon (ed. Carmine Starnino, Véhicule, 2005)
- Literature (ed. Laurie G. Kirszner, Stephen R. Mandell, and Candace Fertile: Thomson/Nelson 2007)
- The Exile Book of Canadian Sports Stories (ed. Priscila Uppal, Exile Editions, 2009)

== Prizes and honours ==
- 1990 Gerald Lampert Award for best first poetry collection (for Stalin’s Carnival)
- 1991 Prism International Short Story Competition, first prize for "Five Paintings of the New Japan"
- 1992 Finalist, The Journey Prize
- 1992 National Magazine Awards gold medal for fiction
- 1993 Finalist, Trillium Award (for Flight Paths of the Emperor)
- 1995 Finalist, Governor General's Award for Poetry (for The Ecstasy of Skeptics)
- 2002 Petra Kenney Prize for Poetry
- 2004 National Magazine Awards gold medal for poetry
- 2008 National Magazine Awards gold medal for fiction
- 2010 National Magazine Awards gold medal for fiction
- 2010 K.M. Hunter Award for literature
- 2011 National Magazine Awards silver for poetry
- 2011 P.K. Page Founder's Award
- 2013 Finalist, Trillium Award (for The Dead Are More Visible)
- 2016 Governor General's Award for Poetry (for The Waking Comes Late)
- 2019 Finalist, The Moth International Poetry Prize
