= Social media marketing =

Promotion of products or services on social media

A video advert for a fashion magazine

Social media marketing is the use of social media platforms and websites to promote a product or service. Although the terms e-marketing and digital marketing are still dominant in academia, social media marketing is becoming more popular for practitioners and researchers.

Social media platforms such as Facebook, LinkedIn, Instagram, and X, among others, have built-in data analytics tools that companies can use to track the progress, success, and engagement of social media marketing campaigns. Companies address a range of stakeholders through social media marketing, including current and potential customers, current and potential employees, journalists, bloggers, and the general public.

On a strategic level, social media marketing includes the management of a marketing campaign, governance, setting the scope (e.g. more active or passive use) and the establishment of a firm's desired social media "culture" and "tone".

Firms that use social media marketing can allow customers and Internet users to post user-generated content (e.g., online comments, product reviews, etc.), also known as "earned media", rather than use marketer-prepared advertising copy.

== Purposes and tactics ==
Social media may be employed in marketing as a communications tool that makes companies accessible to those who are interested in their product and visible to those who are not familiar with their products. It is used by companies to create buzz, learn from customers, and target them.

Of the top 10 factors that correlate with a strong Google organic search, seven are social media-dependent. This means that if brands with little to no social media presence tend to show up less on Google searches. While platforms such as Twitter, Facebook and—in the past—Google+ have a larger number of monthly users, the visual media-sharing-based mobile platforms garner a higher interaction rate in comparison, and in 2013 registered the fastest growth, changing the ways in which consumers engage with brand content. In 2013, Instagram had an interaction rate of 1.46% with an average of 130 million users monthly as opposed to Twitter, which had a .03% interaction rate with an average of 210 million monthly users. Unlike traditional media that are often cost-prohibitive to many companies, a social media strategy does not require significant financial investment.

To this end, companies make use of platforms such as Facebook, X (formerly Twitter), Pinterest, Instagram to reach audiences much wider than through traditional print, television, or radio advertisements alone at a fraction of the cost, as most social networking sites can be used at little or no cost (however, some websites charge companies for premium services). This has changed the ways that companies approach and interact with customers, as a substantial percentage of consumer interactions are now being carried out over online platforms with much higher visibility. Customers can post reviews of products and services, rate customer service, and ask questions or voice concerns directly to companies through social media platforms.

According to Measuring Success, over 80% of consumers use the web to research products and services. Thus social media marketing is also used by businesses in order to build relationships of trust with consumers. To this aim, companies may hire personnel to specifically handle these social media interactions, who usually report under the title of online community managers. Handling these interactions in a satisfactory manner can result in an increase of consumer trust. To both this aim and to fix the public's perception of a company, three steps are taken in order to address consumer concerns:

- Identifying the extent of the social chatter
- Engaging the influencers to help
- Developing a proportional response

== Strategies ==
=== Passive approach ===
Social media can be a useful source of market information and a way to hear customers' perspectives. Blogs, content communities, and forums are platforms where individuals share their reviews and recommendations of brands, products, and services. Businesses are able to tap into and analyze customer voices and feedback generated in social media for marketing purposes. In this sense, social media is a relatively inexpensive source of market intelligence which can be used by marketers and managers to track and respond to consumer-identified problems and detect market opportunities.

=== Active approach ===
Social media can be used as a public relations tool, a direct marketing tool, and a communication channel to target very specific audiences, with social media influencers and social media personalities as effective customer engagement tools. This tactic is widely known as influencer marketing, which gives brands the opportunity to reach their target audience via a group of selected influencers advertising their product or service. Brands were projected to spend up to $15 billion on influencer marketing by 2022, per Business Insider Intelligence estimates, based on Mediakix data. The use of customer influencers, such as popular bloggers, can be an efficient and cost-effective method to launch new products or services.

==== Trend simulation ====
Trend simulation is a digital marketing approach to manufacturing interest, typically through social media marketing through the deployment of burner pages, fake accounts, and volume posting. The technique 's artificial seeding to steer discourse and induce viral marketing has been criticized as an unethical psyop.

== Engagement ==
Engagement with the social web means that customers and stakeholders are active participants rather than passive spectators. An example of these are consumer advocacy groups and groups that criticize companies (e.g., lobby groups or advocacy organizations). The use of social media in a business or political context allows people to express and share opinions about a company's products, services or business practices, or a government's actions.

On social media, each participant becomes part of the marketing department (or a challenge to the marketing effort) as other customers read their comments or reviews. The effectiveness of social media marketing campaigns is dependent on the promotion of online engagement. With the advent of social media marketing, it has become increasingly important to gain customer interest in products and services, which can eventually be translated into buying behavior, or voting and donating behavior in a political context. New online marketing concepts of engagement and loyalty have emerged which aim to build customer participation and brand reputation.

Engagement in social media for the purpose of a social media strategy is divided into two parts. The first is proactive, regular posting of new online content, which can be seen through digital photos, digital videos, text, and conversations. It is also represented through sharing of content and information from others via weblinks. The second part is reactive conversations, with social media users responding to those who reach out to others' social media profiles through comments or messages.

== Campaigns ==
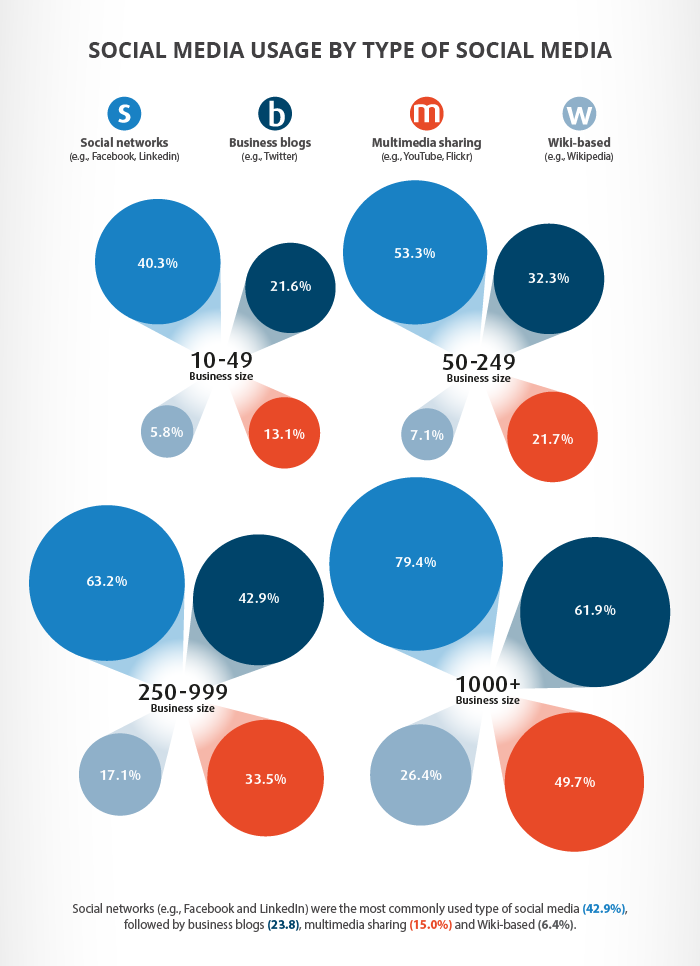
Business use of social media in the UK in 2012

=== Local businesses ===
Small businesses use social networking sites as a promotional technique. Businesses can follow individuals' social media usage in their local area and advertise specials and deals, which can be exclusive and in the form of "get a free drink with a copy of this tweet". This type of message encourages other locals to follow the business on their official websites in order to obtain the promotional deal. The business's brand visibility is enhanced in the process.

Social networking sites are also used by small businesses to develop their own market research on new products and services. By encouraging their customers to give feedback on new product ideas, businesses can gain insights on whether or not a product may be accepted by their target market enough to merit full production. In addition, customers will feel the company has engaged them in the process of co-creation—the process in which the business uses customer feedback to create or modify a product or service to fill a need of the target market. Such feedback can be presented in various forms, such as surveys, contests, and polls.

Social networking sites such as LinkedIn, also provide opportunities for small businesses to find candidates to fill staff positions. Review sites such as Yelp help small businesses build their reputation beyond brand visibility. Positive customer peer reviews help influence new prospects to purchase goods and services more than company advertising.

== Benefits ==
Social media marketing allows companies to promote themselves to large, diverse audiences that could not be reached through traditional marketing such as phone and email-based advertising. Marketing on most social media platforms also comes at little to no cost, making it accessible to virtually any size business. Social media marketing accommodates personalized and direct marketing that targets specific demographics and markets. Companies can engage with customers directly, allowing them to obtain feedback and resolve issues almost immediately.

Social media marketing is an ideal environment for a company to conduct market research. It can be used as a means of obtaining information about competitors and boost competitive advantage. Social platforms can be used to promote brand events, deals, and news. Social platforms can also be used to offer incentives in the form of loyalty points and discounts. It allows companies to build an online platform to promote and sell their product.

Social media marketing can also be useful for gaining customers who would not know about the business otherwise. It builds a community that enhances a business's reach in their selected target market.

=== Advertising campaigns ===
To promote the 2013 film Monsters University, Disney/Pixar created a Tumblr account, MUGrumblr, saying that the account is maintained by a 'Monstropolis transplant' and 'self-diagnosed coffee addict' who is currently a sophomore at Monsters University. A "student" from Monsters University uploaded memes, animated GIFs, and Instagram-like photos related to the movie.

In 2014, Apple created a Tumblr page to promote the iPhone 5c, labeling it "Every color has a story" with the website name "ISee5c". The site's main page is covered with different colors representing the iPhone 5c phone colors and case colors. When a colored section is clicked, a 15-second video plays a song and "showcases the dots featured on the rear of the iPhone 5c official cases and on the iOS 7 dynamic wallpapers", concluding with words that are related to the video's theme.

== Marketing techniques ==
Social media marketing involves the use of social networks, consumer's online brand-related activities (COBRA) and electronic word of mouth to advertise online. Social networks such as Facebook and Twitter provide advertisers with information about the likes and dislikes of their consumers. This technique provides businesses with target audiences.

With social networks, information relevant to users' likes is available to businesses, who then advertise accordingly. Uploading pictures of one's own recently purchased products is an example of a consumer's online brand-related activity. Electronic recommendations and appraisals are a convenient manner to have a product promoted via consumer-to-consumer interactions. An example of electronic word of mouth would be an online hotel review; the hotel company can have two possible outcomes based on their service. A good service would result in a positive review, which gets the hotel free advertising via social media. However, a poor service will result in a negative consumer review, which can potentially harm the company's reputation.

Social networking sites such as Facebook, Instagram, and Twitter have all influenced the buzz of word-of-mouth marketing. In 1999, Misner said that word-of mouth marketing is, "the world's most effective, yet least understood marketing strategy". Through the influence of opinion leaders, the increased online "buzz" of word-of-mouth marketing that products, services or companies experience is due to the rise in use of social media and smartphones. Businesses and marketers have noticed that, "a person's behaviour is influenced by many small groups".

These small groups rotate around social networking accounts that are run by influential people (opinion leaders or "thought leaders") who have followers of groups. The types of groups (followers) are called:

- Reference groups (people who either know each other face-to-face or indirectly influence other people's attitudes or behaviours)
- Membership groups (people who directly influence other people's attitudes or behaviours)
- Aspirational groups (groups which an individual wishes to belong to)

=== Blogs ===
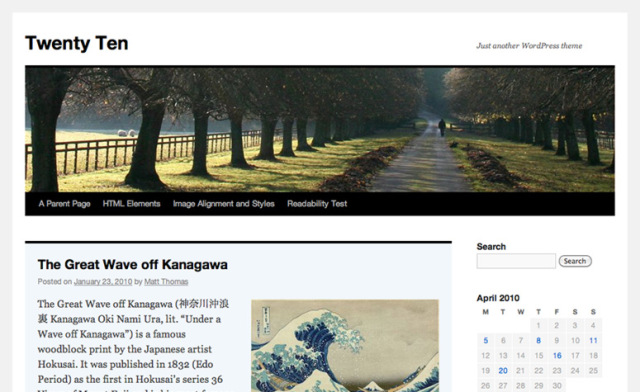
A Wordpress blog

Platforms like LinkedIn create an environment for companies and clients to connect online. Companies that recognize the need for information, originality and accessibility employ blogs to make their products popular and unique/ and ultimately reach out to consumers who are privy to social media.

Studies from 2009 show that consumers view coverage in the media or from bloggers as being more neutral and credible than print advertisements, which are not thought of as free or independent. Blogs allow a product or company to provide longer descriptions of products or services, may include testimonials and links to related social media or blog content.

Blogs can be updated frequently and are promotional techniques for keeping customers, and also for acquiring followers and subscribers who can then be directed to social network pages. Online communities can enable a business to reach the clients of other businesses using the platform. To allow firms to measure their standing in the corporate world, sites enable employees to place evaluations of their companies.

Some businesses opt out of integrating social media platforms into their traditional marketing regimen. There are also specific corporate standards that apply when interacting online. To maintain an advantage in a business-consumer relationship, businesses have to be aware of four key assets that consumers maintain: information, involvement, community, and control.

=== Influencer marketing ===
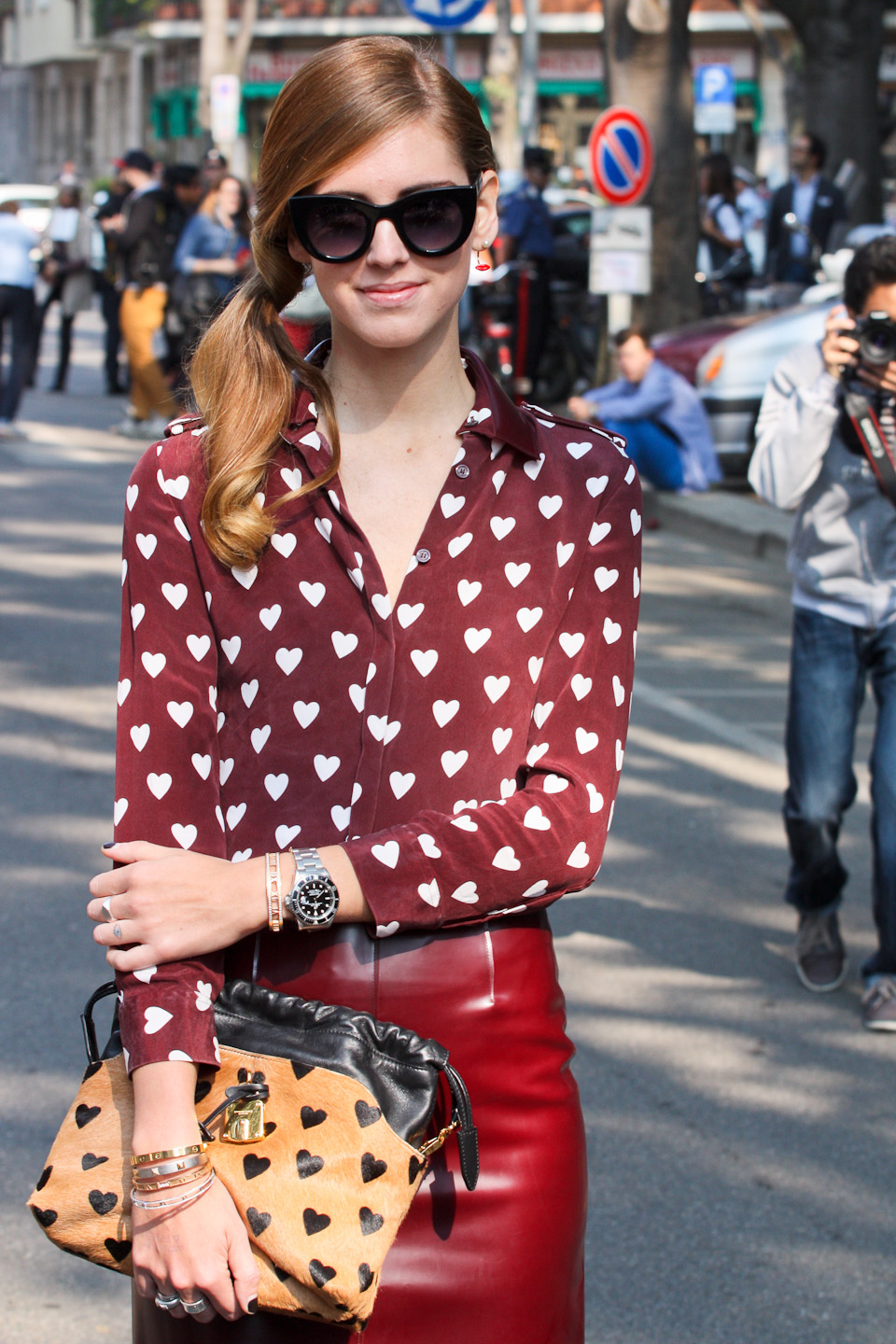
Chiara Ferragni is a fashion influencer and blogger known for her sponsored fashion posts.

Marketers target influencers on social media that are recognized as being opinion leaders and opinion-formers based on the credibility of their following. An influencer's role under a brand sponsorship is to send messages to their target audiences through posts to amplify the credibility of a product or brand. A social media post by an opinion leader can have a much greater impact (via the forwarding or "liking" of the post) than a social media post by a regular user.

Influencers can help brands obtain more consumers by promoting their products in an honest and genuine way using personal sales methods, which is why brands consider collaborations with influencers to be a smart strategy. However, influencer marketing works well because it uses real, shareable, and viral content to reach a large audience and provide a profitable return on investment.

Marketers have realized that "consumers are more prone to believe in other individuals" who they trust. Opinion leaders can also send their own messages about the products and services that they choose. They have strong following bases because their opinions are valued or trusted. Because of their personality, beliefs, values, and other characteristics, they have the potential to influence other people. They usually have a large number of followers otherwise known as their reference, membership or aspirational group.

An opinion leader's support of a product (by posting a photo, video or written recommendation on a blog) can influence their followers and increase the chance of the brand selling more products or creating a following base of its own. The adjusted communication model shows the use of using opinion leaders and opinion formers. The sender/source gives the message to many opinion leaders, who pass the message on along with their personal opinions. The receivers form their own opinions and send their personal messages to their friends and family.

=== Organic social media ===
In contrast with pre-Internet marketing, such as TV ads and newspaper ads, in which marketers controlled all aspects of their ads, social media users are free to post comments right below online ads or post by companies about their products.

Companies are increasing the use of their social media strategies as part of their traditional marketing efforts via magazines, newspapers, radio advertisements, and television advertisements. Since the 2010s, media consumers have often used multiple platforms at the same time (e.g. surfing the Internet on a tablet while watching a streaming TV show), so consistency of marketing content across all platforms has become necessary.

Heath (2006) wrote about the extent of attention that businesses should give to their social media sites. It is about finding a balance between frequently posting, but not over-posting. There is a lot more attention to be paid towards social media sites because people need updates to gain brand recognition. Therefore, a lot more content is needed, and this can often be unplanned content.

Planned content begins with the creative/marketing team generating their ideas. Once they have completed their ideas, they send them off for approval. There are two general ways to do so:

- The first is where each sector approves the plan one after another, editor, brand, followed by the legal team. Sectors may differ depending on the size and philosophy of the business.
- The second is where each sector is given 24 hours (or such designated time) to sign off or disapprove. If no action is given within the 24-hour period, the original plan is implemented.

Planned content is often noticeable to customers and is un-original or lacks excitement, but is also a safer option to avoid unnecessary backlash from the public. Both routes for planned content are time-consuming as in the above; on the first pathway to approval, content takes 72 hours to be approved. Although the second route can be significantly shorter, it also holds more risk, particularly in the legal department.

Unplanned content is an "in the moment" idea, "a spontaneous, tactical reaction". The content could be trending and not have the time to take the planned content route. The unplanned content is posted sporadically and is not calendar/date/time arranged (Deshpande, 2014). Issues with unplanned content revolve around legal issues and whether the message being sent out represents the business/brand accordingly. If a company sends out a Tweet or Facebook message too hurriedly, the company may unintentionally use insensitive language or messaging that could alienate some consumers.

For example, celebrity chef Paula Deen was criticized after she made a social media post commenting about HIV-AIDS and South Africa; her message was deemed offensive by many observers. The main difference between planned and unplanned is the time to approve the content. Unplanned content must still be approved by marketing managers, but in a much more rapid manner e.g. 1–2 hours or less. Sectors may miss errors because of being hurried.

When using unplanned content Brito (2013) says, "be prepared to be reactive and respond to issues when they arise". Brito writes about having a, "crisis escalation plan", because, "It will happen". The plan involves breaking down the issue into topics and classifying the issue into groups. "[I]dentify[ing] and flag[ging] potential risks" also helps to organise an issue. The problem can then be handled by the correct team and dissolved more effectively rather than any person at hand trying to solve the situation.

==== Platforms ====
Individuals, businesses, and other organizations can interact with one another and build relationships and communities online through social networking websites. Consumers can directly interact with companies that join these social channels. These interactions can be more personal to users than traditional methods of outbound marketing and advertising. The ability to rapidly change buying patterns and product or service acquisition and activity to a growing number of consumers is defined as an influence network.

On social networking sites and blogs, users can repost comments made by others about a product being promoted, which occurs quite frequently on some social media sites. Users can extend the reach of messages by sharing them with their connections and bringing more traffic to products/companies through word of mouth. Businesses can interact with users directly and deliver targeted content based on user preferences. As users choose whom to follow on these sites, products can reach a very narrow target audience.

Social networking sites also host information about what products and services prospective clients might be interested in. Marketers can use semantic analysis technologies to detect buying signals, such as content shared by people and questions posted online. An understanding of buying signals can help sales people target relevant prospects and marketers run micro-targeted campaigns.

In 2014, over 80% of business executives identified social media as an integral part of their business. Business retailers have seen 133% increases in their revenues from social media marketing.

==== Facebook ====
Facebook pages are more detailed than Twitter accounts. They allow a product to provide videos, photos, longer descriptions, and testimonials where followers can comment on the product pages for others to see. Facebook can link back to the product's Twitter page, as well as send out event reminders. As of May 2015, 93% of businesses marketers used Facebook to promote their brand.

A study from 2011 attributed 84% of "engagement" or clicks and likes that link back to Facebook advertising. By 2014, Facebook had restricted the content published from business and brands. Adjustments in Facebook algorithms had reduced the audience for non-paying business pages (that have at least 500,000 likes) from 16% in 2012 down to 2% in February 2014.

==== Instagram ====
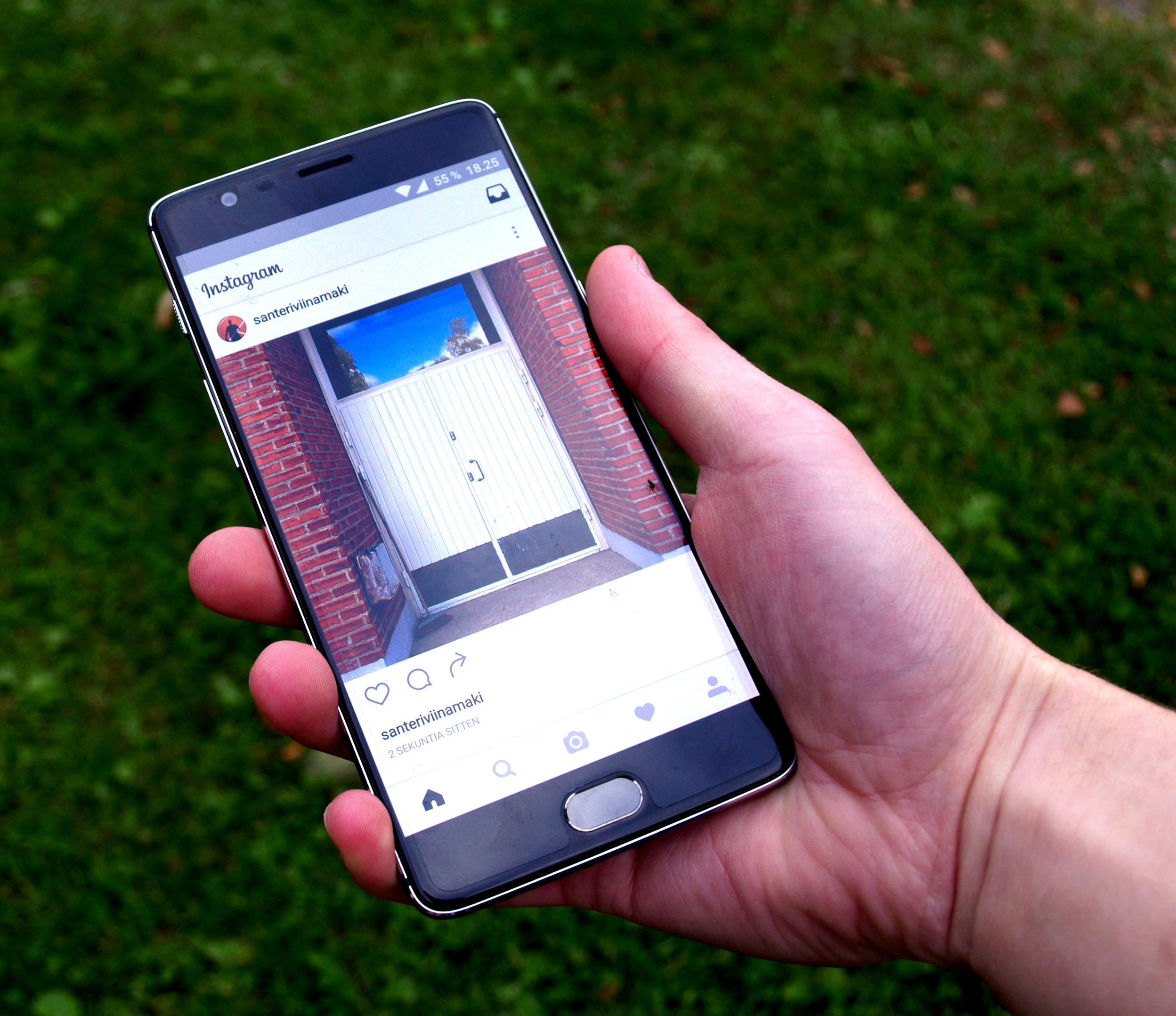
The Instagram app

In May 2014, Instagram had over 200 million users. The user engagement rate of Instagram was 15 times higher than of Facebook and 25 times higher than that of Twitter.

==== LinkedIn ====
Companies can create professional LinkedIn profiles for themselves and their business to network and meet others. LinkedIn members can use "Company Pages" similar to Facebook pages to create an area on which business owners can promote their products or services and interact with their customers.

==== Snapchat ====
Snapchat is an American multimedia instant messaging app. One of the principal features of Snapchat is that pictures and messages are usually available for only a short time before they become inaccessible to their recipients.

==== TikTok ====
TikTok was first released in 2016 and became one of the most popular social media apps with over 1 billion users worldwide. It is mainly mobile-based and allows users to post short video content.

==== Tumblr ====
Blogging website Tumblr first launched ad products on May 29, 2012. Rather than relying on simple banner ads, Tumblr requires advertisers to create a Tumblr blog so the content of those blogs can be featured on the site. In one year, four native ad formats were created on web and mobile, and had more than 100 brands advertising on Tumblr with 500 cumulative sponsored posts.

==== Twitter/X ====
Twitter allows companies to promote their products in short messages known as tweets limited to 280 characters which appear on followers' Home timelines. Twitter has also been used by companies to provide customer service.

==== Yelp ====
Yelp consists of a comprehensive online index of business profiles. Businesses are searchable by location, similar to Yellow Pages. The website is operational in seven different countries, including the United States and Canada. Business account holders can create, share, and edit business profiles, and post information such as their business's location and contact information, along with pictures and service information. Individuals can write, post reviews about businesses, and rate them on a five-point scale. Messaging and talk features are additionally made available for general members of the website, serving to guide thoughts and opinions.

==== YouTube ====
Advertisements on YouTube can use targeted advertising via Google Ads.

Advertisers can also sponsor videos directly, which is a form of native advertising. YouTube also enable publishers to earn money through its YouTube Partner Program. Companies can pay YouTube for a special "channel" which promotes the companies products or services.

=== Social bookmarking sites ===
Social bookmarking sites are used in social media promotion. Each of these sites is dedicated to the collection, curation, and organization of links to other websites that users deem to be of good quality. This process is "crowdsourced", allowing amateur social media network members to sort and prioritize links by relevance and general category. Due to the large user bases of these websites, any link from one of them to another, the smaller website may in a flash crowd, a sudden surge of interest in the target website.

In addition to user-generated promotion, these sites also offer advertisements within individual user communities and categories. Because ads can be placed in designated communities with a very specific target audience and demographic, they have far greater potential for traffic generation than ads selected simply through cookie and browser history.

Additionally, some of these websites have also implemented measures to make ads more relevant to users by allowing users to vote on which ones will be shown on pages they frequent. The ability to redirect large volumes of web traffic and target specific, relevant audiences makes social bookmarking sites a valuable asset for social media marketers.

== Implications on traditional advertising ==
=== Minimizing use ===
Traditional advertising techniques include print and television advertising. The Internet has already overtaken television as the largest advertising market. Web sites often include banner or pop-up ads. Social networking sites do not always carry ads. In exchange, products have entire pages and are able to interact with users. Television commercials often end with a spokesperson asking viewers to check out the product website for more information. While briefly popular, print ads included QR codes which can be scanned by cell phones and computers, sending viewers to the product website. Advertising is beginning to move viewers from traditional outlets to electronic ones.

=== Mishaps ===
Due to the viral nature of the Internet, mishaps with social media posts can be damaging for organizations.

In 2011, designer Kenneth Cole tweeted, "Millions are in uproar in #Cairo. Rumor has they heard our new spring collection is now available online at [Kenneth Cole's website]". This reference to the 2011 Egyptian revolution drew an objection from the public; it was widely objected to on the Internet. Kenneth Cole realized his mistake shortly after and responded with a statement apologizing for the tweet.

In 2011, a Chrysler Group employee tweeted that no one in Detroit knows how to drive.

In 2012, during Hurricane Sandy, Gap sent out a tweet to its followers telling them to stay safe, but encouraged them to shop online and offered free shipping. The tweet was deemed insensitive, and Gap eventually took it down and apologized.

When the Link REIT opened a Facebook page to recommend old-style restaurants, the page was flooded by furious comments criticizing the REIT for having forced a lot of restaurants and stores to shut down; it had to terminate its campaign early amid further deterioration of its corporate image.

In 2018, Max Factor, MAC and other beauty brands were forced to rush to disassociate themselves from Kuwaiti beauty blogger and Instagram 'influencer' Sondos Alqattan after she criticised government moves to improve conditions for domestic workers.

=== Ethics ===
The ethical principles associated with traditional marketing can also be applied to social media. However, with social media being so personal and international, online ethics come with additional complications and challenges. A sensitive topic amongst social media professionals is the subject of ethics in social media marketing practices, specifically the proper uses of, often, very personal data. With social media, marketers can see what consumers like to hear from advertisers, how they engage online, and what their needs and wants are, instead of focusing solely on the basic demographics and psychographics given from television and magazines.

The general concept of ethical social media usage entails honesty with a campaign's intentions, avoiding false advertising, awareness of user privacy conditions (which means not using consumers' private information for gain), respecting people's dignity, and taking responsibility for mistakes or mishaps that result from marketing campaigns. Most social network marketers use websites like Facebook and MySpace to try to drive traffic to another website.

In addition, social media platforms have become extremely aware of their users and collect information about their viewers to connect with them in various ways. Facebook is quietly working on a new advertising system that would let marketers target users with ads based on the massive amounts of information people reveal on the site about themselves.

Some people may react negatively because they believe it is an invasion of privacy. On the other hand, some individuals may enjoy this feature because their social network recognizes their interests and sends them particular advertisements pertaining to those interests. Consumers like to network with people who share their interests and desires. Managers invest in social media to foster relationships and interact with customers.

For many users, data collection is a breach of privacy, but there are no laws that prevent these companies from using the information provided on their websites. Companies like Equifax, TransUnion, and LexisNexis thrive on collecting and sharing the personal information of social media users. In 2012, Facebook purchased information about 70 million households from a third-party company called Datalogix. Facebook later revealed that they purchased the information in order to create a more efficient advertising service.

== See also ==
- Integrated marketing communications
- internet celebrity
- Internet marketing
- Social media analytics
- Social media in the fashion industry
- Social media optimization
- Social media spam
- Social video marketing
- Visual marketing
- Web 2.0
