= Jonah Berger =

American marketer

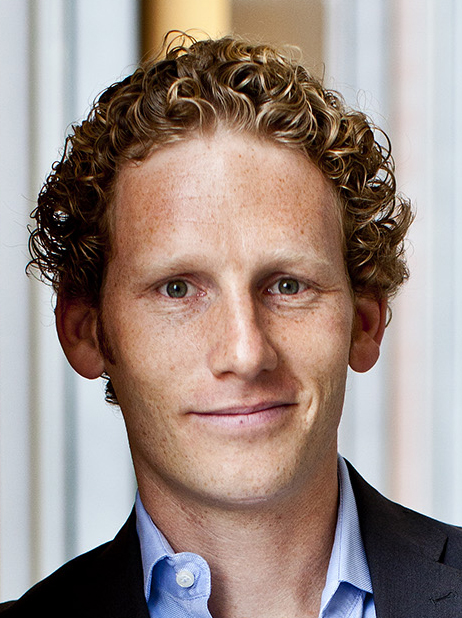
- Born: Jonah Burger c.. 1981 (age 44–45); Washington, D.C., U.S.
- Education: Stanford University (BA, PhD)
- Occupations: Writer; professor
- Known for: Contagious: Why Things Catch On The Catalyst: How To Change Anyone's Mind Invisible Influence: The Hidden Forces that Shape Behavior
- Website: http://jonahberger.com/

Jonah Berger (born c. 1981) is an American professor and author. He serves as a Marketing Professor at the Wharton School of the University of Pennsylvania.

== Biography ==
Born in Washington, D.C., Berger was raised in Chevy Chase, Maryland, and attended the magnet program at Montgomery Blair High School in Silver Spring. He earned a B.A. in Human Judgment and Decision Making from Stanford University in 2002, followed by a PhD in marketing from Stanford's Graduate School of Business in 2007. Berger is known for his research and writings on psychology, marketing, social influence, and virality. He has authored several books, including "Contagious: Why Things Catch On" and "Invisible Influence: The Hidden Forces That Shape Behavior."

== Publications ==
=== Books ===
- Contagious: Why Things Catch On, Simon & Schuster, 2013
  - Amazon Best book of 2013
  - Audible Best Audiobook of 2013
- Invisible Influence: The Hidden Factors that Shape Behavior, Simon & Schuster, 2016
- The Catalyst: How to Change Anyone's Mind (2020)
- Magic Words: What to Say to Get Your Way (2023)

=== Selected articles ===
- Berger, Jonah and Grant Packard (2018), “Are Atypical Things More Popular?”, Psychological Science, 29(7), 1178–1184.
- Packard, Grant and Jonah Berger (2017), "How Language Shapes Word of Mouth’s Impact", Journal of Marketing Research, 54(4), 572–588.
- Akpinar, Ezgi and Jonah Berger (2015), "Drivers of Cultural Evolution: The Case of Sensory Metaphors”, Journal of Personality and Social Psychology, 109 (1), 20–34.
- Berger, Jonah (2014) "Word-of-Mouth and Interpersonal Communication: A Review and Directions for Future Research”, Journal of Consumer Psychology, 24(4), 586–607.
- Berger, Jonah and Katy Milkman (2012), "What Makes Online Content Viral?", Journal of Marketing Research, 49 (2), 192–205.
- Berger, Jonah and Raghuram Iyengar (2013), "Communication Channels and Word of Mouth: How the Medium Shapes the Message”, Journal of Consumer Research, October.
- Zoey Chen and Jonah Berger (2013), "When, Why, and How Controversy Causes Conversation", Journal of Consumer Research, October.
- Berger, Jonah, Eric Bradlow, Alex Braunstein, and Yao Zhang (2012), "From Karen to Katie: Using Baby names to Study Cultural Evolution”, Psychological Science, 23 (10), 1067–1073.
- Sela, Aner and Jonah Berger (2012), "Decision Quicksand: How Trivial Choice Suck Us In”, Journal of Consumer Research, 39(2), 360–370.
- Berger, Jonah and Eric Schwartz (2011), "What Drives Immediate and Ongoing Word of Mouth?", Journal of Marketing Research, October, 869–880.
- Berger, Jonah and Devin Pope (2011), "Can Losing Lead to Winning?", Management Science, 57(5), 817–827.
- Berger, Jonah, Alan T. Sorensen, and Scott J. Rasmussen (2010), “Positive Effects of Negative Publicity: When Negative Reviews Increase Sales,” Marketing Science, 29(5), 815–827.
- Berger, Jonah and Gael Le Mens (2009), "How Adoption Speed Affects the Abandonment of Cultural Tastes", Proceedings of the National Academy of Sciences, 106, 8146–8150.
- Berger, Jonah, Marc Meredith, and S. Christian Wheeler (2008), "Contextual Priming: Where People Vote Affects How They Vote”, Proceedings of the National Academy of Sciences, 105 (26), 8846–8849.
- Berger, Jonah and Gráinne M. Fitzsimons (2008), "Dogs on the Street, Pumas on Your Feet: How Cues in the Environment Influence Product Evaluation and Choice”, Journal of Marketing Research, 45(1), 1–14.
- Berger, Jonah and Chip Heath (2007), "Where Consumers Diverge from Others: Identity-Signaling and Product Domains”, Journal of Consumer Research, 34(2), 121–134.

== Awards ==
- The American Marketing Association (AMA) Top 5 Most Productive Researchers in Marketing
- The Association for Consumer Research (ACR) Early Career Award for Contribution to Consumer Research
- The Society for Consumer Psychology (SCP) Early Career Award for Distinguished Scientific Contributions to Consumer Psychology
- The Wharton School of the University of Pennsylvania Iron Professor Award for Awesome Faculty Research
- The Wharton School of the University of Pennsylvania MBA Teaching Commitment and Curricular Innovation Award, 2011
- New York Times, Year in Ideas
