= The Moth (magazine) =

Poetry magazine est. 2010

The Moth is an international arts and literature magazine, based in Milltown, County Cavan, Ireland. It features poetry, short fiction, art and interviews.

The magazine was established in 2010 by Rebecca O'Connor and Will Govan and ceased publication in the spring of 2023.

Former contributors include Max Porter, Claire-Louise Bennett, Mike McCormack, Joshua Cohen, Suzanne Joinson, Rob Doyle, Thomas Morris, Sara Baume, Lee Rourke, Thomas Maloney, June Caldwell, Owen Booth, Robert McLiam Wilson, Nicholas Hogg, John Boyne, Nuala Ni Conchúir, Hilary Fannin and Stephen May.

A junior version aimed at 7-11 year olds, called The Caterpillar, was published between 2013 and 2023.

Prizes run by The Moth include The Moth Poetry Prize, The Moth Short Story Prize, The Moth Nature Writing Prize and The Caterpillar Poetry Prize.

The Moth Poetry Prize was established in 2011. €6,000 is awarded for a single unpublished poem, with three runner-up prizes of €1,000 and eight prizes of €250 for commended poems. The contest is open to anyone (over 16), as long as the poem is previously unpublished, and each year it attracts thousands of entries from new and established poets from over 50 countries. The prize is judged anonymously by a single poet. Previous judges include Nick Laird, Claudia Rankine, Jacob Polley, Matthew Sweeney, Leontia Flynn, Marie Howe, Michael Symmons Roberts, Billy Collins, Deborah Landau Daljit Nagra and Nobel Laureate Louise Glück.

The Moth Short Story Prize is an international prize, open to anyone from anywhere in the world, as long as the story is original and previously unpublished. The winners are chosen by a single judge each year, who reads the stories anonymously.

Previous judges include Mike McCormack, Belinda McKeon, Donal Ryan, Kit de Waal, Kevin Barry and Mark Haddon. The judge for 2021 is Ali Smith.

The Moth Nature Writing Prize was established in 2020, and the inaugural prize was judged by Richard Mabey. The judge for 2021 is Helen Macdonald.
