= Patronage concentration =

Concept in marketing and retailing

Patronage concentration is a term used in marketing and retailing. It is the share of an individual consumer's expenditures in an industry or retail sector that is spent at one company. It is the amount that a person spends at one company divided by the amount that a person spends at all companies in the industry.

The relation is as follows:

$$\frac{\text{amount spent at one company}}{\text{amount spent at all companies in the industry}}$$.

For example, I may spend $1000 per year at fast food restaurants. If I spend $100 at Wendy's Restaurants, then Wendy's has (100/1000=10%) ten percent of my patronage. As long as the amount spent at one firm is less than the total amount spent at all firms in the industry, the customer will be patronizing more than one firm, and patronage concentration will be less than 100%.

The goal of many firms is to increase the patronage concentration ratio of its customers to 100%. Some firms set different patronage concentration targets for various classes of customers. This reflects the fact that some types of customers are more profitable than others.

This is very similar to market share. Whereas market share describes the percentage of all customers that patronize a company relative to the industry total, the patronage concentration ratio describes the percentage of one customer's patronage going to a company, relative to that person's spending in the industry. That is, market share is the aggregate or macro version of the patronage concentration ratio. Or alternatively, patronage concentration is the micro equivalent of market share.

In retailing, it has been demonstrated that store patronage is a continuum between single store loyalty and the use of several different stores. In particular, patronage concentration involves trading off economic resources against product assortment, and spatial and temporal benefits. It has been shown that patronage decisions are associated with consumer characteristics that are suggestive of heterogeneous cost–benefit tradeoffs and opportunity costs of time.

== See also ==
- Loyalty business model
- Personalized marketing
- Relationship marketing
