= Reply marketing =

Marketing technique

Reply marketing (or direct response marketing), is a form of viral marketing where an advertiser/marketer replies directly to an end-user with an advertisement or a personalized message. It is a means of marketing designed to generate an immediate response from consumers, where each consumer response can be measured, and later attributed to the corresponding advertising channel. Television, radio, social media, search engine marketing, print, phone, internet, and mail serve as the typical channels for this type of advertisement, with e-mail being the most effective form of direct response. It was first introduced in 2010 by Old Spice, with its well-known viral ads featuring actor Isaiah Mustafa. Mustafa, though, replied to numerous potential users simultaneously via an amusing video on YouTube. Recipients were persons who were commenting about various videos via Twitter.

The name of this form of marketing comes from its characteristics of replying to a customer directly instead of to a broader audience. Common concurrences of reply marketing include asking consumers to "call now" or "act fast" in order to create a sense of urgency that will drive potential sales. In addition to e-mail being the most effective in obtaining direct response, online advertising (such as the "You've won $1000. Click here." ads) has become an increasingly common form of reply marketing due to its interactive nature – if the advertisement captures a consumer's attention, it is clicked, thus introducing the product to the customer.

== Advantages ==
Reply marketing is an inexpensive marketing strategy because less total advertising is used (the goal is to create an immediate sale). A second advantage includes the fact that response marketing campaigns produce quantitative consumer information and data, which reflects the effectiveness of that campaign.

== Disadvantages ==
A disadvantage of reply marketing includes the discouragement of long-term, intimate relationships between the consumer, and a company. This is attributed to the immediate nature of the response marketing approach, and the basis of creating a sense of urgency for consumers to take advantage of opportunities.

== Examples ==
- Old Spice: In 2010, the Old Spice marketing department launched an advertising campaign featuring the "Old Spice Man". Five months later, Twitter followers were invited to participate in a real time Q & A session with the Old Spice Man himself. His responses were made into videos, and then posted online. As a result of this reply marketing strategy, the videos were viewed by 7 million people, and the Old Spice brand increased their Twitter followers by more than 1000 percent.
- Esurance: In 2014, auto insurance company, Esurance, launched a social media campaign in the form of a Twitter hashtag sweepstakes that aired as soon as Super Bowl XLVIII ended. Featuring The Office actor, John Krasinski, the commercial promised viewers a $1.5 million prize to a single Twitter user who tweeted the hashtag #EsuranceSave30 between 4 p.m. Eastern Sunday and 4 a.m. Eastern Tuesday. According to Esurance spokesman, Danny Miller, in less than 24 hours, the contest had already received 2 million entries, with 200,000 tweets coming in the minute after the post-Super Bowl commercial aired. To this day, the company's Twitter following had increased from 8,900 to more than 110,000 followers.
- Wells Fargo: In 2012, American multinational banking and financial services holding company, Wells Fargo, launched a television commercial called "Protect Your Money with Account Alerts". At the end of the T.V. spot, a 1-800 number appears on the screen, prompting viewers to urgently call to guarantee bank account safety.

== See also ==
- As seen on TV
- Clickbait
- Conversion marketing
- Direct marketing
