= Social video marketing =

Social video marketing is a component of an integrated marketing communications plan designed to increase audience engagement through social activity around a given video. In a successful social video marketing campaign, the content, distribution strategy and consumer self-expression tools combine to allow an individual to “add their voice” or co-create value to a piece of content - then further disseminate it out to their social acquaintances. Social video typically benefits from a halo effect cast by the "influencers” of a given social grouping. Social video marketing draws on consumer-culture theory, economic theory, and social theory around the psychology of sharing. Social video marketing differs from social marketing, which has the intent of influencing behavior for a social good.

Media publishers and content rights holders create social videos from TV, live video feeds and pre-recorded content in order to generate engagement on social platforms and drive media distribution. They use real-time video editing software to instantly create and share social videos in native formats such as vertical video for Snapchat and square video for Instagram. YouTube stands out as a paramount marketing tool for brands across diverse industries. A Wyzowl survey from 2021 revealed that 87% of video marketers endorsed YouTube for its effectiveness, solidifying its status as the preferred platform among video marketers.

== Distinguished from viral video marketing ==
Social video marketing is also distinct from viral marketing which is more closely aligned with the self-replicating nature of both “memorable and sufficiently” interesting content. In contrast to viral video where success is typically measured solely on the pass-along rate or the number of impressions, social video hinges on leveraging a deeper more contextual relationship between sharer and recipient.

Social videos tend to be passed along because of a shared interest or a sense of trust between the sender and recipient(s). Social videos attract conversation in either a one-to-one or a one-many relationship, with the comments and interactions becoming cumulative, rather than moving in a one-way trajectory, as in the case of not a viral video.

== Theories on social video and sharing ==
=== Historical context ===
Conditions which have made the market conducive to the rise of social video marketing:

- Falling cost of technology
- Cameras' ubiquity
- Increase of bandwidth and consumer access
- Computer speed/RAM
- Desktop publishing
- Rise of social networking sites

== Bibliography and References ==
“Why Do We Share Stories, News, and Information With Others?” - Psychological Science [3]
