= Fred Reichheld =

Author

- Born: 1952 (age 73–74); Cleveland, Ohio, US
- Education: Harvard Business School
- Writing career
- Genre: non-fiction
- Subjects: loyalty business model and loyalty marketing
- Notable work: The Loyalty Effect

Frederick F. Reichheld (born 1952) is an American New York Times best-selling author, speaker and business strategist. He is best known for his research and writing on the loyalty business model and loyalty marketing. He is the creator of the Net Promoter System of management (NPS).

== Early life and education ==
Reichheld graduated with a B.A. from Harvard College (1974) and an MBA from Harvard Business School (1978).

== Career ==
Reichheld is a Fellow of the management consultancy Bain & Company, where he has worked since 1977. In 2003, Consulting Magazine named him one of the world's top 25 consultants. According to The New York Times, he "put loyalty economics on the map." The Economist magazine called him "the high priest of the loyalty cult" in 2001.

== Writing ==
His books include The Loyalty Effect (1996), Loyalty Rules! (2001), and The Ultimate Question: Driving Good Profits and True Growth (2006). He has authored articles for business publications, including eight for the Harvard Business Review. He speaks on loyalty and other business topics at management conferences and similar events. His work on loyalty has been covered in The Wall Street Journal, New York Times, Financial Times, Fortune, Business Week and The Economist.

His 2011 book, The Ultimate Question 2.0: How Net Promoter Companies Thrive in a Customer-Driven World, was a New York Times Bestseller and co-authored by long-time collaborator, Rob Markey of Bain & Company. An updated and expanded version of his 2006 book, The Ultimate Question, it focuses on Net Promoter Score (NPS), a concept he developed based on his research in measuring customer satisfaction, customer retention and its link to revenue growth and profitability. This metric serves as an indicator of the loyalty and advocacy customers show for a company. In this new version of the book, Reichheld renames NPS the "Net Promoter system" to emphasize elements of the approach beyond the metric.

In 2021, Reichheld published a new book entitled "Winning on Purpose", along with two co-authors Darci Darnell and Maureen Burns. Topics include Net Promoter 3.0, and Fred's latest invention, called "Earned Growth", described as an accounting-based twin for Net Promoter Score.
