= Eric Bradlow =

American marketing academic

Eric Thomas Bradlow
- Title: K.P. Chao Professor, Professor of Marketing, Statistics and Education

Academic background
- Education: University of Pennsylvania; Harvard University
- Thesis: Analysis of Ordinal Survey Data with No Answer Responses (1994)
- Doctoral advisor: Alan M. Zaslavsky

Academic work
- Discipline: Marketing; Statistics; Psychometrics; Education
- Institutions: Wharton School; Educational Testing Services
- Website: https://marketing.wharton.upenn.edu/profile/ebradlow/

Eric Thomas Bradlow is K.P. Chao Professor, Professor of Marketing, Statistics, Education and Economics, Chairperson Wharton Marketing Department, and Vice-Dean of Analytics at the Wharton School of the University of Pennsylvania.

Eric Bradlow obtained his PhD and Master’s degrees from Harvard University in 1994 and 1990, respectively, and his BS from the Wharton School, University of Pennsylvania, in 1988. He worked at Educational Testing Service as an Associate Research Scientist before joining Wharton school in 1996. Eric Bradlow is a fellow of the American Statistical Association and a fellow the American Education Research Association. In 2006, he won the Technical or Scientific Contribution to the Field of Educational Measurement from the National Council on Measurement in Education.

== Books ==
- Wainer, H., Bradlow, E.T., and Wang, X. (2007), Testlet Response Theory and Its Applications, Cambridge University Press, ISBN 9780521681261.
- Bradlow, E.T., Niedermeier, K., Williams, P. (2009), Marketing in the Financial Services Industry, McGraw-Hill, New York.
