= The Loyalty Effect =

1996 book by Fred Reichheld

The Loyalty Effect: The Hidden Force Behind Growth, Profits, and Lasting Value
- The Loyalty Effect (Revised edition, 2001)
- Author: Fred Reichheld, Thomas A. Teal
- Language: English
- Subject: Human resource management
- Publisher: Harvard Business Review Press
- Publication date: 2001 (revised version)
- Media type: Paperback
- Pages: 352
- ISBN: 978-1578516872
- OCLC: 837730464

The Loyalty Effect is a 1996 book by Fred Reichheld of the consulting firm Bain & Company, and the book's title is also sometimes used to refer to the broader loyalty business model as a whole. Reichheld's book was exceptionally popular with marketing and customer relationship management professionals, and as such the phrase "loyalty effect" has become synonymous in some circles with the more generic concepts covered by the loyalty business model.

In 2001, Reichheld penned a sequel to the book called Loyalty Rules! and released a revised edition of the original work.

== Critical reception ==
A March 1996 Publishers Weekly review said Reichheld "takes an old-fashioned concept—loyalty—and shows its relevance to customer retention and long-term profit growth," adding that "his position seems obvious, but its import has been lost amid the rapid turnover in the current business climate."

== Bibliography ==
- Reichheld, Frederick F. The Loyalty Effect, Harvard Business School Press, 1996. (Revised 2001)
- Reichheld, Frederick F. Loyalty Rules!, Harvard Business School Press, 2001.
