= Service–profit chain =

Business management concept

The service–profit chain is the central concept in a theory of business management which links employee satisfaction to customer loyalty and profitability. It was proposed in an article in the Harvard Business Review in 1994 by James L. Heskett, W. Earl Sasser, and Leonard Schlesinger, and was later the subject of the book The Service Profit Chain – How Leading Companies Link Profit and Growth To Loyalty, Satisfaction and Value, published in 1997 by three of the same authors.

== See also ==
- Customer knowledge
