= Net promoter score =

Market research metric

Net promoter score (NPS) or Customer Net Promoter Score (cNPS) is a market research metric that is based on a single survey question asking respondents to rate the likelihood that they would recommend a company, product, or a service to a friend or colleague. The NPS was developed by Bain & Company consultant Fred Reichheld and has been widely adopted by large companies, initially being popularized in Reichheld's 2003 Harvard Business Review article.

== Methodology ==
The NPS assumes a subdivision of respondents into "promoters" who provide ratings of 9 or 10, "passives" who provide ratings of 7 or 8, and "detractors" who provide ratings of 6 or lower. Calculating the net promoter score involves subtracting the percentage of detractors from the percentage of promoters collected by the survey item.

The result of the calculation is typically expressed as an integer rather than a percentage. The core How likely would you be to recommend... question is almost always accompanied by an open-ended "Why?" and sometimes by so-called "driver" questions.

The NPS is typically interpreted and used as an indicator of customer loyalty. In some cases, it has been argued to correlate with revenue growth relative to competitors within an industry, although it has also been demonstrated that NPS scores vary substantially between industries. NPS has been widely adopted by Fortune 500 companies and other organizations. Its popularity and broad use have been attributed to its simplicity and transparent methodology. Proponents of the Net Promoter approach claim the score can be used to motivate an organization to become more focused on improving products and services. As of 2020, versions of the NPS are now used by two-thirds of Fortune 1000 companies.

A variation on NPS is Employee Net Promoter Score (eNPS), a measure of staff feelings about their workplace.

== Origins ==
The origins of NPS date to a 2003 Harvard Business Review article by Reichheld titled "The One Number You Need To Grow". Reichheld said he found the "would you recommend" question the best predictor of return business and word of mouth marketing, compared to equivalent questions like "How satisfied are you?", "Does this company deserve your loyalty?", and "Do you intend to return?".

Reichheld owns the registered NPS trademark in conjunction with Bain & Company and Satmetrix.

== Predicting customer loyalty ==
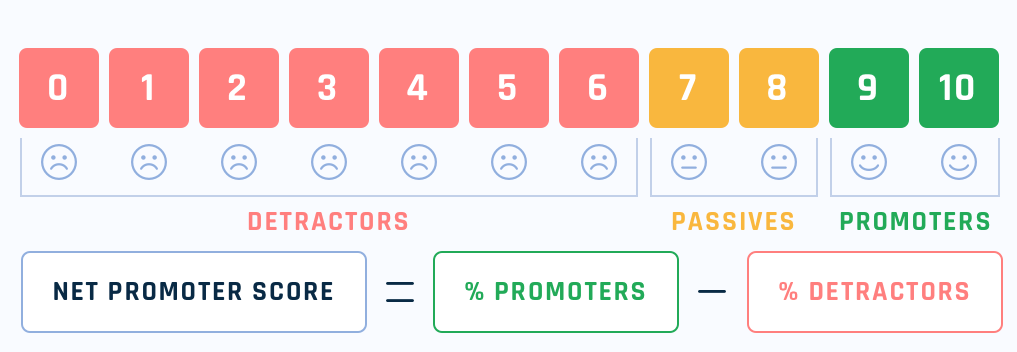
Net Promoter Score (NPS)

The primary objective of the net promoter score methodology is to infer customer loyalty (as evidenced by repurchase and referral) to a product, service, brand, or company on the basis of respondents' responses to a single survey item. NPS ratings reflect multiple underlying drivers of customer loyalty, including customer trust. The use of the NPS score in addition to revenue retention rates and customer retention rates may offer valuable customer insights and may offer a better predictability of customer loyalty rates.

As it represents responses to a single survey item, the validity and reliability of any corporation's NPS ultimately depend on collecting a large number of ratings from individual human users. However, market research surveys are typically distributed by email, and response rates to such surveys have been declining steadily in recent years. In the face of criticism of the net promoter score, the proponents of the net promoter approach claim that the "recommend" question is of similar predictive power to other metrics, but that it presents a number of practical benefits to other more complex metrics. Proponents also argue that analyses based on third-party data are inferior to those conducted by companies on their own customer sets, and that the practical benefits of the approach (including a short survey, a simple concept to communicate, and corporations' ability to follow up with customers) outweigh possible statistical inferiority to other metrics.

== Criticism ==
While the net promoter score has gained popularity among business executives and is considered a widely used instrument for measuring customer loyalty in practice, it has also generated controversy in academic and market research circles. Scholarly critique has questioned whether the NPS is at all a reliable predictor of company growth. Other researchers have noted that there is no empirical evidence that the "likelihood to recommend" question is a better predictor of business growth than other customer-loyalty questions (e.g., overall satisfaction, likelihood to purchase again, etc.), and that the "likelihood to recommend" question does not measure anything different from other conventional loyalty-related questions.

A further issue with NPS is that does not offer a detailed insight into specific issues or identify specific areas for improvement. Furthermore there is a concern of potential bias as NPS tends to focus on the extremes and devalues passive customers.

Many consumers in 2025 complain about being bombarded with too many requests for ratings. Reichheld himself criticized over-use as a "tragedy of the commons". He recommended tracking repeat customers and referrals by other means, and conducting a small number of conversations if needed to identify problems and opportunities for improvement.

Some employees face discipline, financial consequences, or firing if they get low ratings, and many complain that some of the factors that consumers put into ratings are beyond their control. Reichheld recommended de-linking NPS from employee compensation, saying it made employees care less about pleasing customers and more about getting a high rating.

== See also ==
- Advocacy Index – Customer survey technique
- EMO Index
- The Loyalty Effect – 1996 book by Fred Reichheld
- Relationship marketing – Form of marketing focused on customer retention
