= Suzanne Joinson =

British novelist and memoirist (fl. 2025)

Suzanne Joinson is a British writer and academic who has published two novels and a memoir, and is a reader in creative writing at the University of Chichester.

== Early life and education ==
Joinson grew up in Crewe on a council estate. Her parents met as teenagers and her mother became pregnant aged 19. Her mother Lynda worked in a garment factory, and her father, John, in a Rolls Royce factory. Her grandmothers were Welsh and Irish. Her parents joined the Divine Light Mission, and led a life of "constant meditation, the endless bowls of lentil soup, the marijuana, the LSD, the incense" and the throwing away of personal paper and other personal possessions.

Joinson worked for the British Council Literature Department before entering academe, travelling to places including China, Russia, the Middle East, North Africa and Western and Eastern Europe.

She has a doctorate from Goldsmiths, University of London, her thesis title being Making and Exhibition of Myself: On Life Narratives and Memoir and her research and teaching explore the myriad intersections of Fiction, Life Writing, Creative Nonfiction, Oral History and Visual Narratives.

== Writing and academic work ==
Johnson has said that she wrote a diary from the age of seven and "my first proper long story when I was 14 or 15". In 2007 she won the New Writing Ventures award for Creative Non-Fiction for her work Laila Ahmed, an account of finding, on a market stall, a collection of letters written to an Indian mother in London from her four daughters in India over 25 years, and of "finding out who she was, who does this story belong to and the morality of whether it's ok to use their story".

Joinson's first published novel, A Lady Cyclist's Guide to Kashgar (2012) features two early women missionaries in Kashgar 1923 and a young woman in present-day London who befriends a Yemeni refugee. It was longlisted for the 2104 Dublin Literary Award.

Her second novel, The Photographer's Wife (2016) centres on the life of Prue, an 11-year-old in Jerusalem in 1920 and later a wife and mother in Shoreham, Sussex. The reviewer for Kirkus Reviews called it "Atmospheric, romantic, yet refreshingly acerbic" and a "timely portrayal of the difficult relationships between different cultures". The Historical Novel Society's reviewer said that "While nonlinear narrative, fluctuating tense, and a shifting point of view can render a story confusing and disjointed when attempted by a less-skilled novelist, Joinson masterfully employs sub-plot and subtle detail to take the reader smoothly from character to character, decade to decade, and place to place."

Her memoir, The Museum of Lost and Fragile Things (2024) was published by Indigo Press, whose founder Susie Nicklin said of it "I am deeply impressed with both the seriousness and the lack of ego in this extraordinary memoir and can't wait to share it with readers worldwide". Andrew Hussey selected it as one of The New Statesman's "Books of the Year" and called it: "tender, sharp and finally as moving as it is unflinching." Rebecca Stott in TLS described the book as "a fever dream of a book, gripping and trippy".

She was awarded the British Library's 2020 National Life Stories Goodison Fellowship, to research the lives of three Sussex women: Juliet Pannett, Ann Sutton and Barbara Mullins.

Joinson has written for The Guardian, The Independent, The New York Times and elsewhere.

She is a reader in creative writing at the University of Chichester, where she teaches fiction and creative non-fiction. She is a member of the Folio Academy, the group of writers who nominate titles for The Writers' Prize.

== Personal life ==
Joinson describes her family as "a mosaic of neuroatypical individuals" and has a daughter who is neurodiverse. She lives in Worthing, West Sussex, and supports her local Green Party "because the planet is on fire".

== Selected publications ==
=== Novels ===
- Joinson, Suzanne (2012). A Lady Cyclist's Guide to Kashgar. Bloomsbury. ISBN 978-1408825143.
- Joinson, Suzanne (2016). The Photographer's Wife. Bloomsbury. ISBN 978-1408840771.

=== Short stories ===
- Joinson, Suzanne (2016). "Jasmine and Other Flowers that Make Me Cry". In George, Don (ed.). The Lonely Planet travel anthology: True Stories from the World's Best Writers. Lonely Planet. ISBN 978-1786571960.
- Joinson, Suzanne (2019). "Honeymoon at Richterswil Harbour". Still worlds turning: new short fiction. Belfast: No Alibis Press. pp. 189–199. ISBN 978-1999882259.
- Joinson, Suzanne (2015). "The Middle of the Air". 1ShortStory Anthology. Vanguard. pp. 104–113. ISSN 2056-6298.

=== Memoir ===
- Joinson, Suzanne (2024). The Museum of Lost and Fragile Things: A Year of Salvage. Indigo Press, The. ISBN 978-1911648680.

=== Academic publications ===
- Joinson, Suzanne (2022). "Between the Georgic and the Pastoral: The British Weald". In Bullard, Paddy (ed.). A History of English Georgic Writing. pp. 296–315. doi:10.1017/9781009019507.018.
- Joinson, Suzanne (2023). Narrating heritage: oral history and inclusive growth (PDF). British Council: Cultural Heritage for Inclusive Growth Collection.
- Joinson, Suzanne (2023). "Rev. of Image of a Man: A. Belsey, Liverpool University Press, 2020". a/b: Auto/Biography Studies. 39 (1): 486–489. doi:10.1080/08989575.2023.2254161.
