= Adam Joinson =

British academic (born 1970)

Adam N. Joinson
- Born: 1970 (age 55–56)
- Occupations: Author, Public Speaker in Cyberpsychology
- Employer: University of Bath
- Website: www.joinson.com

Adam N. Joinson (born 1970) is a British author, academic and public speaker within the area of cyberpsychology. He is Professor of Information Systems at University of Bath, following posts at the University of West of England and the Open University. and has conducted ground breaking research into the psychology of Internet usage.

== Education and career ==
Joinson studied for his undergraduate degree in Psychology at the University of London, Goldsmiths College in 1991. He then went to the University of Hertfordshire to obtain his PhD in Social Psychology in 1996.

He has written a number of books, journal articles and proceedings that discuss major themes of psychology such as Social Penetration Theory, Cognitive Dissonance and Expectancy violations theory. The titles of these books include "Understanding the Psychology of Internet Behaviour". He has also edited "The Oxford Handbook of Internet Psychology". He is a Programme Director of research on 'Understanding and Countering Online Behaviour' at the Centre for Research on Security Threats.

== Areas of Research ==
Joinson's research interests are focused on the interactions between people and technology. In particular, the nature of communication via technology, and the ways in which system design influences communication.

=== Findings ===
In 2000, Joinson and his team of scientists carried out a groundbreaking study which looked into the psychological consequences of e-mail communication. He asked 100 pairs of students (who did not know each other) to resolve a dilemma, either face-to-face or via e-mail. When presenting the team's findings at the British Psychological Society's London conference, Joinson stated that the participants "disclosed over four times as much when they communicated over the Internet as when they talked face-to-face". The study concluded that "e-mailing strips away inhibitions because it changes the rues of normal communications". However, with the addition of web cams to the study, the number of disclosures dropped immediately. This suggested that the use of e-mail gives a sense of "distance, anonymity and privacy".

In 2007, a project led by Joinson, Privacy and Self-Disclosure Online discovered that users who had previously demonstrated a high level of caution regarding online privacy would accept losses to their privacy if they trusted the recipient of their personal information. Out of all the participants studied, 56 per cent of Internet users stated that they had concerns about privacy when they were online. Joinson concluded the project by stating "one of the most interesting aspects of our findings, is that even people who genuinely have a high level of concern regarding privacy online may act in a way that is contrary to their stated attitudes when they come across a particular set of conditions".

In an interview with Interattivo in 2008, Joinson stated the findings of a study into the social networking site of Facebook and how the general public used it. His study included: "...two parts. In the first, 137 users were asked what they used Facebook for, what they most enjoyed about using the site, and what uses were most important to them. These responses were then clustered by trained raters. Selected answers from each cluster were then turned into a questionnaire that 241 people completed, and statistical techniques used to identify activities that occurred together.......A number of surprising findings emerged. First, the amount of time people spend on the site is predicted not by their number of friends, but by the amount they interact with the applications within Facebook. In fact, spending time interacting with applications was associated with having fewer friends on Facebook. Second, the majority of the respondents had changed their privacy settings, but some had made themselves more open, which was motivated by a desire to meet new people – so they made themselves 'discoverable'. Third, the frequency of visits to the site was motivated by an interest in photographs and in other people's news (via their 'status' updates)".

In 2010, Joinson spoke with The Daily Telegraph about his belief that social media may have negative effects on privacy and intimacy levels between people. He stated "as new technology and social media encourage sharing of the small details of everyday life, it also reduces privacy in social relationships, and may have negative effects on intimacy levels between people. If you desire intimacy, it may well be disastrous to add your partner to Facebook, or to follow them on Twitter".

=== Media Interviews ===
In 2002, a survey conducted by search engine AltaVista found that 80% of men claimed to be better surfers than their female partners. Joinson, asked by the BBC, suggested the findings bear out traditional gender stereotypes. He stated "as information has become such a valuable commodity, it's not surprising that men have transferred their traditional hunter-gatherer role to hunting for information on the web". Joinson however suggests that he would be "surprised if men's self-perceived superiority is grounded in fact".

== Bibliography ==
Joinson has published over 60 journal articles, and has released three books:

- Understanding the Psychology of Internet Behavior (2003) (ISBN 0333984684)
- The Oxford handbook of Internet psychology (2007) (ISBN 019956180X)
- Truth, Lies and Trust on the Internet (2009) (ISBN 184169584X)

=== Papers ===
- Joinson AN, Reips U.-D., Buchanan TB, & Paine-Schofield CB (2011) Privacy, Trust and Self-Disclosure Online Human-Computer Interaction 25(1): 1-24DOI: 10.1080/07370020903586662
- Vasalou, A., Joinson A.M.& Courvoisier D. (2010) Unpacking the nature of 'true commitment' in Facebook. International Journal of Human-Computer Studies. 68(10): 719–728.
- Vasalou, A., Joinson A. N., Banziger T, Goldie P & Pitt J. (2008) Avatars in social media: balancing accuracy, playfulness and embodied messages. external website International Journal of Human-Computer Studies. 66(11): 801–811. DOI: 10.1016/j.ijhcs.2008.08.002
- Joinson, A.N. & Reips, U.-D. 2007. Personalized salutation, power of sender and response rates to Web-based surveys. external website Computers in Human Behavior. 23 (3): 1372–1383. (DOI): 10.1016/j.chb.2004.12.011
- Joinson, A.N., Woodley, A. & Reips, U.-D. 2007. Personalization, authentication and self-disclosure in self-administered Internet surveys. external website Computers in Human Behavior. 23 (1): 275–285. (DOI): 10.1016/j.chb.2004.10.012
- Paine, C.B., Stieger, S., Reips, U-D., Joinson, A.N. and Buchanan, T. 2007. Internet users' perceptions of 'privacy concerns' and 'privacy actions'. external website International Journal of Human-Computer Studies. 65 (6): 526–536. (DOI): 10.1016/j.ijhcs.2006.12.001
- Vasalou, M., Joinson, A.N. & Pitt, J. 2007. Constructing my online self: avatars that increase self-focused attention. external website Proceedings of the SIGCHI conference on Human factors in computing systems(p. 445–448), ACM Press. (DOI): 10.1145/1240624.1240696
- Joinson, A.N., Paine, C., Buchanan, T. & Reips, U.-D. 2006. Watching me, watching you: Privacy attitudes and reactions to identity card implementation scenarios in the United Kingdom. Journal of Information Science. 32 (4): 334–343. (DOI): 10.1177/0165551506064902
- Buchanan, T., Paine, C.B., Joinson, A.N. & Reips, U.-D. 2006. Development of measures of online privacy concern and protection for use on the Internet. external website Journal of the American Society for Information Science and Technology. 58 (2): 157–165. (DOI): 10.1002/asi.v58:2
- Birchmeier, Z., Joinson, A.N. & Dietz-Uhler, B. 2005. Storming and forming a normative response to a deception revealed online. external website Computers in Human Behavior. 23 (1): 108–121. (DOI): 10.1177/0894439304271542
- Joinson, A.N. 2005. Deviance and the Internet – New challenges for social science. Computers in Human Behavior. 23 (1): 5–7. (DOI): N/A
- Joinson, A.N. 2004. Self-esteem, interpersonal risk, and preference for e-mail to face-to-face communication. external website Cyberpsychology & Behavior. 7 (4): 472–478. (DOI): 10.1089/cpb.2004.7.472.
- Joinson, A.N. & Banyard, P. 2003. Seeking alcohol information on the Internet. ASLIB Proceedings. 55 (5–6): 313–319. (DOI): 10.1108/00012530310498888
- Joinson, A. & Banyard, P. 2002. Psychological aspects of information seeking on the Internet. external website ASLIB Proceedings. 54 (2): 95–102. (DOI): 10.1108/00012530210435220
- Joinson, A.N. & Dietz-Uhler, B. 2002. Explanations for the perpetration of and reactions to deception in a virtual community. external website Social Science Computer Review. 20 (3): 275–289. (DOI): N/A
- Joinson, A.N. 2001. Knowing me, knowing you: Reciprocal self-disclosure in Internet-based surveys. external websiteCyberpsychology & Behavior. 4 (5): 587–591. (DOI): 10.1089/109493101753235179
- Joinson, A.N. 2001. Self-disclosure in computer-mediated communication: The role of self-awareness and visual anonymity. external website European Journal of Social Psychology. 31 (2): 177–192. (DOI): 10.1002/ejsp.36
