= Ela Veresiu =

Canadian-Romanian consumer sociologist

- Born: Bucharest, Romania
- Education: Ph.D.
- Alma mater: Witten/Herdecke University
- Known for: Consumer Diversity, Market Inclusion
- Awards: Ferber Award Honorable Mention, Sidney J. Levy Award
- Scientific career
- Fields: Marketing, Consumer Research
- Institutions: Schulich School of Business, York University
- Website: http://elaveresiu.com/

Ela Veresiu is a Canadian consumer sociologist and an associate professor of marketing at the Schulich School of Business, York University.

== Biography ==
Veresiu was born in Bucharest, Romania. She immigrated to Toronto, Canada, with her parents in 1995. In 2015, she completed her PhD degree in marketing, summa cum laude, at Witten/Herdecke University in Germany.

Ela Veresiu studies how markets, including both public and private sectors, can better serve underrepresented consumer groups. More specifically, her research focuses on consumer well-being and market belonging at the interplay of institutions, brands, technology, and identity. In 2019, her research was awarded the Ferber Award Honorable Mention for the best dissertation-based article published in the most recent volume of the Journal of Consumer Research. In 2019, her research was also awarded the prestigious Sidney J. Levy Award for outstanding dissertation-based, qualitative methodology marketing article published in a top-tier academic journal. Her work is funded by the Social Sciences and Humanities Research Council of Canada (SSHRC) Insight Development Grant and Insight Grant. In 2016, she was named “one of Canada’s marketing leaders under 30” and “one of the youngest business professors in North America.” In 2022, she was named "one of the Top 10 PR, Marketing and Communications Professors in Canada."

== Selected publications ==
- Robinson, Thomas Derek and Ela Veresiu (2024), “Timing Legitimacy: Identifying the Optimal Moment to Launch Technology in the Market,” Journal of Marketing.
- Veresiu, Ela (2023), “Delegitimizing Racialized Brands,” special issue of the Journal of the Association for Consumer Research: Racism and Discrimination in the Marketplace, 8 (1), 59-71.
- Hazzouri El, Mohammed, Rowan El-Bialy, Ela Veresiu, and Kelley Main (2023), “Consumer Experiences of (Dis)empowerment with Payday Loan Regulations,” Journal of Consumer Affairs, 57 (3), 1066–1088.
- Robinson, Thomas Derek, Ela Veresiu, and Ana Babic Rosario (2022), “Consumer Timework,” Journal of Consumer Research, 49 (1), 96–111.
- Robinson, Thomas Derek and Ela Veresiu (2021), “Advertising in a Context Harm Crisis,” Journal of Advertising Special Issue: Advertising and COVID-19, 50 (3), 221–229.
- Veresiu, Ela and Marie-Agnès Parmentier (2021), “Advanced Style Influencers: Confronting Gendered Ageism in Fashion and Beauty Markets,” special issue of Journal of the Association for Consumer Research: Genders, Markets, and Consumers, 6 (2), 263-273.
- Veresiu, Ela (2020), “The Consumer Acculturative Effect of State-Subsidized Spaces: Spatial Segregation, Cultural Integration, and Consumer Contestation,” Consumption, Markets & Culture, 23 (4), 342–360.
- Veresiu, Ela and Markus Giesler (2018), “Beyond Acculturation: Multiculturalism and the Institutional Shaping of an Ethnic Consumer Subject,” Journal of Consumer Research, 45 (3), 553–570.
- Castilhos, Rodrigo B., Pierre-Yann Dolbec, and Ela Veresiu (2017), “Introducing a Spatial Perspective to Analyze Marketing Dynamics,” Marketing Theory, 17 (1), 9-29.
- Giesler, Markus and Ela Veresiu (2014), “Creating the Responsible Consumer: Moralistic Governance Regimes and Consumer Subjectivity,” Journal of Consumer Research, 41 (3), 840–857.
