= Schulich School of Business =

School of York University, Toronto, Canada

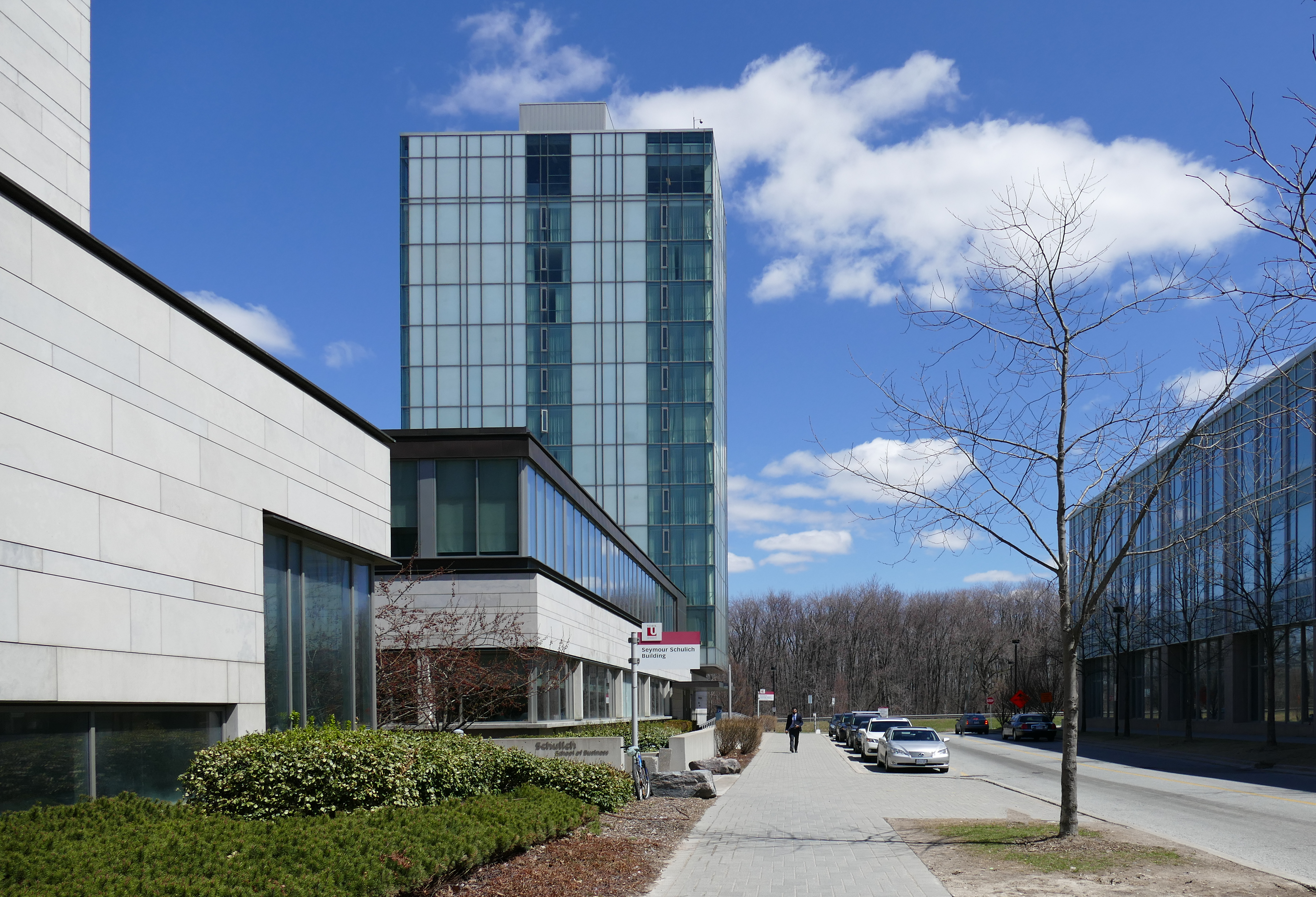
- The Seymour Schulich Building
- Former name: Faculty of Administrative Studies
- Type: Public business school
- Established: 1966; 60 years ago
- Parent institution: York University
- Accreditation: AMBA, EQUIS, PIM, PACIBER
- Dean: Detlev Zwick
- Academic staff: 86 (2025)
- Location: Toronto, Ontario, Canada; 43°46′23″N 79°29′55″W
- Campus: Urban
- Named for: Seymour Schulich
Colors
Blue and Green
- Website: schulich.yorku.ca

The Schulich School of Business is the business school of York University located in Toronto, Ontario, Canada. The institution provides undergraduate and graduate degree and diploma programs in business administration, finance, accounting, business analytics, public administration and international business as well as a number of PhD and executive programs. Originally known as the Faculty of Administrative Studies (FAS), it was renamed in 1995 after Seymour Schulich, a major benefactor who has donated $15 million to the school. The Dean of the School, Detlev Zwick, was appointed in 2021 after having served as Interim Dean for 15 months.

Primarily located at the Seymour Schulich Building on the Keele Campus in Toronto, Ontario, the school maintains an executive education centre in Toronto's Financial District and satellite campuses in Hyderabad, India, and Beijing, China. The school has satellite centres in Shanghai, Mumbai, Seoul, São Paulo, and Mexico City. Schulich offers undergraduate, graduate and postgraduate business degrees. Schulich pioneered Canada's first International MBA (IMBA) and International BBA (iBBA) degrees, as well as the Kellogg-Schulich Executive MBA.

== History ==
The Schulich School of Business was known as the Faculty of Administrative Studies which was founded in 1966. Before the establishment of the Seymour Schulich Building on the Keele Campus in 2003, the school was run from a York University building, currently renamed as Health, Nursing & Environmental Studies Building. In 1995, following a major monetary donation from Canadian billionaire Seymour Schulich, the school underwent a series of changes that created the present-day Schulich School of Business.

== Campuses ==
=== Seymour Schulich Building ===
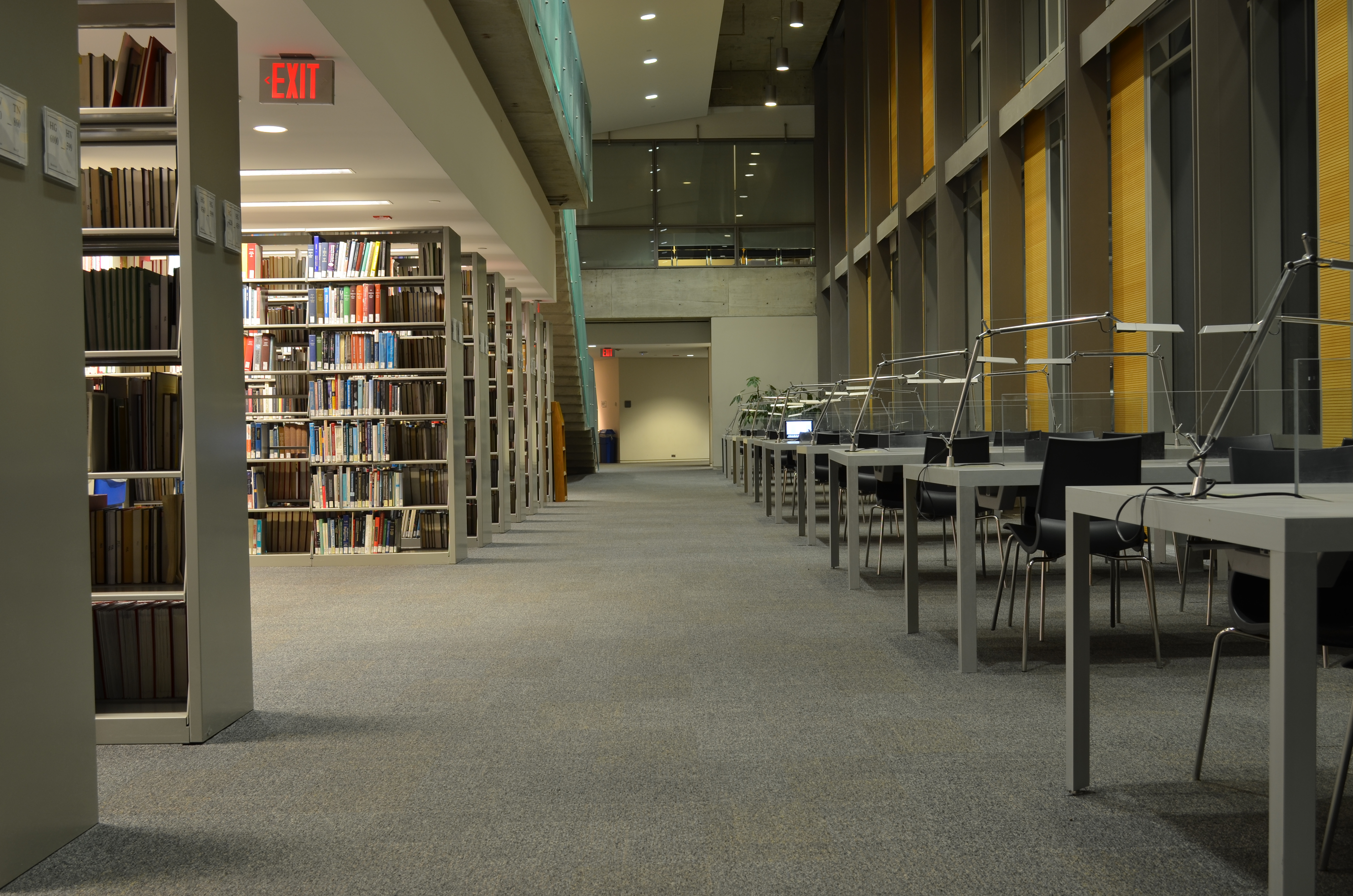
Peter F. Bronfman Business Library

The Seymour Schulich Building opened in August 2003 and cost $102 million. The building was jointly designed by Siamak Hariri and Robbie Young + Wright Architectural and was awarded the Governor General's Medal in Architecture in 2006. The Seymour Schulich Building and its Executive Learning Centre houses the Peter F. Bronfman Business Library, Executive Dining Room, Robert R. McEwen Auditorium, York Entrepreneurship Development Institute, Tuchner's Pub & Eatery, Starbucks, the central courtyard, the Executive Learning Centre hotel, and small lecture halls.

In December 2017, the $120 million York University Station opened directly across from the Seymour Schulich Building's main entrance. Designed by Foster + Partners, the station design uses natural light to try to subtly guide passengers from the entrance down to the platforms. With the Line 1 Yonge–University subway running underneath a lecture hall on Schulich's East Wing, in 2021, Metrolinx conducted a study to analyse the latest sound and vibration technology that was used to plan and design the Yonge North Subway Extension.

=== Rob and Cheryl McEwen Graduate Study & Research Building ===
The Rob and Cheryl McEwen Graduate Study & Research Building opened in 2019—attributed to an $8 million donation from the McEwen family. The $50 million 67,000 square-foot facility was designed by the firm Baird Sampson Neuert Architects, it has received LEED Gold certification. Centered around an atrium, the building houses a Seattle's Best Coffee café, a student marketplace, a fitness and wellness centre, and a landscaped outdoor courtyard.

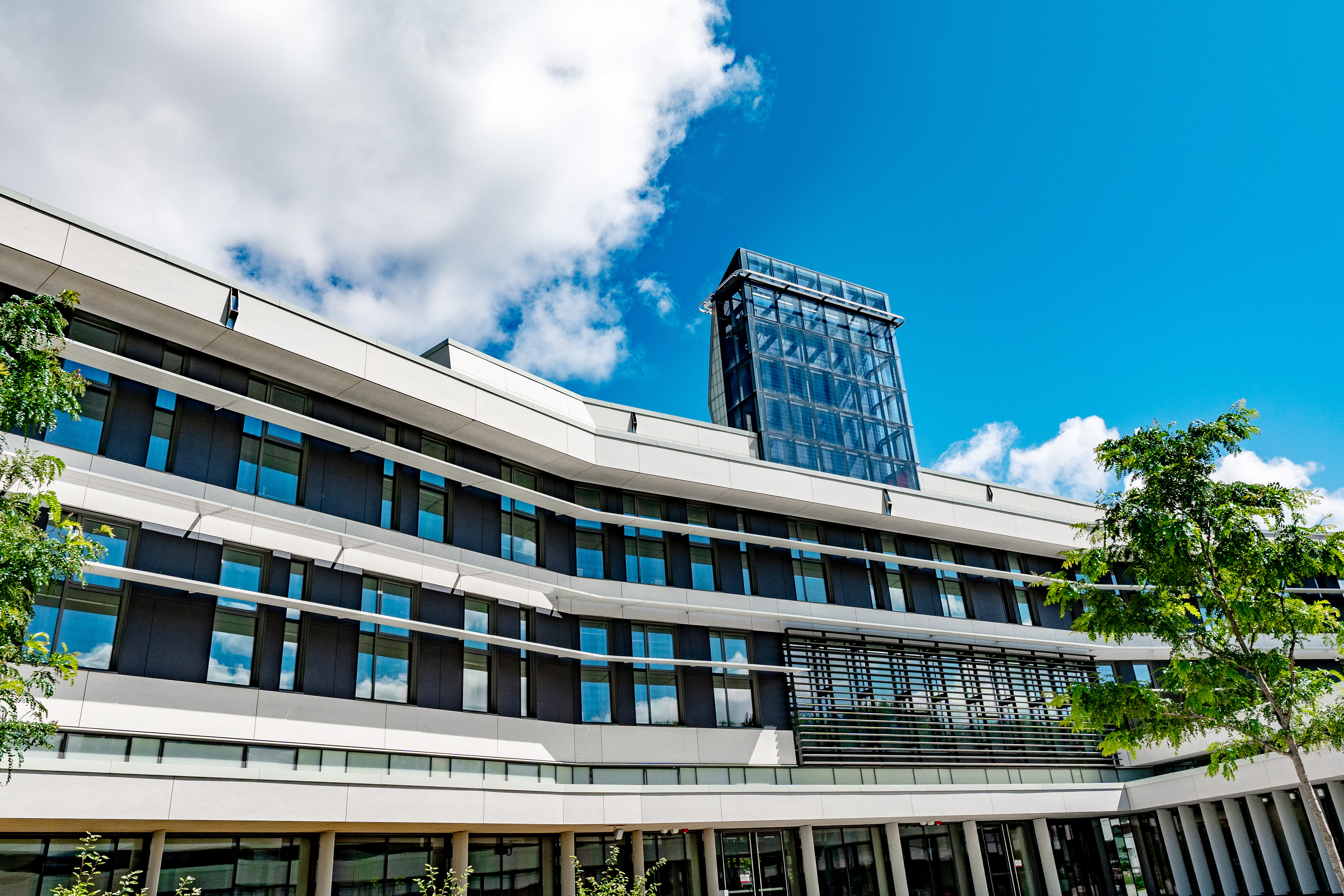
Rob and Cheryl McEwen Graduate Study & Research Building

=== Miles S. Nadal Management Centre ===
Management programs are held in downtown Toronto at the Miles S. Nadal Management Centre, which is located at 222 Bay Street in the Toronto-Dominion Centre.

=== India Campus ===
In 2014, Schulich opened a $100 million satellite campus in Hyderabad, India, a collaboration with the GMR School of Business. The campus gives students the opportunity to complete their India MBA consisting of a first year spent in India followed by a second year in Toronto.

== Graduate programs ==
The Schulich School of Business offers a number of graduate degree programs. The School currently offers 17 specializations within the MBA curriculum as well as part-time and accelerated degree options.

== Undergraduate programs ==
Schulich offers the undergraduate programs on BBA (Bachelor of Business Administration with Honours) and iBBA (International Bachelor of Business Administration with Honours). Students applying to the BBA/iBBA program must have at least a low 90s high school average. In the applicant process, applicants must submit a Supplementary Information Form that includes a summary of the organizations, sports teams, volunteers or paid work that the applicant has been involved in, and there are three video interview questions along with a five-minute written portion.

The BBA and iBBA programs together enrol around 400 students (300 for BBA and 100 for iBBA) from an average of 5,500 to 6,000 applicants per year, with an average applicant to admission ratio of around 14 to 1. Delayed entry students who have studied one year at another school are also allowed to apply. However, there are only a limited number of spaces reserved for the delayed entry stream.

=== Academics ===
Students can choose to specialize in up to two areas, such as: Accounting, Economics, Entrepreneurship and Family Business, Finance, International Business, Marketing, Organization Studies, Operations Management & Information Systems, and Strategic Management. iBBA students are required to complete one semester of study abroad at one of Schulich's partner schools and to take a foreign language course every year. Undergraduate students in the BBA and iBBA programs also have the option of pursuing a Certificate in Managing International Trade and Investment.

=== International exchange ===
Any student enrolled in the BBA/iBBA program may apply for one Study Abroad term. Students may apply for a full academic year only when a full year option is available. The exchange term could either be the second semester of Year 3, or first and second semester of Year 4.

Schulich partners with 64 exchange partner universities in 30 different countries. Exchange partners include Esade Business School, HEC Paris, Bocconi University, and the National University of Singapore. Exchange is a part of iBBA students' graduation requirements. BBA students are allowed to participate in exchange. Select undergraduate students also have the option of completing a joint degree with the Guanghua School of Management at Peking University. Students who graduate from the Schulich-Guanghua joint program receive both a Bachelor of Business Administration (BBA or iBBA) from the Schulich School of Business and a Bachelor of Arts in Management from the Guanghua School of Management.

== Rankings ==
Business school rankings

Global MBA Rankings
- QS (2026): 81

Schulich has placed in national and international business school rankings.

- 1st in Canada and 37th in the world in Executive MBA rankings by Financial Times.
- 4th in Canada and 16th in the MBA programs integrating sustainability into the curriculum by Corporate Knights.
- 7th in Maclean's ranking of Canadian business schools.

=== Canadian MBA Alliance ===
The school is also a founding member of the Canadian MBA Alliance, which was created in 2013. All six members of the alliance rank among the world's top 100 schools, according to their participation in key rankings—Financial Times, Business Week, and The Economist.

== Notable faculty ==
- Dezsö Horvath, CM, Dean Emeritus, Dean from 1988 to 2020 and 2004 Academy of International Business "Dean of the Year"
- James Gillies, First dean of York University's Faculty of Administrative Studies, now named the Schulich School of Business
- James Fleck, Former associate dean and MBA program director
- Gareth Morgan, Pioneer in the field of organizational behavior and change management. Co-creator of the Burrell Morgan framework
- Markus Giesler, Schulich Marketing Professor, named one of the 40 best business school professors under the age of 40 in the world
- Russell Belk, Professor of Marketing, inducted into the Order of Canada in 2017. World-leading expert on consumer culture, consumption and the self.
- Robert Phillips, George R. Gardiner Professor in Business Ethics
- Ellen Auster, Professor of Strategic Management
- Stephen E. Weiss, Professor of Policy and International Business

== Notable alumni ==
- Janice Fukakusa, Former CFO of RBC and Chancellor of Ryerson University
- Daniel Dale, fact-checker for CNN, formerly Washington bureau chief of the Toronto Star
- Sheelagh Whittaker, Canadian business executive and author, the first female CEO of a TSX listed company
- Bharat Masrani, Group President and CEO of TD Bank Group
- Rob McEwen, Chairman and CEO of US Gold Corporation and Lexam Explorations, Founder and former chairman and CEO of Goldcorp
- Richard E. Waugh, President and CEO of Scotiabank
- Craig Kielburger, Founder of Free The Children
- David Wilson, Chairman of the Ontario Securities Commission
- Edmund Ho, First Chief Executive of the Macau Special Administrative Region, current Vice-Chairman of the Chinese People's Political Consultative Conference
- Kathleen Taylor, President and CEO of Four Seasons Hotels, Chair Designate of Royal Bank of Canada
- Neelam Verma, Finalist at Miss Universe and television anchor
- Ronald Klaas Otto Kers, Dutch businessman and former CEO of Müller
- Bonnie Crombie, Former mayor of Mississauga, Ontario and leader of the Ontario Liberal Party
- Kim Parlee, VP of Wealth Management at TD Canada Trust and host of Business News Network's MoneyTalk
- Eileen de Villa, physician and Medical Officer of Health for the City of Toronto
- John Hunkin, Former President and CEO of CIBC, Former President of Investment and Corporate Banking Wood Gundy, Former President of Investment and Corporate Banking CIBC World Markets
- Omar Alghabra, Federal Minister of Transport
- Ellis Jacob, President and CEO of Cineplex Inc
- Helena Jaczek, Minister of Federal Economic Development Agency for Southern Ontario
- Tony Staffieri, President & CEO, Rogers Communications and Director at MLSE
- Michael Rousseau, President and CEO of Air Canada
- William Andrew Dimma, Former President of Torstar Corporation, Former President and CEO of Royal LePage, Chairman of Great Canadian Entertainment
- Stephen Hudson, CEO of ECN Capital
- Joel H. Cohen, Producer and writer for Saturday Night Live, Suddenly Susan and The Simpsons
- Robert J. Gemmell, Director at Rogers Communications and Former President and CEO of Citigroup Global Markets Canada Inc.
- Frank M. Vettese, Director, RBC Board and Retired Managing Partner & CEO of Deloitte Canada
- Andrew Prozes, Former CEO of LexisNexis
- Ron Mock, Retired President & CEO Ontario Teachers' Pension Plan
- Claude LeBlanc, President & CEO of Ambac Financial Group Inc.
- M. Marianne Harris, Director at Loblaw Companies and Sun Life Financial, Former Managing Director and President, Corporate and Investment Banking for Merrill Lynch Canada Inc.
- Robert Charles Wong, Former Member of the Legislative Assembly of Ontario
- Angela Brown, President and Chief Executive Officer Moneris Solutions Corporation
- Iqwinder Gaheer, Member of Parliament for Mississauga—Malton
- Alan G. McNally, Former CEO and chairman of Harris Bank
- Majid Jowhari, Canadian politician with the Liberal Party of Canada, Member of Parliament for Richmond Hill
- Leslyn Lewis, Member of Parliament for Haldimand—Norfolk
- Yvan Baker, Member of Parliament for Etobicoke Centre
- Philip Lawrence, Member of Parliament for Northumberland—Peterborough South
- John Ruffolo, Founder of Maverix Private Equity & Founder and Former Chief Executive Officer of OMERS Ventures
- Eillen Mercier, Chancellor of Wilfrid Laurier University, Board member of OTTP, CGI Group, Intact Financial, ING Bank of Canada and Teekay
- Anna M. Ewing, Former Executive VP and CIO at NASDAQ OMX
- Grant Rasmussen, Former President & CEO UBS Canada
- Todd Skinner, President, International TransUnion, Former President and CEO of HSBC Financial Canada
- Jerome Dwight, President & CEO of The Bank of New York Mellon Canada
- Dan Daviau, President & Chief Executive Officer of Canaccord Genuity Group
- Tara Rivers, Caymanian politician, currently the Minister of Financial Services and Home Affairs, and previously the Minister of Education
- Peter John Sloly, Chief of police for the Ottawa Police Service, Former player for Canada men's national soccer team
- Tobias C. Enverga Jr., Canadian senator representing the province of Ontario
- Gerald William Cotten, Founder and CEO of Quadriga Fintech Solutions
- Tony Arrell, Founder and Former CEO of Burgundy Asset Management
- Carol Anne Letheran, Former CEO of the Canadian Olympic Association
- Katherine Henderson, President and CEO of Curling Canada and Hockey Canada
- Bojana Sentaler, Fashion Designer and founder of Sentaler fashion brand

== Student clubs ==
There are two student government bodies at Schulich:

- At the undergraduate level, students can participate in annual elections to become representatives in the Undergraduate Business Society (UBS).
- Graduate students can also be elected as their student body representatives in the Graduate Business Council.

Additionally, students can become members of and hold positions in various student organizations. Each of these organizations solicits membership from newly admitted students at the Club Fair, which takes place during the first week of classes.

== Publications ==
The Schulich School of Business releases a quarterly alumni magazine called the Exchange (stylized as in all lowercase).
