= Markus Giesler =

Canadian economist (born 1976)

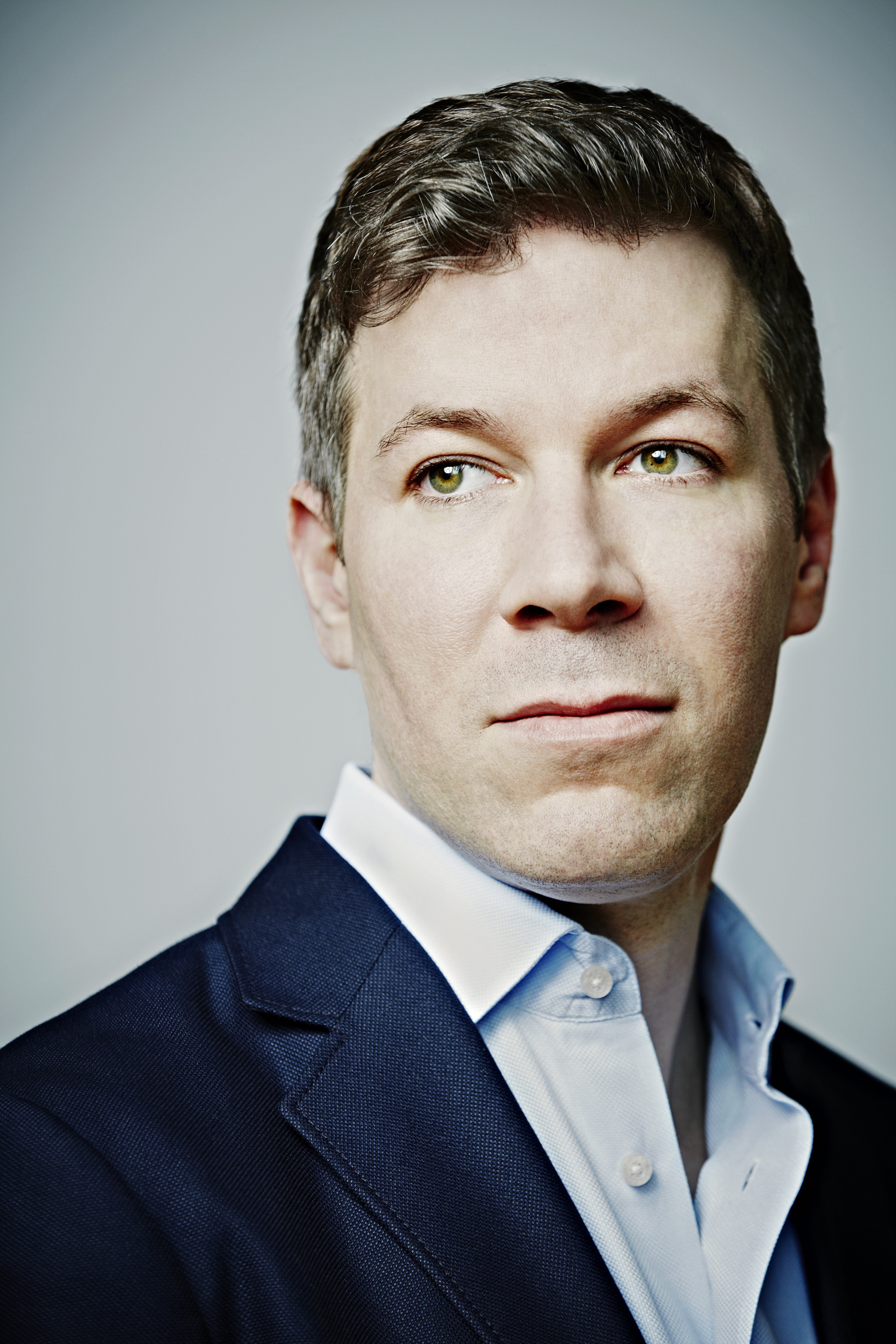
- Born: Iserlohn, Germany
- Education: Witten/Herdecke University
- Occupations: Author, Marketing Professor
- Scientific career
- Fields: Marketing; Consumer research
- Workplaces: York University, Schulich School of Business
- Website: www.mgiesler.com

Markus Giesler is a consumer sociologist and Professor of Marketing at the Schulich School of Business at York University. His research examines how ideas and things such as products, services, experiences, technologies, brands, and intellectual property acquire value over time, technology consumption, moral consumption, and the role of multiple stakeholders in the market creation process. Before doing his PhD in marketing, Giesler spent ten years operating his own record label and recording business in Germany. In 2014, he was named "one of the most outstanding business school professors under 40 in the world." Giesler is also the creator of the "Big Design" blog, which develops a sociological perspective on marketing, market creation, and customer experience design.

Markus Giesler was born in Iserlohn, and studied economics, management, and marketing at Witten/Herdecke University. He emigrated to Canada in 2004.

== Selected publications ==
- 'Consumers and Artificial Intelligence: An Experiential Perspective' with Stefano Puntoni, Rebecca Reczek Walker, and Simona Botti Journal of Marketing, forthcoming 2020.
- 'Creating a Consumable Past: How Memory Making Shapes Marketization' with Katja H. Brunk and Benjamin J. Hartmann Journal of Consumer Research, 44, April 2018, pp. 1325–1342.
- 'Beyond Acculturation: Multiculturalism and the Institutional Shaping of an Ethnic Consumer Subject' with Ela Veresiu Journal of Consumer Research, 45, October 2018, pp. 553–570.
- 'A Tutorial in Consumer Research: Process Theorization in Cultural Consumer Research' with Craig J. Thompson Journal of Consumer Research, 43, December 2016, pp. 497–508.
- 'Creating the Responsible Consumer: Moralistic Governance Regimes and Consumer Subjectivity' with Ela Veresiu, Journal of Consumer Research, 41, October 2014, pp. 849–867.
- 'Discursivity, Difference, and Disruption: Genealogical Reflections on the CCT Heteroglossia' with Eric Arnould and Craig Thompson, Marketing Theory, 13, June 2013, pp. 149–174.
- 'How Doppelgänger Brand Images Influence the Market Creation Process: Longitudinal Insights from the Rise of Botox Cosmetic', Journal of Marketing, 76, November 2012, pp. 55–68.
- 'Consumer Identity Work as Moral Protagonism: How Myth and Ideology Animate a Brand-Mediated Moral Conflict', with Marius Luedicke and Craig Thompson, Journal of Consumer Research, 36, April 2010, pp. 1016–1032.
- 'Conflict and Compromise: Drama in Marketplace Evolution', Journal of Consumer Research, 34, April 2008, pp. 739–753.
- 'Consumer Gift Systems', Journal of Consumer Research, 33, September 2006, pp. 283–290.
