= Carsten Herrmann-Pillath =

German economist and sinologist

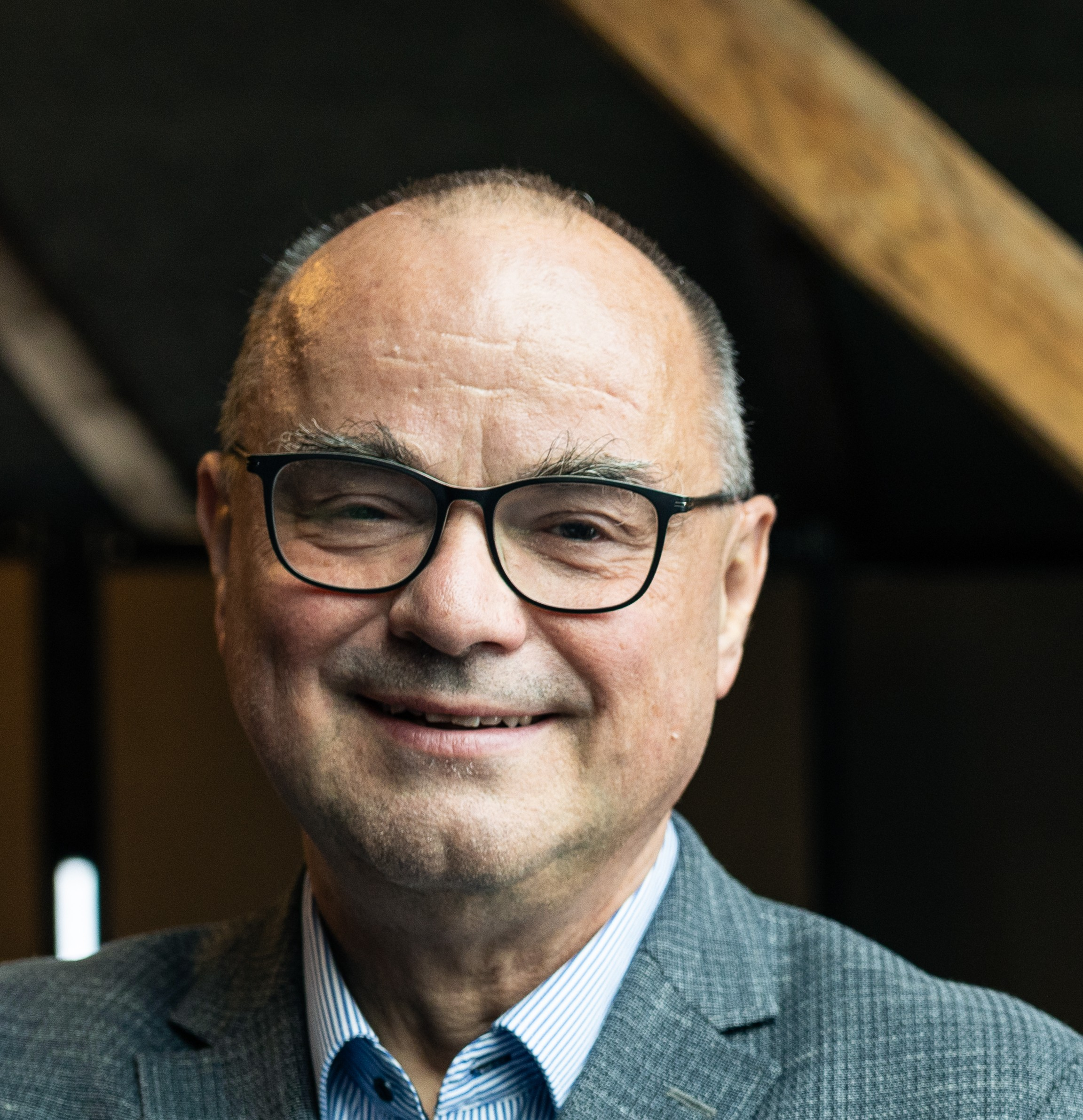
Carsten Herrmann-Pillath.

Carsten Herrmann-Pillath (born 24 February 1959 in Dessau, Bezirk Halle) is a German economist, sinologist, and philosopher of economics. He is the professor of Economics and Permanent Fellow at the Max Weber Centre for Advanced Cultural and Social Studies, Erfurt University, Germany.

== Career ==
After education in economics and classical Chinese studies he received a PhD in economics at the University of Cologne, Germany (1978–1988). Between 1988 and 1992 he was researcher, China desk, at the Federal Institute of East European and International Studies, Cologne. In 1992 he was appointed professor in Chinese economic studies at the Gerhard Mercator University of Duisburg, Germany. Between 1996 and 2008 he was chair of Evolutionary and Institutional Economics and director of the Institute of Comparative Research into Culture and Economy at the Private University of Witten/Herdecke, Germany, where he also founded the Sino-German School of Governance (2005–2010). In 2008, he moved to Frankfurt School of Finance and Management and established the East West Centre for Business Studies and Cultural Science, combined with a Master Program in International Business, as a successor organization of the school. Between 2015 and 2016, he resumed a position as Professor of Economics and Evolutionary Sciences at Witten/Herdecke University. In May 2016, he was appointed Permanent Fellow at the Max Weber Centre. He is distinguished visiting professor at the Beijing Normal University, Cina. Herrmann-Pillath is a leading representative of evolutionary economics and Chinese studies in Germany. His research aims at developing a cross-disciplinary theory of the economy which takes account of institutional and cultural embeddedness. Building on modern philosophical resources (ontology, philosophy of language), he approaches economics as a bridging science between the natural sciences and the humanities.

== Research ==
Carsten Herrmann-Pillath contributed widely to the cross-disciplinary foundations of economics, with applications in empirical research and policy design, especially in research on the Chinese economy and international trade policy. His essential philosophical resources are Hegel and Peirce. In the field of evolutionary and ecological economics, he proposes a theory of economic growth that takes the concepts of energy and information as fundamental building blocks. This theory has been expanded to a theory of the technosphere as emergent level of Earth system evolution. He proposes a naturalistic theory of institutions, taking money as a central application, which combines modern neuroeconomics and behavioural economics with Masahiko Aoki's theory of institutions. His synthesis is grounded on a semiotic and evolutionary reformulation of neuroeconomics. His institutional theory focuses on the notion of ‘performativity’ and ties up with recent developments in sociology and philosophy (actor-network theory, science and technology studies). In the field of international economics, he proposes the new paradigm of ‘deliberative trade policy’, with applications on the WTO. His long-time research on China has been condensed in a cultural theory of the Chinese economy, that centres on the concept of ‘ritual’. Currently, he works on a ‘critical theory of the economy’. His long-time research on China has been condensed in a cultural theory of the Chinese economy, that centres on the concept of ‘ritual’. In his recent work (together with Stephan Bannas) he has suggested the radical transformation of the modern capitalist economy, with key features such as geocentrism, definancialization, the abolition of all forms of limiting personal liability, and a new model of Universal Basic Income. His work has been synthesized in the textbook co-authored with Christian Hederer "A New Principles of Economics: The Science of Markets" (2023, Chinese translation 2024). He continues with paradigm-changing research on embodiment in economics (in collaboration with Frédéric Basso, LSE) and a new approach to ecosystem ownership. This approach has been extended to a new theory of “having” and “havings” which takes the place of the established understanding of property and property rights.

== Important works ==
=== Books (selection) ===
- Foundations of Economic Evolution. A Treatise on the Natural Philosophy of Economics. Edward Elgar, Cheltenham 2013, ISBN 978-1-84720-474-5
- with Ivan Boldyrev, Hegel, Institutions and Economics: Performing the Social, Routledge, Abingdon and New York 2014, ISBN 978-1-315-84866-2
- China's Economic Culture: The Ritual Order of State and Markets, Routledge, Abingdon and New York 2016, ISBN 978-1-315-88465-3
- Herrmann-Pillath, Carsten, Guo Man and Feng Xingyuan (2020): Ritual and Economy in Metropolitan China: A Global Social Science Approach, Routledge. ISBN 978-1-138-39197-0
- Carsten Herrmann-Pillath and Christian Hederer´(2023), A New Principles of Economics: The Science of Markets, Routledge, ISBN 978-0-367-55719-5
- Frédéric Basso and Carsten Herrmann-Pillath (2024), Embodiment, Political Economy and Human Flourishing: An Embodied Cognition Approach to Economic Life, Palgrave Macmillan, ISBN 978-3-031-54970-0
- Carsten Herrmann-Pillath (2024), Havings. Steps towards a New Economic Philosophy of Property and Beyond. Structural Change of Property, volume 7. Frankfurt: Campus Verlag, 2024. ISBN 9783593519760

=== Academic articles (selection) ===
- with Simo Sarkki, Timo Maran, Katriina Soini, Juha Hiedanpää, Nature-based solutions as more-than-human art: Co-evolutionary and co-creative design approaches, Nature-Based Solutions, Volume 4, 2023, 100081, doi:10.1016/j.nbsj.2023.100081
- With Guo Man, The Cultural Governance of Death in Shenzhen, The China Quarterly, Vol 254, June 2023, pp. 396 - 411 doi:10.1017/S0305741022001898
- The universal commons: An economic theory of ecosystem ownership, Ecological Economics, Volume 208, 107822, 2023. doi:10.1016/j.ecolecon.2023.107822
- "Evolutionary mechanisms of choice: Hayekian perspectives on neurophilosophical foundations of neuroeconomics". Economics and Philosophy, 1–20. 2021. doi:10.1017/S0266267120000371
- with Guo Man, "Interaction ritual chains and religious economy: Explorations on ritual in Shenzhen". Identities, 2021. doi:10.1080/1070289X.2021.1911474
- "Power, ideas and culture in the ‘longue durée’ of institutional evolution: Theory and ap-plication on the revolutions of property rights". Russia, Journal of Evolutionary Economics, 29(5), 1483–1506, 2019. doi:10.1007/s00191-019-00624-z
- "From dual systems to dual function: Rethinking methodological foundations of behavioural economics". Economics & Philosophy, 35(3), 403–422. 2019. doi:10.1017/S0266267118000378
- "The Case for a New Discipline: Technosphere Science". Ecological Economics, 149, 212–225, 2018, doi:10.1016/j.ecolecon.2018.03.024
- "Constitutive explanations in neuroeconomics: Principles and a case study on money". Journal of Economic Methodology. 23 (4): 374–395. 2016 doi:10.1080/1350178X.2016.1218531
- "Fei Xiaotong's comparative theory of Chinese culture: Its relevance for contemporary cross-disciplinary research on Chinese ‘collectivism’". Copenhagen Journal of Asian Studies 34(1), 2016, 25–57, http://rauli.cbs.dk/index.php/cjas/article/view/5187
- Herrmann-Pillath, Carsten (2016). "Constitutive explanations in neuroeconomics: Principles and a case study on money". Journal of Economic Methodology. 23 (4): 374–395. doi:10.1080/1350178X.2016.1218531. S2CID 147919637.
