= Economic materialism =

Excessive desire to acquire and consume material goods

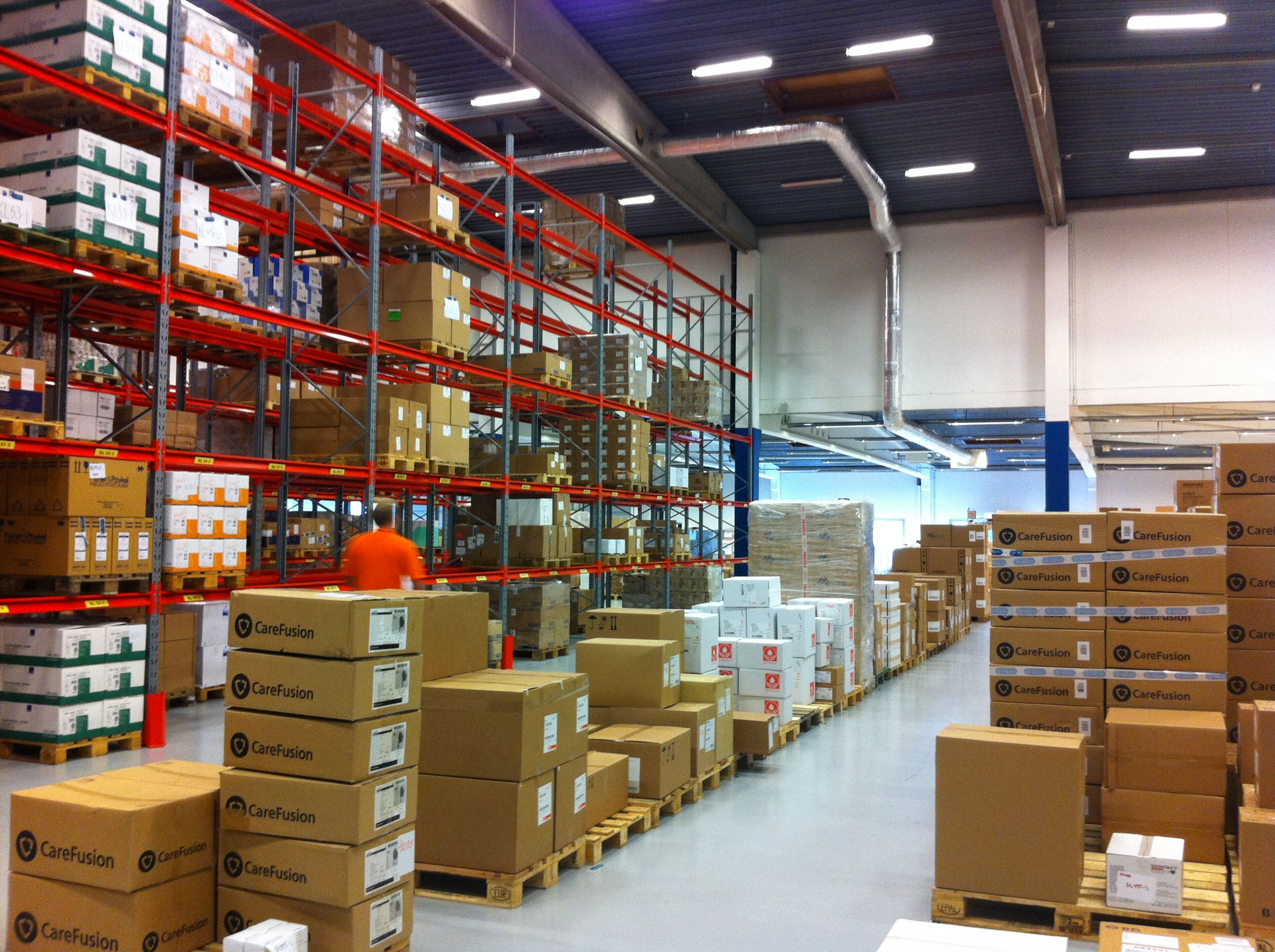
Material goods stacked in a warehouse

Economic materialism, known colloquially simply as materialism, is a personal attitude that attaches importance to acquiring (and often consuming) material goods. The use of the term "materialistic" to describe an individual's personality or a society tends to have a negative or critical connotation. Rarely also called acquisitiveness, it is often associated with a value system that regards social status as being determined by affluence (see conspicuous consumption), as well as the belief that possessions can provide happiness, which has been critiqued as a lie brought about by capitalism. Environmentalism can be considered a competing orientation to materialism.

The definition of materialism coincides with how and why resources to extract and create the material object are logistically formed. "Success materialism" can be considered a pragmatic form of enlightened self-interest based on a prudent understanding of the character of market-oriented economy and society.

== Definition ==
Consumer research typically looks at materialism in two ways: one as a collection of personality traits; and the other as an enduring belief or value.

=== Materialism as a personality trait ===
Russell W. Belk conceptualizes materialism to include three original personality traits:

- Nongenerosity – an unwillingness to give or share possessions with others.
- Envy – desire for other people's possessions.
- Possessiveness – concern about loss of possessions and a desire for the greater control of ownership.

=== Materialism as a value ===
Acquisition centrality is when acquiring material possession functions as a central life goal with the belief that possessions are the key to happiness and that success can be judged by a person's material wealth and the quality and price of material goods she or he can buy.

== Growing materialism in the Western world ==
In the Western world, there is a growing trend of increasing materialism in reaction to discontent. Research conducted in the United States shows that recent generations are focusing more on money, image, and fame than ever before, especially since the generations of Baby Boomers and Generation X.

In one survey of Americans, over 7% said they would seriously consider murdering someone for $3 million and 65% of respondents said they would spend a year on a deserted island to earn $1 million.

A survey conducted by the University of California and the American Council on Education on 250,000 new college students found that their main reason for attending college was to gain material wealth. From the 1970s to the late 1990s, the percentage of students who stated that their main reason for going to college was to develop a meaningful life philosophy dropped from 73% to 44%, while the purpose of obtaining financial gain rose from about 44% to 75%.

== Materialism and happiness ==
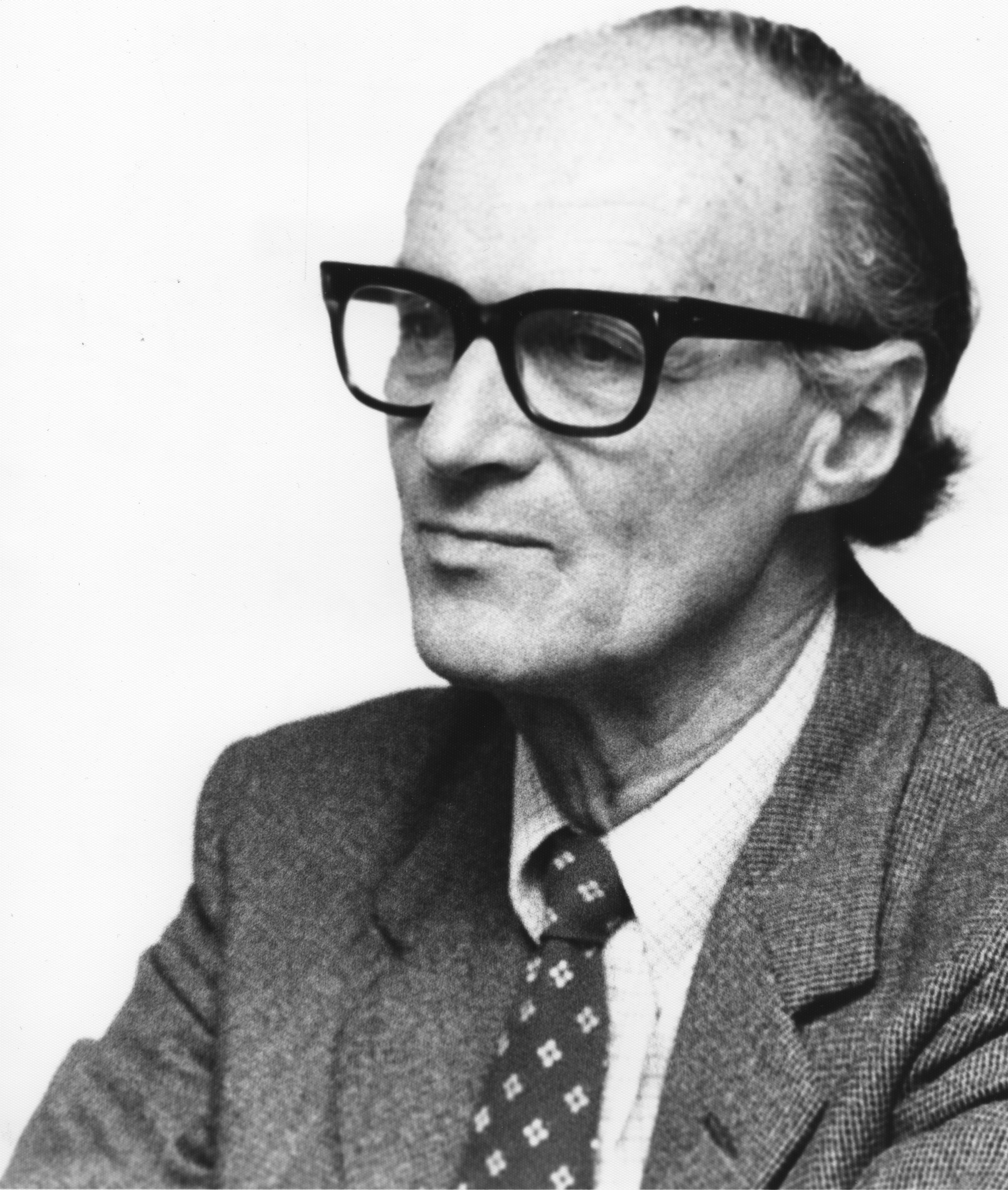
Tibor Scitovsky

A series of studies have observed a correlation between materialism and unhappiness. Studies in the United States have found that an increase in material wealth and goods in the country has had little to no effect on the well-being and happiness of its citizens. Tibor Scitovsky called this a "joyless economy" in which people endlessly pursue comforts to the detriments of pleasures.

Using two measures of subjective well-being, one study found that materialism was negatively related to happiness, meaning that people who tended to be more materialistic were also less happy with themselves and their lives. When people derive a lot of pleasure from buying things and believe that acquiring material possessions are important life goals, they tend to have lower life satisfaction scores. Materialism also positively correlates with more serious psychological issues like depression, narcissism and paranoia.

However, the relationship between materialism and happiness is more complex. The direction of the relationship can go both ways. Individual materialism can cause diminished well-being or lower levels of well-being can cause people to be more materialistic in an effort to get external gratification.

In many East Asian cultures, the relationship between materialism, happiness, and well-being are associated with neutral or positive feelings. In China, materialism is often motivated by and through social relations, like families or villages, rather than an individualist pursuit of wealth. This suggests that materialism in interdependent, community-oriented cultures, like in China and Japan, may improve well-being and happiness rather than harm them. However, even in independent cultures, people with social motives to acquire wealth may view materialism positively, indicating that the relationship between materialism and happiness is more complex than cultural differences.

Instead, research shows that purchases made with the intention of acquiring life experiences, such as going on a family vacation, make people happier than purchases made to acquire material possessions such as an expensive car. Even just thinking about experiential purchases makes people happier than thinking about material ones. A survey conducted by researchers at the Binghamton University School of Management found differences between what is called “success materialism” and “happiness materialism.” People who see materialism as a source of success tend to be more motivated to work hard and drive to succeed in order to make their lives better as opposed to people who see materialism as a source of happiness. However neither mindset accounts for other factors, such as income or status, that can affect happiness.

== See also ==
- Anti-consumerism – Sociopolitical ideology
- Moonlight clan – People who expend their entire salary before the end of each month
- Status symbol – Object that denotes one's social position
- Consumerism – Acquisition of goods beyond essential needs
- Productivism – Primacy of productivity and growth
- Capitalism – Economic system based on private ownership
- Greed – Insatiable longing for material or immaterial gain; avarice
- Culture – Social behavior and norms of a society
- Workism – Social trend
- Positional good – Goods whose value is given by desirability rather than quantity
- Post-materialism – Concept in sociology
- Material feminism – Type of feminism
- Economic inequality – Distribution of income or wealth between different groups
- Identity performance – How persons present themselves in social interactions
- Commodity fetishism – Concept in Marxist analysis
- Happiness economics – Study of happiness and quality of life
- Reduction (complexity) – Transformation of one computational problem to another
- Conspicuous consumption – Concept in sociology and economy
- Keeping up with the Joneses – Idiom on comparing oneself to neighbors
