= Bernd Schmitt =

American academic

Bernd Herbert Schmitt
- Born: October 22, 1957 (age 69); Heidelberg, Germany
- Education: University of Heidelberg; Cornell University
- Scientific career
- Fields: Marketing
- Workplaces: Columbia Business School, New York City
- Thesis: Functional orientations toward advertisements and consumer products (1988)
- Doctoral advisor: Daryl Bem
- Website: www.meetschmitt.com

Bernd Herbert Schmitt is an American marketing researcher. He is the Robert D. Calkins Professor of International Business at Columbia Business School in New York City. Schmitt works in the fields of brand management and customer experience.

== Biography ==
Schmitt was born in Heidelberg, Germany, and attended the University of Heidelberg, from which he earned a Master's degree in psychology in 1984. Four years later, he received a PhD in psychology from Cornell University. Schmitt joined Columbia University in 1988 and became professor in 1998. A year later, he founded the Center on Global Brand Leadership, serving as its first director. In 2003, he was named the Robert D. Calkins Professor of International Business.

Schmitt has been researching and teaching in Asia since the early 1990s. In 1996, he was appointed head of Marketing at the China Europe International Business School, the first marketing chair in China, a position he held until 2000. Later, in 2011, he began a two-year term in Singapore to lead the newly created Institute on Asian Consumer Insight at Nanyang Technological University.

Schmitt studies marketing, brand management, and customer experience. He has authored nine books translated into more than 30 languages, in one of these, he became the first to introduce the term "experiential marketing". , Schmitt served as the editor-in-chief of the Journal of Consumer Research.

== Publications ==
=== Books ===
- — (2014). The changing face of the Asian consumer: insights and strategies for Asian markets. McGraw-Hill Education. ISBN 978-1259071010.
- —; Van Zutphen, Glenn (2012). Happy Customers Everywhere: How Your Business Can Profit from the Insights of Positive Psychology. Palgrave Macmillan. ISBN 978-0230116450.
- — (2007). Big Think Strategy: How to Leverage Bold Ideas and Leave Small Thinking Behind. Harvard Business School Press. ISBN 978-1422103210.
- —; Mangold, Marc (2004). Kundenerlebnis als Wettbewerbsvorteil: Mit Customer Experience Management Marken und Märkte Gewinn bringend gestalten [Customer Experience as a Competitive Advantage:Designing Brands and Markets Profitably with Customer Experience Management] (in German). Springer Gabler. ISBN 978-3409127295.
- — (2003). Customer Experience Management: A Revolutionary Approach to Connecting with Your Customers. Wiley. ISBN 978-0471237747.
- —; Rogers, David L.; Vrotsos, Karen (2003). There's No Business That's Not Show Business: Marketing in an Experience Culture. FT Press. ISBN 978-0130471192.
- —; Brown, Laura (2001). Build Your Own Garage: Blueprints and Tools to Unleash Your Company's Hidden Creativity. Free Press. ISBN 978-0743202602.
- — (1999). Experiential Marketing: How to Get Customers to Sense, Feel, Think, Act, Relate. Free Press. ISBN 978-0684854236.
- —; Simonson, Alex (1997). Marketing Aesthetics: The Strategic Management of Brands, Identity and Image. Free Press. ISBN 978-0684826554.

=== Selected papers and book chapters ===
- D. Hoyer, Wayne; Kroschke, Mirja; —; Kraume, Karsten; Shankar, Venkatesh (2020). "Transforming the Customer Experience through New Technologies". Journal of Interactive Marketing. 51 (1): 57–71. doi:10.1016/j.intmar.2020.04.001.
- — (2015). "The consumer psychology of brands". Handbuch Sozialtechniken der Kommunikation: 1–13. doi:10.1007/978-3-658-05262-1_21-1.
- — (2011). "The consumer psychology of brands". Journal of Marketing Management. 22 (1): 7–17. doi:10.1016/j.jcps.2011.09.005.
- Zarantonello, Lia; — (2010). "Using the brand experience scale to profile consumers and predict consumer behaviour". Journal of Brand Management. 17 (7): 532–540. doi:10.1057/bm.2010.4.
- Brakus, J. Josko; —; Zarantonello, Lia (2009). "Brand Experience: What is It? How is it Measured? Does it Affect Loyalty?". Journal of Marketing. 73 (3): 52–68. doi:10.1509/jmkg.73.3.052.
- Esch, Franz-Rudolf; Langner, Tobias; —; Geus, Patrick (2006). "Are brands forever? How brand knowledge and relationships affect current and future purchases". Journal of Product & Brand Management. 15 (2): 98–105. doi:10.1108/10610420610658938.
- — (1999). "Experiential Marketing". Journal of Marketing Management. 15 (1–3): 53–67. doi:10.1362/026725799784870496.
- Leclerc, France; —; Dube, Laurette (1994). "Foreign Branding and Its Effects on Product Perceptions and Attitudes". Journal of Marketing Management. 31 (2): 263–270. doi:10.1177/002224379403100209.
