= Bojana Sentaler =

Serbian-Canadian fashion Designer

- Bojana Sentaler
- Born: 1984 (age 41–42); Belgrade, Serbia
- Occupation: Fashion Designer
- Known for: Luxury Outerwear
- Website: sentaler.com

Bojana Sentaler is a Canadian fashion designer, Founder, President and Creative Director of Sentaler since 2009. She is known for her line of luxury alpaca outerwear and accessories.

== Background ==
Born in Belgrade, Serbia, Sentaler emigrated to Canada when she was eight years old. She attended the Schulich School of Business at York University in Toronto and graduated with a Bachelor of Business Administration (BBA) degree in Marketing and Finance in 2006.

She began her career working for a corporate beauty brand. After a short time, she left her position to pursue being an entrepreneur. In 2008, she traveled to Dubai and began a small business creating economic investment reports on the MENA region for a UK newspaper. In 2009, she traveled to Peru where she discovered alpaca fabric and launched the Sentaler Canadian luxury outerwear brand.

When the time came to choose a career path, Sentaler chose to focus on the business for stability instead of attending a fashion school. After graduating from the Schulich School of Business, Sentaler took a position in sales and marketing with a corporate beauty brand. She found the corporate environment too restrictive for her creativity and entrepreneurial spirit. This led her to resign and travel to Dubai to explore opportunities in fashion.

In 2008, while living in Dubai, she worked on economic investment reports on emerging markets, particularly the MENA region for a UK newspaper. While interviewing various corporate CEO's and Saudi sheiks, Sentaler had the opportunity to interview Karl Lagerfeld, who had recently designed luxury villas in Dubai. After the interview, Sentaler expressed her dreams of becoming a fashion designer. Lagerfeld remarked, "You either have it or you don't, and if you have it, go for it." After discovering alpaca fabric in Peru and spending time studying its unique properties, Sentaler decided to launch a luxury outerwear brand. She designed her first seven "dream coats" and founded the SENTALER brand in 2009 in Toronto.

In 2015, her brand gained national attention when Sophie Grégoire Trudeau wore a white Sentaler coat to her husband's swearing-in ceremony. Her coats have also been worn by Meghan Markle and Kate Middleton. In 2021, she launched Sentaler Men, a menswear line.

== Awards & honours ==
- Canadian Arts and Fashion Awards (CAFA) 2022 "The Outerwear Brand of The Year" Winner: Sentaler.
- Canadian Arts and Fashion Awards (CAFA) 2019 "The Outerwear Brand of The Year" Nominee: Sentaler.
- Women in Business Award: International Women Achievers' Awards March 2014.
