= Rob McEwen =

Canadian businessman

Rob McEwen CM
- Born: April 15, 1950 (age 76)
- Education: St. Andrew's College
- Alma mater: University of Western Ontario; Schulich School of Business
- Occupation: Businessman
- Known for: Founder of Goldcorp
- Spouse: Cheryl Mason

Rob McEwen, CM (born April 15, 1950) is a Canadian businessman who is the chairman and chief executive officer of McEwen Mining. He was the founder of Goldcorp and formerly served as its chairman and chief executive officer. In January 2019, Goldcorp merged with Newmont to form Newmont Goldcorp Corporation, which subsequently became the largest gold mining company in the world.

McEwen followed his father into the investment industry and also developed a passion for gold. As of 2016, he is one of the hundred wealthiest Canadians, with an estimated personal net worth over $800 million.

McEwen devised an innovative approach to exploration when he published maps and geological data on one of Goldcorp's properties and invited scientists and engineers around the world to analyze the data and submit drilling plans to Goldcorp to help it find its next gold deposit. Normally, such data is considered proprietary and confidential in the exploration and mining industry, and some of McEwen's colleagues were horrified at the idea of publishing the company's proprietary data. Goldcorp offered prize money of $500,000 for the best drilling ideas. The response was overwhelming and more than 1400 participants submitted drilling plans to the company, leading to further gold discoveries.

A graduate of St. Andrew's College in 1969, McEwen later earned a Bachelor of Arts from the University of Western Ontario and a Master of Business Administration from the Schulich School of Business at York University. He also holds an honorary Doctor of Laws degree from York University. McEwen is a member of WPO, the Canadian Council of Chief Executives and the Dean's Advisory Board at the Schulich School of Business.

McEwen co-founded the McEwen Centre for Regenerative Medicine with his wife, Cheryl. She has served since 2005 as Vice-Chair of the Toronto General & Western Hospital Foundation board, which is part of the University Health Network. She is also the founder of Make My Day Foods Inc., manufacturer of the Veggie Puck.

In 2008, McEwen was invested into the Order of Canada, the country's highest civilian honor. McEwen was inducted into the Canadian Mining Hall of Fame in 2017.
