= William Dimma =

Canadian academic and business executive (1928–2022)

William Dimma CM OOnt
- Born: William Andrew Dimma; August 13, 1928; Montreal, Quebec, Canada
- Died: December 22, 2022 (aged 94); Toronto, Ontario Canada
- Education: University of Toronto (BAS); Schulich School of Business (MBA); Harvard Business School (DBA)
- Occupation: Business executive
- Spouse: Louise Dimma
- Children: 2
- Awards: Order of Canada; Order of Ontario

William Andrew Dimma CM OOnt (August 13, 1928 – December 22, 2022) was a Canadian businessman and corporate director.

== Early life and education ==
Born in Montreal, Quebec, Dimma received a Bachelor of Applied Science degree from the University of Toronto in 1948, a Master of Business Administration degree from York University in 1969 and a Doctor of Business Administration from Harvard University in 1973.

== Career ==
From 1974 to 1976, Dimma was a professor and dean of the Faculty of Administrative Studies at York University. He was president of Torstar Corporation and Toronto Star Newspapers Ltd. from 1976 to 1978. In 1979, he joined A.E. LePage Ltd. as president and chief executive officer. He was a member of the board of governors of York University from 1976 to 1997 and was chairman from 1992 to 1997.

In 2016, Dimma sat on the jury panel for the National Business Book Awards.

Dimma served on 90 boards of directors and was the author of Excellence in the Boardroom: Best Practices in Corporate Directorship.

== Awards and recognition ==
In 1996, he was made a Member of the Order of Canada. In 1999, he was made a Fellow of the Institute of Corporate Directors. In 2000, he was made a Member of the Order of Ontario.

== Personal life and death ==
Dimma was married and had two children. He died on December 22, 2022, at the age of 94.
