= Russell W. Belk =

American business academic

Russell W. Belk is an American business academic and a Distinguished Research Professor, as well as Kraft Foods Canada Chair in Marketing at the Schulich School of Business, York University. He is a leading authority on consumption, consumer culture, consumer behaviour, materialism, collecting, gift-giving, sharing and the digital self. In 2017, he was elected to the Royal Society of Canada.

His research involves the meanings of possessions, collecting, gift-giving, sharing and materialism and his work is often cultural, visual, qualitative, and interpretive. He is the co-founder of the Association for Consumer Research Film Festival and has over 550 publications. He is currently on the editorial boards of 20 journals and is Associate Editor of the Journal of Consumer Research. He is past president of the Association for Consumer Research and the International Association of Marketing and Development, and is a fellow in the Association for Consumer Research and the American Psychological Association. He has received the Paul D. Converse Award, two Fulbright Fellowships, Society of Marketing Advances Distinguished Marketing Scholar Award, and honorary professorships on four continents. In 2005 he received the Sheth Foundation/Journal of Consumer Research Award for Long Term Contribution to Consumer Research. Besides York, he has also taught at the University of Utah, University of Illinois, Temple University, Claremont Graduate University, and universities in Eastern and Western Europe, Asia, Africa, New Zealand, and Australia. He has won the Outstanding Reviewer Award multiple times.

Some of his notable papers include "Possessions and the Extended Self," "The Sacred and the Profane in Consumer Behavior: Theodicy on the Odyssey," "Materialism: Trait Aspects of Living in the Material World," "The Fire of Desire," "The Cult of Macintosh," "Sharing," and "Extended Self in a Digital World."

He attended the University of Minnesota for his bachelor's degree in business and PhD in marketing. Prior to joining the faculty at York University, he served as the N. Eldon Tanner Professor of Business Administration at the University of Utah from 1986 to 2006.

== Selected publications ==
- Russell W. Belk, "Collecting in a Consumer Society," Routledge, London and New York, 1995 ISBN 9780415105347
