= Dezsö J. Horváth =

Canadian businessman and educator

Dezsö Horváth in 2012

Dezsö Joseph Horváth, CM is a Canadian businessman and educator. He was the dean of York University's Schulich School of Business from 1988 until 2020, and is a director of Inscape Corporation and UBS Bank (Canada). He is a former director of numerous companies, including Samuel, Son & Co. Limited (2007–2018), Westport Innovations Inc. (2001–2016), Dofasco Inc. (1995–2006) and Credit Suisse First Boston Canada (1994–1999).

== Education ==
Horváth received a BS degree in electrical engineering in 1963 from Malmö Technical Institute in Malmö, Sweden, after which he began working as a researcher at ASEA (now ABB), a Swiss-Swedish multinational corporation headquartered in Zürich, Switzerland. He also continued his postgraduate studies at University of Umeå in Sweden, receiving an MBA in 1967, a PhD in Management in 1972, and a PhD in Policy in 1976.

== Engineering career ==
From 1963 to 1968, Horváth worked as an R&D engineer at ASEA, now known as ABB Group.

== Academia ==
After leaving ASEA to pursue a university career, Horváth worked as a sessional lecturer at University of Umeå, teaching business administration students. He received his professorship at Umeå in 1972 along with his first Doctorate in Business Administration. In 1976, his academic career at York University started when he joined the Faculty of Administrative Studies as a visiting professor. One year later, he began to work as an associate professor at the same school. He was then appointed as the dean of the Schulich School of Business in 1988.

He is a member of the International Advisory Council of the Guanghua School of Management, Peking University and a member of the Advisory Boards of the Saint Petersburg State University Graduate School of Management and Fundação Dom Cabral. Furthermore, he is a co-founder of The Czech Management Centre, Prague, The Czech Republic (1990), and of the International Management Centre, Hungary (now part of the Central European University in Budapest) (1989).

In addition to his duties as the dean, Horváth was a tenured professor at the Schulich School of Business and served as a member of the York University Senate.

He retired from deanship in June 2020 - making him the longest serving dean of a Canadian business school. Within his last year, he earned $550,465.44, which also made him the highest paid employee at York University.

== Honours ==
In 1995, Horváth received the B’nai Brith Canada Award of Merit. From 1995 to 2005 he was a Fellow of the World Economic Forum.

Since 1996, he has held the Tanna H. Schulich Chair in Strategic Management at the Schulich School of Business. In 2004 he was named "Dean of the Year" by the Academy of International Business.

In 2008, he was invested as a Member of the Order of Canada by the Governor General of Canada.

In 2012, Dr. Horváth received the Queen’s Diamond Jubilee Medal in recognition of his achievements and significant contributions to Canada.

In 2014, he was selected by the Toronto Star as one of the 180 most important people, past and present, who helped shape the City of Toronto since its founding.

In 2016, in a collaboration between the Schulich School of Business and global management consultancy McKinsey & Company, Horvath co-authored Reimaging Capitalism along with McKinsey’s global managing partner, Dominic Barton and Schulich Professor, Matthias Kipping. The book provides a range of views on building a re-imagined paradigm for responsible capitalism where long-term value creation is not supplanted by the pressures of short-term profit-taking. In addition to thought leaders from Schulich and McKinsey, book contributors include other renowned academics such as Lynn Stout and Robert Eccles and visionary Canadian and global business leaders, including Paul Polman, Ratan N. Tata, Galen G. Weston and Monique Leroux.

== Selected publications ==
- Barton, Dominic; Horváth, Dezsö; Kipping, Matthias, eds. (2016), Re-Imagining Capitalism: Building a Responsible Long-Term Model, Oxford, UK: Oxford University Press, ISBN 9780198785453
