= Gordon M. Keller =

Canadian biologist (born 1952)

Gordon Michael Keller
- Born: November 1952 (age 73); Melville, Saskatchewan, Canada
- Education: University of Alberta; University of Saskatchewan
- Known for: In vitro directed differentiation of pluripotent stem cells
- Awards: 25 Transformational Canadians; Canada Research Chair; Ogawa-Yamanaka Stem Cell Prize (2019)
- Scientific career
- Fields: Stem cell biology, Developmental biology
- Workplaces: McEwen Centre for Regenerative Medicine; University of Toronto; University Health Network; Ontario Cancer Institute University of Alberta, Ph.D.

Gordon M. Keller is a Canadian scientist recognized for his research on applying developmental biology findings to in vitro pluripotent stem cell differentiation. He is currently a Senior Scientist at the Ontario Cancer Institute, a Professor at the University of Toronto and the director of the McEwen Centre for Regenerative Medicine.

== Biography ==
Keller was born in 1952 in Melville, Saskatchewan and was raised on a farm. He completed his Bachelor of Science at the University of Saskatchewan. He completed his PhD in Immunology at the University of Alberta in 1979, and completed his postdoctoral fellowship with the Ontario Cancer Institute in 1983. He then began his career in Switzerland and Austria. In 1990, he moved to the United States. Initially, Keller was at the National Jewish Centre for Immunology and Respiratory Medicine in Denver, CO and later moved to the Mount Sinai School of Medicine in New York City, NY. In 2007, Keller returned to Canada to assume his current role and established his laboratory at the MaRS Centre/Toronto Medical Discovery Tower. In 2016, Keller co-founded Toronto-based BlueRock Therapeutics with Lorenz Studer for the development of iPSC-derived cells for clinical transplantation.

== Scientific research ==
Embryonic stem cell derived cardiomyocytes published by the Keller group in FASEB 2010

In 1997, Keller's team was the first to successfully isolate the developmentally significant hemangioblast—a multipotent precursor cell that can differentiate to the hematopoietic and endothelial cell fates—using embryonic stem cell technology.

The Keller group's research includes the differentiation of pluripotent stem cells to the endodermal lineage: hepatocytes, cholangiocytes and pancreatic progenitors; as well as to mesodermal cell fates: cardiomyocytes, chondrocytes, T lymphocytes and myeloid precursors.

== Honours ==
Keller holds a Tier I Canada Research Chair in Embryonic Stem Cell Biology (2013-2020). He serves on the Scientific Advisory Boards of the Centre for Commercialization of Regenerative Medicine and Stemgent, and is also a founding member and past president (2005-2006) of the International Society for Stem Cell Research. In addition, he is a senior editor for the journal Development. In 2025, Keller won the ISSCR achievement award for his work in "laying the foundations for all modern directed differentiation approaches".
