= Ellen Auster =

Canadian professor and author

Ellen R. Auster is a Professor of Strategic Management at the Schulich School of Business at York University in Ontario, Canada. She is also the Executive Director of York Change Leadership at York University and the co-founder of Stragility Change Management.

== Education ==
Auster received a B.A. from Colgate University and a PhD from Cornell University.

== Career ==
Auster is currently a Professor of Strategic Management at the Schulich School of Business, York University and the Executive Director of York Change Leadership at York University. At Schulich, Auster was the Founding Director of the Schulich Centre for Teaching Excellence. Auster also co-founded Stragility Change Management with Lisa Hillenbrand. Prior to joining York University, Auster was faculty at Columbia Business School and the Tuck School of Business.

Auster is the author of four books and has been published in numerous academic journals.

== Personal life ==
In 1989, Auster married business school professor Stephen E. Weiss. At the time, Weiss was at the New York University Stern School of Business.

== Published books ==
- Excellence in Business Teaching: A Quick Start Guide (McGraw-Hill Ryerson, 2004) - with Tina Grant and Krista Wylie
- Strategic Organizational Change (Palgrave Macmillan, 2005) - with Krista Wylie and Michaela Valente
- Bridging the Values Gap: How Authentic Organizations Bring Values to Life (Berrett-Koehler, 2015) - with R. Edward Freeman
- Stragility: Excelling at Strategic Changes (University of Toronto Press, 2016) - with Lisa Hillenbrand
