= McEwen Centre for Regenerative Medicine =

Canadian research institute

Coordinates: 43°39′35″N 79°23′20″W

The McEwen Centre for Regenerative Medicine was established at University Health Network in Toronto in 2003, with a donation from Rob and Cheryl McEwen, which they matched in 2006 with a second donation.

The team of McEwen Investigators is working together to accelerate the development of more effective treatments for conditions such as heart disease, diabetes mellitus, respiratory disease and spinal cord injury. The McEwen Centre is based in the heart of Toronto's Discovery District at the MaRS Centre/Toronto Medical Discovery Tower.

The current Director of the McEwen Center for Regenerative Medicine is Prof. Gordon Keller, Canada Research Chair in Embryonic Stem Cell Biology.
