= Konrad Schily =

German physician & politician (born 1937)

Konrad Schily (born 7 November 1937 in Bochum) was from 2005 to 2009 a member of the German parliament, the Bundestag. He is a neurologist and co-founder of the Witten/Herdecke University, Germany's first private university that opened in 1982. He was the university's president from 1982 to 1999 and from 2002 to 2004.

Schily was a member of the Social Democratic Party of Germany (SPD), but in 2003 he became a member of the Innovationskreis NRW liberal, a think tank of the centrist party Free Democratic Party (FDP). In 2005 Schily became a member of the FDP. He was elected to the Bundestag the same year.

== Family ==
Konrad Schily is the youngest of five children. He is married and has four children. His brother is Otto Schily, the former German Minister of the Interior.
