= Boris Zernikow =

German pediatrician

- Born: August 12, 1964 (age 62); Bochum
- Education: Westphalian Wilhelms-University; Harvard Medical School
- Scientific career
- Fields: Paediatrician
- Workplaces: Witten/Herdecke University

Boris Zernikow (born August 12, 1964 in Bochum) is a German paediatrician who works in the field of pain therapy and palliative medicine. He holds the chair for child pain therapy and pediatric palliative medicine at the Witten/Herdecke University as well as chief physician at the Vestische Kinder- und Jugendklinik Datteln.

== Career ==
Zernikow studied human medicine at the Westphalian Wilhelms-University of Münster from 1986 until 1993 during which he was supported by a scholarship from the Cusanuswerk. He completed the practical year of his training at St. Gallen cantonal hospital, Switzerland, and Harvard Medical School, USA.

After the completion of his medical degree, Zernikow trained as specialist in children's and youth medicine with a focus on pediatric oncology, completing additional qualifications in Pediatric Pain Therapy and Palliative Medicine. In 2004 he habilitated on the subject of “Pain Therapy in Paediatric Oncology – Results of a nation-wide quality improvement program (STOP)”.

In 2002, a team led by Zernikow established the Vodafone Foundation Institute (VIKP) in Datteln at the Children and Adolescent's Hospital. This developed into the German Paediatric Pain Centre (2008) and the Centre of Paediatric Palliative Care (2010). Zernikow has held the chair for Children's Pain Therapy and Paediatric Palliative Care at the Witten/Herdecke University from 2004 and has been chief physician at the Children's Hospital Datteln since 2002.

== Work ==
The German Paediatric Pain Centre (Deutsches Kinderschmerzzentrum), with 30 in-patient beds, and adjoining outpatient treatment centre, is one of the largest institutions internationally for the treatment and research of chronic pain in childhood and adolescence. Here, Zernikow has been involved in the development of the multimodal therapy program to treat chronic pain and has co-authored a manual on this topic. The treatment program is distinguished in particular by its short duration but high intensity form. Research supports the efficacy of the program with benefits maintained long term.

In June 2010, the Centre of Paediatric Palliative Care including the eight-bed in-hospital paediatric palliative care unit and a homecare PPC-team was opened at the Children's Hospital Datteln under the ongoing medical management of Zernikow. The Centre of Paediatric Palliative Care has the goal of relieving painful disease symptoms and producing the highest possible degree of quality of life for children and adolescents with palliative diseases in cooperation with the whole family.

=== Research ===
Zernikow has published more than 140 scientific articles in peer-reviewed scientific journals on the topics of pain therapy and palliative care in children and adolescents in the fields of diagnostic, therapeutic and healthcare research. Additionally, Zernikow has contributed to the following textbooks:

- As editor and co-author: Schmerztherapie für Kinder, Jugendliche und junge Erwachsene (Pain therapy for children, adolescents and young adults). 5th edition. Springer Medizin Verlag: Heidelberg 2015.
- As editor and co-author: Palliativversorgung von Kindern, Jugendlichen und jungen Erwachsenen (Palliative care for children, adolescents and young adults). 2nd edition. Springer Medizin Verlag: Heidelberg 2013.
- As editor and co-author: Practical Treatment Options for Chronic Pain in Children and Adolescents. An Interdisciplinary Therapy Manual, Springer: Berlin, Heidelberg 2019.

== Distinctions and prizes ==
- 2004: Award Interdisciplinarity in medicine 2004; German Society for interdisciplinary clinical medicine (Deutsche Gesellschaft für Interdisziplinäre Klinische Medizin (DGIKM))
- 2005: Clinic Sponsoring Prize 2005, awarded by the Bayrische Landesbank
- 2006: Award for pain research 2006 of the German Society for the Study of Pain (category „clinical research“) (Deutsche Gesellschaft zum Studium des Schmerzes)
- 2007: Sertürner Prize 2007 of the Sertürner Society Einbeck e.V. (Sertürner Gesellschaft Einbeck e.V.)
- 2008: Award Leben pur 2008 of the Foundation “Leben pur”
- 2008, 2009, 2012 and 2013: Award for palliative medicine of the German Society of Palliative medicine (Deutsche Gesellschaft für Palliativmedizin)
- 2011: Selected Landmark in the Land of Ideas 2011: Paediatric outpatient clinic
- 2015: Communicator Award - Science Award of the Donors' Association and the German Research Foundation (DFG)
- 2016: "dfg-Award" – winner in the category "outstanding communication and marketing" (in the health care system)
- 2016: Fast Forward Science competition, 1st place in the category "Substance" with the German educational movie: Migräne? Hab ich im Griff! (Migraine: How it works and how to get it under control!)
