= W. David Wilson =

Canadian businessman

- Born: 6 February 1945 (age 81); Toronto, Ontario
- Education: University of Toronto (BComm); York University (MBA)
- Spouse: Shelagh Higgins (m. 1969)

William David Wilson (born 6 February 1945) is a Canadian financial executive and administrator who was the Chair of the Ontario Securities Commission between November 1, 2005 and October 31, 2010. He obtained an MBA from Schulich School of Business in 1970.

Wilson spent most of his career in the financial services industry. He was employed by the Toronto-Dominion Bank, Dominion Securities Corporation and the Bank of Nova Scotia. He held the position of vice-chair, responsible for overseeing and leading the global wholesale activities at Scotiabank until 2005. In 2005, Wilson was appointed by the Government of Ontario as chair and CEO of its crown agency, the Ontario Securities Commission.

Wilson has been involved in a number of corporate boards and community organizations. He was a director of Rogers Communications. for 26 years. He has been a director or trustee of the following not-for-profit entities: The United Way of Greater Toronto, the National Ballet of Canada, the Art Gallery of Ontario. Wilson was a member of the Governing Council of the University of Toronto for nine years during which period he chaired the University of Toronto's Presidential Search Committee and the university's Business Board.
