= Sheelagh Whittaker =

Canadian business executive and author (born 1947)

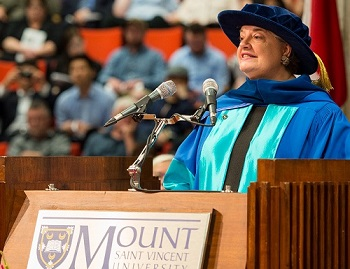
- Born: 9 April 1947 (age 79)
- Education: Schulich School of Business
- Occupations: Businesswoman and author
- Years active: 1970–present
- Spouse(s): Bill Morgan (producer) (m. 1990; died 2020)

Sheelagh Whittaker (born 9 April 1947) is a Canadian business executive and author. Whittaker was the first female CEO of a TSX listed company and during her career held senior positions at Electronic Data Systems, Royal Bank of Canada, CanWest Global Communications Corporation and Standard Life. She has regularly spoken on feminist issues.

== Early life ==
Whittaker was born in Ottawa and raised in Alberta, Canada.

== Career ==
Whittaker began her career as a federal anti-trust officer and gained her MBA at York's Schulich School of Business. She spent much of her early career working for The Canada Consulting Group, now Boston Consulting Group, as a director and then partner. Following this, Whittaker became vice president of planning and corporate affairs at the Canadian Broadcasting Corporation. While at the CBC, Whittaker helped to secure the CRTC licence to operate CBC Newsworld. She then became the president and CEO of Canadian Satellite Communications, better known as Cancom and now a part of Shaw Broadcast Services. In doing so, Whittaker became the first female CEO of a TSX listed company.

In 1993, Whittaker joined Electronic Data Systems (EDS) based in Plano, Texas (now a part of Hewlett Packard Enterprise), at that time one of the leading providers of information technology services. Serving first as the president and CEO of EDS Canada, Whittaker went on to become the executive vice-president in Asia Pacific in 2001, before transferring to London where she served as the managing director, United Kingdom, Africa and Middle East until her retirement in 2005.

Whittaker has sat as a non-executive director on several corporate boards including the Royal Bank of Canada, CanWest Global Communications Corporation and insurance company Standard Life. She is also one of the longest serving independent directors of Imperial Oil, the Canadian subsidiary of ExxonMobil. As a result, Whittaker has been featured on the front of The New York Times as having broken the glass ceiling and been labelled ‘The Pioneer’ by The Globe and Mail in their ‘Women in Power’ series.

== Executive appointments ==
While serving at both Cancom and Electronic Data Systems, Whittaker was appointed to several non-executive roles in North America and the UK. In 1993, Whittaker was asked to join the board of the Royal Bank of Canada, by then chairman and CEO, Allan R. Taylor. She then became an independent director of Imperial Oil in 1996. During her tenure at Imperial Oil Whittaker has chaired the corporate governance and nominations committee, working with and reporting to Rex Tillerson, who headed up the Imperial Oil's US parent company ExxonMobil until his appointment as US Secretary of State by President Trump in 2017. She worked as an independent trustee of CanWest Mediaworks Income Fund as well as later serving as both a director for CanWest Mediaworks in Canada and a general partner of the CanWest Mediaworks Income Fund.

Following her move to the United Kingdom and subsequent retirement from EDS in 2005, Whittaker was appointed to the board of the insurance company Standard Life in September 2009. She served on the board for four years, before retiring in 2013, moving from the parent company to join the board of Standard Life Canada with Chairman David Nish announcing Whittaker would assist the company's ‘implementation of their strategy in the evolving Canadian market environment’. During her career, Ms. Whittaker has served as a corporate director on three different continents.

== Feminism and the advocacy of Women’s Rights ==
Whittaker has been featured in the Women of Influence lecture series and is a member of Maclean's Magazine’s Honour Roll. Mount Saint Vincent University described her as ‘an accomplished Canadian businesswoman with a history of breaking glass ceilings’. Peter C. Newman, the author of Here Be Dragons: Telling Tales of People, Passion and Power, described Whittaker as a part of a generation of powerful women who were taking up senior executive roles in Canada. Along with Diane McGarry, CEO of Xerox in Canada and Maureen Kempston Darkes, President of General Motors Canada, Whittaker was thought to have been among the first women to cross gender lines and gain power and wealth in an increasingly meritocratic society in Canada.

Whittaker has often described how she attempted to make the corporate world work for her. She reportedly used to pretend to be her own secretary to better screen calls and breastfed her youngest son in the boardroom of RBC. Whittaker felt anecdotes of this kind should serve as inspiration to other women who wished to reach senior executive heights; “There is a point in women’s lives when they see others going to the top and they ask themselves why not me? I can do this too.”

A self-described feminist, Whittaker has advocated for the promotion of female executives. She has said, “We’ll have true equality when we have as many incompetent women in positions of power as we have incompetent men”. She has argued for quotas for executive positions and boards. However, her views have often been met by opposition. Whittaker views herself as a part of a generation who have sought to “stamp out personal and corporate complacency” in the board room.

For her advocacy of gender equality in the workplace and for her business career, Whittaker has received several honorary degrees, including one from Mount Saint Vincent University in 2016 and one from Cape Breton University in 2001. She also received the Outstanding Executive Leadership Award from York University in 1992, the same year she was chosen as “Woman of the Year” by Canadian Women.

== Publications ==
Whittaker has published two books. The first, The Slaidburn Angel was published in 2012 by Dundurn Press. Her second book, Evaline: A Feminist’s Tale was published by Departure Bay in 2016.

The Slaidburn Angel tells the true-crime story of a murder in Whittaker's own family, the infanticide of Thomas Gardner in May 1885. The murder occurred near a village in the north of England called Slaidburn. The boy's mother, Grace Gardner, and her sister Isabella was put on trial for the murder of the child as the only suspects in the crime. Grace Gardner's stepdaughter was Margaret Isherwood, Whittaker's grandmother, who was a key witness in the trial. Her second book, Evaline: A Feminist’s Tale, is a chronicle of the impact of the sixties Women's liberation movement on the life and career of a fictional woman called Evaline Sadlier.
