= Carol Anne Letheren =

Secretary General of the Canadian Olympic Association
- In office 1994–2001

Personal details
- Born: Carol Anne Wood; July 27, 1942 Owen Sound, Ontario
- Died: February 2, 2001 (aged 58) Toronto, Ontario
- Cause of death: brain aneurysm
- Education: University of Toronto; Schulich School of Business, York University

Carol Anne Letheren née Wood (July 27, 1942 — February 2, 2001) was the secretary general of the Canadian Olympic Association and a member of the International Olympic Committee. Letheren was awarded the Canadian Olympic Order in 2001 and inducted into the Canadian Olympic Hall of Fame in 2010 posthumously.

== Early life and education ==
Letheren was born on July 27, 1942, in Owen Sound, Ontario, and spent her childhood in Guelph. She graduated from the University of Toronto with a bachelor's degree in physical education and a Master of Business Administration from York University.

== Career ==
Letheren began her sports career as an archery coach for the University of Toronto in 1963. She coached for the university until 1970 when she continued her teaching at York University. Letheren remained at York until 1977. During her time at York, Letheren was the vice president of the Canadian Gymnastics Federation.

In sports competitions, Letheren was a judge at the Olympic Games and the Pan American Games throughout the mid 1970s to late 1980s. Apart from judging, Letheren continued her Olympic work by joining the Canadian Olympic Association in 1981 and was the head of mission of the Canadian team at the 1988 Summer Olympics. For the COA, she held multiple positions for the committee including president and secretary general in 1994. In 1990, Letheren became a member of the International Olympic Committee. With the IOC, Letheren was a coordinator of the Salt Lake Organizing Committee that was in charge of the 2002 Winter Olympics.

== Death ==
On the evening January 31, 2001, Letheren was giving a speech at a Schulich alumni banquet when she collapsed. Two days later, Letheren died from a brain aneurysm on February 2, 2001, in Toronto, Ontario. Prime Minister Jean Chretien said, "Her loss is a blow to the Canadian Olympic movement that will be felt for years to come".

== Personal life ==
Letheren was married and had one child.

== Awards and honours ==
In 2001, Letheren was awarded the Canadian Olympic Order and posthumously inducted into the Canadian Olympic Hall of Fame in 2010. She was also posthumously named into the Guelph Sports Hall of Fame in 2003.
