= Stephen E. Weiss =

Business academic

Stephen E. Weiss is an associate professor of policy and international business at the Schulich School of Business, York University (from 2012 to 2015, he was the academic director for their MBA program) and a consultant and coach at Weiss Negotiations.

== Education ==
- International relations and conflict analysis, Ph.D., University of Pennsylvania.

== Personal life ==
In 1989, he married Ellen Auster, when he was a professor at the New York University Stern School of Business.
