= Cheryl McEwen =

Canadian philanthropist and entrepreneur

Cheryl A. McEwen (née Mason) is a Toronto philanthropist and entrepreneur who, in 2014, founded Make My Day Foods Inc., manufacturer of the Veggie Puck.

In 1991, McEwen, with her brother, Darren Mason, and sister, Beverley Lerner, co-founded upscale Andrews Department Store in Toronto, which her siblings– both high-profile retail business leaders –expanded and continue to own and operate under Darren Mason & Associates Ltd.

Darren launched the "Eyes on the Road" campaign in 2016, at St. Andrew's College, the alma mater he shares with his sister's spouse, mining magnate Rob McEwen.

Cheryl has served as vice-chair of the Toronto General & Western Hospital Foundation Board since 2005, which is part of the University Health Network.

The McEwens co-founded the McEwen Centre for Regenerative Medicine. In 2013, the couple were each awarded the Queen Elizabeth II Diamond Jubilee Medal for contributions in the advancement of stem cell research.
