= ECN Capital =

Canadian fintech company

ECN Capital Corporation
- Type: Public
- Traded as: TSX: ECN; S&P/TSX Composite Component
- Industry: Business Services
- Founded: 2016
- Headquarters: Toronto, Ontario, Canada
- Key people: Steven K. Hudson (Chief executive officer)
- Website: http://ecncapitalcorp.com/

ECN Capital Corporation is a Canadian financing company with managed and advised assets of approximately US$29 billion. It provides credit portfolios to 90 U.S. financial institutions and also originates, manages and advises on prime credit assets. It is listed on the Toronto Stock Exchange.

== History ==
ECN was founded in October 2016, through a spin-off of Element Financial's equipment finance division. The spin-off resulted in two separate publicly traded companies: Element Fleet Management, which manages vehicle fleets, and ECN Capital, which provided commercial financing, especially to fleet owners.

In February 2017, ECN sold its US commercial and vendor finance business to PNC Capital for $1.25 billion. The deal caused the company's share price to rise, in part because the sale price was above book value. This deal was part of a larger attempted re-deployment of capital by ECN from vendor and equipment financing to home improvement and construction financing. As part of this re-deployment, in June 2017, the firm purchased Service Finance, an American home improvement lender, for $410 million. It also purchased Triad Financial, a Florida-based home improvement lender, for $100 million, in October 2017. On the other hand, in August 2017, ECN sold some of its rail car financing business for $1.44 billion. It also sold its Canadian vendor financing business for $900 million in October 2017. In December 2021 ECN sold Service Financial for US$2 Billion and used the proceeds to declare a $7.50/share special dividend that was paid out to shareholders on Dec. 22, 2021.

== Business ==
ECN Capital currently operates in two divisions:

- Triad Financial, a manufactured home lender
- The Kessler Group, a payment services company
