= Witten/Herdecke University =

Private university in Germany

- Universität Witten-Herdecke
- Motto: Zur Freiheit ermutigen – nach Wahrheit streben – soziale Verantwortung fördern
- Motto in English: Encourage freedom – Strive for truth – Assume social responsibility
- Type: Private, state-recognized, non-profit
- Established: 1982; 44 years ago
- Affiliations: German Rectors' Conference
- Endowment: approx. €38 million
- President: Martin Butzlaff
- Vice-president: Jan Peter Nonnenkamp
- Administrative staff: 554
- Students: 2532
- Location: Alfred-Herrhausen-Straße 50, 58448 Witten, North Rhine-Westphalia, Germany; 51°27′08″N 7°21′25″E
- Website: www.uni-wh.de

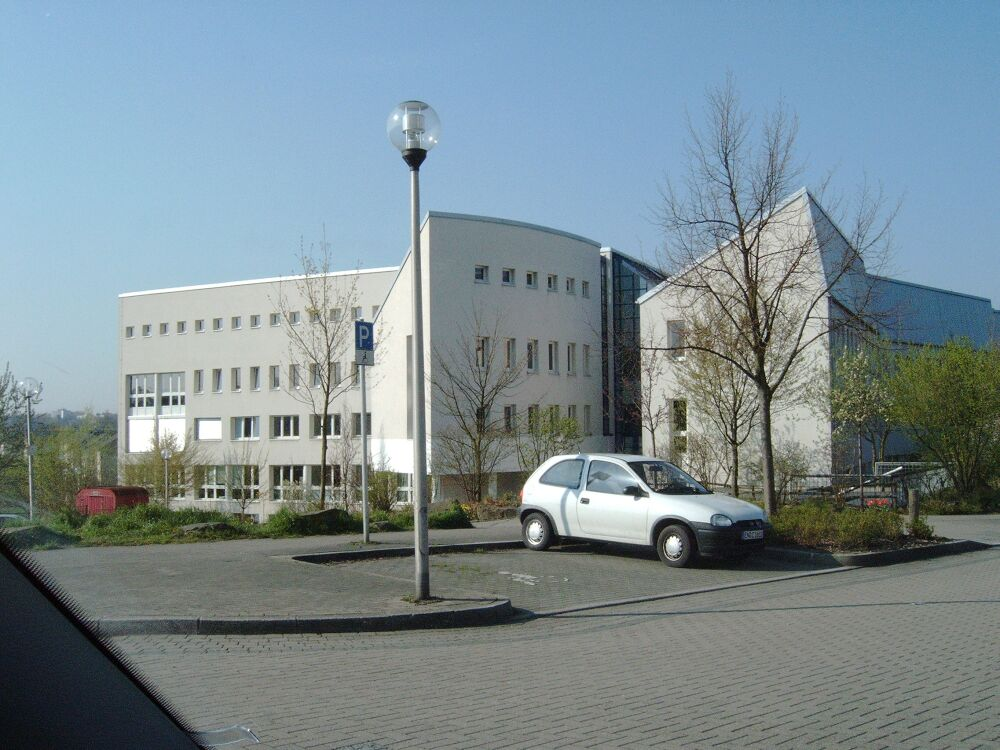
Main building of the Universität Witten/Herdecke

Witten/Herdecke University is a private, state-recognized, nonprofit university in Witten, North Rhine-Westphalia, Germany. It was the first German private institution of higher education to receive accreditation as a "Universität", a status recognizing the university's academic quality equivalent to state-run universities and granting the right to award bachelor's and master's degrees, doctorates, and the German Habilitation.

In 2019, about 2,500 students are enrolled at the Witten/Herdecke University, with a staff of 582, including faculty of 71 professors and 232 lecturers/researchers. About 100 PhD candidates receive a PhD degree each year from the graduate school. There are also more master's students than bachelor's students, showing the university's strength in graduate education. The university is currently enlarging its campus and increasing the number of students.

== History ==
1982: Recognition by the Federal Government as Germany's first private university. Early supporters of the university include Alfred Herrhausen, Gerd Bucerius, Reinhard Mohn and the Bertelsmann Foundation.

1984: The degree programmes in economics and dental medicine are established

1990: The German Council of Science and Humanities reviews the university and grants it public funding support for buildings.

1993: The Institute of Fundamental Studies receives Faculty status. It will become a core element of the Witten/Herdecke identity as every student regardless of his subject has to take courses offered by the faculty, thereby gaining interdisciplinary skills and reflexive capacities.

1995: Students of the university found the StudierendenGesellschaft Witten/Herdecke, a student association which introduces and until today operates an innovative inverted generational-contract payment model for student fees. The model avoids social selection in the admission process by enabling students to repay their tuition according to their own financial capacities after they have embarked on their professional careers.

1996: The status of Witten/Herdecke University as a model university is underlined by a second review through the German Council of Science and Humanities. The state government follows recommendations to subsidize Witten/Herdecke University with public funds and the university establishes a degree programme in Nursing Science, the first of its kind in Germany.

2001: The Witten/Herdecke University is accepted as a member of the German Rectors' Conference.

2005: The university converts all of its diploma programmes to bachelor/master programmes, accredited by the summer term of 2005.

2006: The university is urged to undergo a notable expansion of research and teaching at the Faculty of Medicine. In July 2006 the German Council of Science and Humanities approves the revised concept of the medical curriculum.

2007–2009: Witten/Herdecke hosts the Witten Lectures in Economics and Philosophy, with the purpose of "fostering philosophical reflection upon and proposing solutions to major economic and political issues". The series brings laureates of the Nobel Memorial Prize in Economic Sciences such as Kenneth Arrow, Thomas Schelling, and George Akerlof to Germany's first private university.

2008: The university undergoes its most severe crisis since its foundation. Internal problems, the general economic crisis, loss of major sponsors and withdrawal of public funds culminate in a threat of insolvency. In December 2009 the State Ministry of Innovation, Science, Research and Technology announces its intention to withdraw funding. Students and professors of the university protest outside the state parliament in Düsseldorf.

2009: Major internal restructuring efforts and a new shareholder agreement with new partners secure the financial stability of the university and its academic development.

2010: Implementation of new degree programmes: The interdisciplinary Bachelor programme "Philosophy, Politics and Economics (B.A.)" and the Master programme "Family Business Management (M.Sc.)".

2011: The German Council of Science and Humanities reaccredits Witten/Herdecke University for a further 7-year period in response to extensive revisions since 2005/06.

2021: The new building and extension of the university was inaugurated on 1 October 2021. The current President of the European Commission, Ursula von der Leyen, gave a speech on site as a prominent guest of honour.

2024: Witten/Herdecke University is accredited by the German Council of Science and Humanities for the maximum possible period of 10-years. The very positive assessment emphasises, among other things, that the university has repeatedly succeeded in introducing innovative elements into the design of studies and teaching since its foundation, which have often served as models for other universities. Both the interdisciplinary study model of ‘’Witten Didactics‘’ and the concept of the obligatory Studium fundamentale can still be regarded as characteristics of the university. Furthermore, the council recognises that the university succeeds in encouraging a high level of student participation in university development and quality assurance processes and projects.

== Colleges and degree programmes ==
All colleges and schools offer doctorate programmes.

- College of Health
- Business School (also called "College of Management and Economics")
- College of Humanities and Arts
- Studium fundamentale

== Medical school ==
The department of medicine is the largest department in the university. It was among the first in Germany to offer an integrated and reformed medical school curriculum. The curriculum emphasizes problem-based learning and extensive clinical rotations.

Unlike most other German medical schools, admission to the Witten/Herdecke University is based on a holistic, two-step process. Every semester 42 of about 1,400 applicants (acceptance rate of 3%) are accepted to the medical school.

== Rankings ==
The university ranks very highly in national rankings, such as the CHE University Ranking, the so-called "most comprehensive ranking" for German universities. The Medical School and the Business School are ranked among the top 10 in Germany.

In 2013 and 2019, Witten/Herdecke University (UW/H) received the award for the best medical degree programme in Germany from the German Medical Association for the second time. No awards were presented between 2013 and 2019. The Hartmannbund, the German Medical Association, honours the best medical degree programmes in Germany at irregular intervals.

In 2023, the university was ranked 1st and in 2024 2nd in StudyCheck's ranking of the most popular universities with under 5,000 students. In the 2023 CHE University Ranking the Management (B. Sc.) and Philosophy, Politics and Economics (B. A.) degree programmes are in the top group in all fourteen categories of the ranking.

== Notable people ==
=== Alumni ===
- Andreas Suchanek – German economist and business ethicist and one of the best-known students of Karl Homann
- Birgitta Wolff – German economist, former president of the Goethe University Frankfurt and politician of the Christian Democratic Union (CDU)
- Brigitte Mohn – German businesswoman and a member of the Mohn family that has a significant influence on Bertelsmann group and the Bertelsmann Stiftung
- Christoph Meineke – youngest full-time mayor elected in Germany
- Christoph Vogelsang – German professional poker player
- Janosch Dahmen – member of the German parliament, the Bundestag
- Markus Giesler – consumer sociologist and Professor of Marketing at the Schulich School of Business at York University
- Klaus Welle – German politician and former Secretary General of the European Parliament
- Otto Scharmer – senior lecturer at the Massachusetts Institute of Technology (MIT) and co-founder of the Presencing Institute and its u-school for Transformation
- Wolfgang Schad – founder of the Institute for Evolutionary biology

=== Faculty ===
- Boris Zernikow (born 1964), chair for child pain therapy and pediatric palliative medicine at the Witten/Herdecke University
- Johan Galtung – Norwegian sociologist and the principal founder of the discipline of peace and conflict studies
- Karl Homann – philosopher, economist, and founder of the institutional economics approach to business ethics
- Konrad Schily – neurologist, former member of the German parliament, the Bundestag and co-founder of the Witten/Herdecke University
- Thomas Mayer – German economist and former chief economist of Deutsche Bank
- Reinhard Loske – German sustainability researcher, former member of the German Bundestag, as well as former researcher at the Wuppertal Institute and the IPCC
