= York Entrepreneurship Development Institute =

York Entrepreneurship Development Institute (YEDI)
- Industry: Startup accelerator, education
- Founded: 2013; 13 years ago
- Founder: Marat Ressin
- Headquarters: Toronto, Ontario, Canada
- Number of locations: 4 locations (2019)
- Key people: Marat Ressin, Oleg Amurjuev, Ric Phillips, Maria Konikov
- Revenue: 518,615 Canadian dollar (2016)
- Total assets: 229,523 Canadian dollar (2016)
- Number of employees: 5 (2016)
- Website: yedi.ca

York Entrepreneurship Development Institute (YEDI) is a venture fund, startup accelerator, incubator and entrepreneurial community located within York University in Toronto, Ontario, Canada. YEDI facilitates collaboration between students, alumni, and academic and business leaders. The organization was founded in 2013 by businessman Dr. Marat Ressin, a native of Russia with close ties to the Jewish community in Canada.

== Overview ==
York Entrepreneurship Development Institute is a sector-agnostic start-up supporting organization that provides mentorship to entrepreneurs and not-for-profit organizations. Upon graduation, the entrepreneurs receive formal certification from The Schulich School of Business (York University) and YEDI. The accelerator programs also assist high potential start-ups with securing funding.

YEDI holds events aimed at creating connections between members from different industry sectors. Start-ups and entrepreneurs use the YEDI spaces during their start-up programs to make prototypes and have a co-working space located within facilities of York University and YEDI's partners.

== Partnerships and events ==
YEDI is a general partner of Canadian Venture Capital and Private Equity Association. In March 2016, YEDI partnered with Israeli Ariel University to share its methodology with students through an intensive two-week business acceleration program that was launched for the first time on August 7, 2016. In 2018, Plekhanov Russian University of Economics opened the Joint Department of International Finance and Economics of Small Business Development with YEDI. In 2020, YEDI brought its International Program to Kazakhstan in partnership with Suleyman Demirel University.
