= Journal of Consumer Research =

- Discipline: Consumer Behaviour
- Language: English
- Edited by: Bernd Schmitt, June Cotte, Markus Giesler, Andrew T. Stephen, Stacy Wood

Publication details
- History: 1974-present
- Publisher: Oxford University Press
- Frequency: Bimonthly
- Impact factor: 3.800 (2016)

Standard abbreviations
- ISO 4: J. Consum. Res.

Indexing
- ISSN: 0093-5301 (print); 1537-5277 (web)
- JSTOR: jconsrese
- OCLC no.: 985356409

Links
- Journal homepage; Online access; Online archive

The Journal of Consumer Research is a bimonthly peer-reviewed academic journal covering research on the psychological aspects of consumer behavior. It was established in 1974 and originally published by University of Chicago Press. Since 2015 it has been published by Oxford University Press. According to the Journal Citation Reports, the journal has a 2016 impact factor of 3.800, ranking it 19th out of 121 journals in the category "Business."
