= Synchronization model =

In configuration management (CM), one has to control (among other things) changes made to software and documentation. This is called revision control, which manages multiple versions of the same unit of information. Although revision control is important to CM, it is not equal to it.

Synchronization Models, also known as Configuration Management Models (Feiler, 1991), describe methods to enable revision control through allowing simultaneous, concurrent changes to individual files.

== Synchronization models ==
Feiler (1991) reports on four different synchronization models, shortly described below.

=== Check-out/check-in ===
In the check-out/check-in model, files are stored individually in a repository from which they are checked out whenever the files are accessed, and checked in when they have changed. This repository can store multiple versions of the files. Because these files can be documentation or source code, but can also be a collection of files, the term Configuration item (CI) will be used from now on. The basic mechanism used to prevent conflicts by simultaneous modifications is that of locking.

=== Composition ===
The composition model is an extension on the check-out/check-in model. This model allows developers to think in configurations instead of individual files. Although the complete check-out/check-in model is represented in the composition model, it enables the use of different strategies for updating through the use of improved support for the management of configurations. A configuration is defined as being built up from a system model and version selection rules. The system model determines which files are used, while the version selection rules determine which version of the files (e.g. the latest versions or of a certain development state).

=== Long transactions ===
The long transactions model takes a broader approach by assuming that a system is built up out of logical changes. Its focus is on the coordination and integration of these changes. Basically, it uses versions of configurations and versions of files. A configuration is created based on a change request which is stored separately. Files in this configuration can be synchronized using the check-out/check-in model. When the change is completed, the complete configuration is stored back into the repository and integrated with other changes.

=== Change set ===
The change set model also works based on change requests and has a lot in common with the long transactions model. However, it starts with a certain configuration as the basis for changes. This is then changed according to the independent change requests that come in. New configurations of the product are then created by applying sets of the independently stored changes on the baseline version.

This entry covers the check-out/check-in synchronization model, including a meta-model (a process-data diagram). Because the check-out/check-in model is also included as a part of the other models discussed above, it is therefore further elaborated upon. Issues that are not discussed in detail are the three remaining synchronization models and the actual editing of CIs together with the methods related to this.

== Vocabulary ==
Concept	Definition
Version	A version is a state of an object or concept that varies from its previous state or condition.
Configuration item	An element of software or a document placed under version control. A group of CIs can also be defined as a CI (Crnkovic et al., 2003).
Configuration item history	A concept to facilitate version stamping. Splits version specific attributes from attributes common to all versions (Van de Weerd, 2005)
Document	Many types of documentation are part of software engineering. Consider documents that describe the software architecture, technical documentation, user manuals, etc.
Source code file	A source code file contains any series of statements written in some human-readable computer programming language. A computer program's source code is the collection of files that can be converted from human-readable form to an equivalent computer-executable form.
Repository	A repository is also called a vault. A repository contains only one complete version of a configuration item. Differences between versions are usually stored using a delta algorithm (Crnkovic, Asklund & Persson-Dahlqvist, 2003).
Versioning organization	Versions of a CI may be organized in a number of different ways. This is the parent for the concepts that describe the organization of versions (Crnkovic et al., 2003).
Branch	Versions organized as parallel development lines (Crnkovic et al., 2003).
Revision	Versions organized in a sequence (Crnkovic et al., 2003).
Development state	Expresses how the development of a piece of software has progressed and how much further development it may require. Each major version of a product usually goes through a stage when new features are added (alpha stage / state), then a stage when it is actively debugged (beta stage / state), and finally a stage when all important bugs have been removed (stable stage / state).

== Elaboration on check-out/check-in model ==
This section contains an elaboration on the check-out/check-in synchronization model.

=== Process-data diagram ===

The process-data diagram above describes the different concepts that are applicable in the check-out/check-in synchronization model and their relation to the activities that take place. Central to the meta-data model (right side of the figure) is the Configuration Item. This is stored in one or more repositories and can for example be a source code file or a collection of other CIs. The repository can contain multiple branches and revisions of files. These in turn consist of configuration items.

The meta-process model (left side of the figure) describes the process of the check-out and check-in activities. The activities are explained in the table of activities below.

Activity	Sub-activity	Definition
Check-Out		Files are not read or changed directly from the repository. Checking out describes these activities.
	Copy CI	A particular version of a CI is copied from the repository.
	Lock CI	If write access is required and if the CI is not already locked by someone else, the CI is locked. Otherwise the CI cannot be written back to the repository (read-only access).
Modify CI		The person editing the CI makes changes to it. This is out of the scope of the current meta-model regarding version management.
Check-In		The CI needs to be placed back into the repository. Checking in describes these activities.
	Select versioning strategy	The new CI has to be placed back in the repository using a versioning strategy. This describes the selection of the strategy used to place the CI back into the repository.
	Create branch	The CI is selected to be the start of a new branch.
	Create revision	The CI is selected to be a revision of another CI.
	Select development state	The CI is determined to be of a certain development state.
	Write CI	The CI is stored in the repository.
	Unlock CI	The CI is unlocked.

=== Evaluation ===
Feiler (1991) evaluated the check-out/check-in synchronization model. It has the clear advantage that it's easy to use and understand. However, this simplicity results in a lack of management of configurations, such as product version tracking and checking version history across multiple logically connected files.

The turn-taking mechanism of locking is a real problem as well when working with many developers, as these files cannot be edited by others once it has been locked.

=== Example ===
To illustrate the check-out/check-in synchronization model, this section contains an example of how this process works. The figure below contains a state transition diagram of a CI.

When a CI is first created, it is modified and stored in the repository. When someone requests to open the CI, it is first copied to the local machine of the developer (note: there are systems where editing occurs directly in the repository. The copy step however is the classic check-out/check-in way). When that developer also wants to edit the CI, it requests a lock. This can be done directly at the request of opening a CI, but also after some time of reading it. When the CI is not locked yet, a lock is applied and it can be modified by the developer. After modifications have been done, it is stored back in the repository and unlocked. Now, assume that the developer that was just discussed is in the process of editing a CI that is already in the repository. You want to open a CI from the repository and so it is copied to your local drive. You start reading it and find some things you wish to change, so you request to edit it. However, the CI is already locked and you will have to wait for it to be unlocked or close the file and proceed to another one.

== See also ==
- Configuration management
- Revision control
- Change management process
- Release management
- Product structure modeling
- Product family engineering
- Product life-cycle management
- List of revision control software
