= Lump sum contract =

Type of construction contract

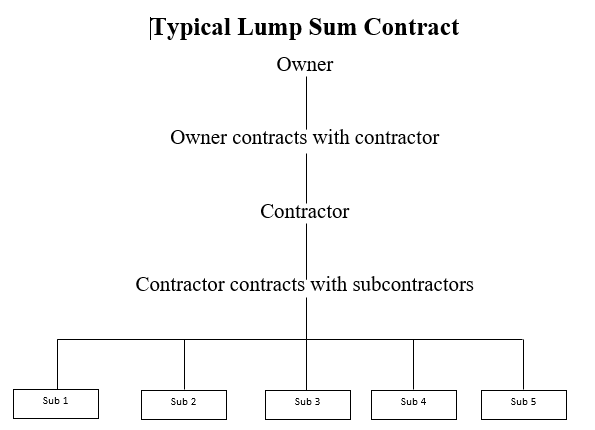
Typical Lump Sum Contract Structure

A lump sum contract in construction is one type of construction contract, sometimes referred to as stipulated-sum, where a single price is quoted for an entire project based on plans and specifications and covers the entire project and the owner knows exactly how much the work will cost in advance. This type of contract requires a full and complete set of plans and specifications and includes all the indirect costs plus the profit and the contractor will receive progress payments each month minus retention. The flexibility of this contract is very minimal and changes in design or deviation from the original plans would require a change order paid by the owner. In this contract the payment is made according to the percentage of work completed. The lump sum contract is different from guaranteed maximum price in a sense that the contractor is responsible for additional costs beyond the agreed price, however, if the final price is less than the agreed price then the contractor will gain and benefit from the savings.

There are some factors that make for a successful execution of a lump sum contract on a project such as experience and confidence, management skills, communication skills, having a clear work plan, proper list of deliverables, contingency, and dividing the responsibility among the project team.

According to Associated General Contractors of America (AGC),

In a lump sum contract, the owner has essentially assigned all the risk to the contractor, who in turn can be expected to ask for a higher markup in order to take care of unforeseen contingencies. A Contractor under a lump sum agreement will be responsible for the proper job execution and will provide its own means and methods to complete the work.

With a lump sum contract or fixed-price contract, the contractor assesses the value of work as per the documents available, primarily the specifications and the drawings. At pre-tender stage the contractor evaluates the cost to execute the project (based on the above documents such as drawings, specifications, schedules, tender instruction and any clarification received in response to queries) and quotes a fixed inclusive price.

== Advantages ==
- The owner's risk is reduced due to the price of the contract being fixed and variations are not as much like other contracts.
- There are fewer change orders.
- The bidding and contractor selection is less complicated.
- Obtaining construction loans are easier with this type of contract.
- The profit margins and percentages are greater for engineers and contractors.
- Payments and instalments are made on regular basis which provides the contractor with a reliable cash flow.
- Management of the contract is a lot easier for the owner.
- It creates an improved communication and relationship between the design team, contractor, and the owner.

== Disadvantages ==
- There is a higher risk for the contractor.
- Proper change order documentation is required which could be time-consuming.
- Higher fixed price due to unforeseen conditions.
- The contractor selection usually takes longer.
- The design has to be completed before the start of activities.
- Change orders could be rejected by the owner.
- It increases the adversarial relationship among the stakeholders of the project.
- The contractor has a freedom to choose its own methods.
- Potential for disputes between the client and the contractor, due to for example unbalanced bids, change orders, design changes, and compensation for early completion.

== Variations to lump sum contracts ==
Variations occur due to fluctuation in prices and inflation, provisional items, statutory fees, relevant events such as failure of the owner to deliver goods, etc. Where the cost of a specific activity is identified as a "provisional sum", a variation in actual cost may be accepted by the employer.

Variations are typically broken down into two categories, beneficial and detrimental, where the former is for improvement of work quality, cost and schedule reduction, and the latter is a negative change in performance or quality of work due to client's financial difficulties. There are many reasons for variations to occur but main causes are normally due to omission in design, inadequate design, changes in specifications and scope, and lack of coordination and communication among the stakeholders.

== Case law ==
- Harvey Shopfitters Limited -v- ADI Limited (2003): Work was commenced under a Letter of Intent but a formal contract document was never completed. Harvey wanted to be paid for work on a quantum meruit basis; ADI argued that a lump sum contract had been agreed and should be enforced. The England and Wales Court of Appeal held that there was sufficient certainty in the parties' prepared agreements to establish that a lump sum contract was in place.
