= Design change =

Product modification

A design change is a modification to the design of a product or system. Design changes can happen at any stage in the product development process as well as later in the product or system's lifecycle.

Design changes that happen early in the design process are less expensive when compared to those that take place after it is introduced into full-scale production. The cost of the change increases with its development time. Fundamentally, design changes can be classified into pre production and post production changes. The pre-production changes can happen in the conceptual design stage, prototype stage, detailing stage, testing stage. The post -production stage changes can happen almost immediately the product is introduced into the production or much later in the product lifecycle This might be due to many reasons including response to a changing market demand, uncovering of design faults that need to be corrected, the product or system not meeting stakeholder requirements, parts becoming obsolete or no longer available from suppliers, and so forth. One of the tools to manage design changes is the House of Quality which can help to trace the impacts of a proposed change to understand who and what will be affected.

One of the issues in handling design changes is that they propagate or 'ripple out' from the points of initiation. This is because, for example, a change to one part design will also require changes to others, so they can continue to fit together and work together to deliver a design's functionality. Understanding these ripple effects may determine whether to accept a change request and in coordinating the change's implementation. A range of approaches have been developed to help predict and manage design change ripple effects. Some are quite practical while others remain in the research domain.

== See also ==
- Change control
- Change management (engineering)
- Engineering change order
