= Process-data diagram =

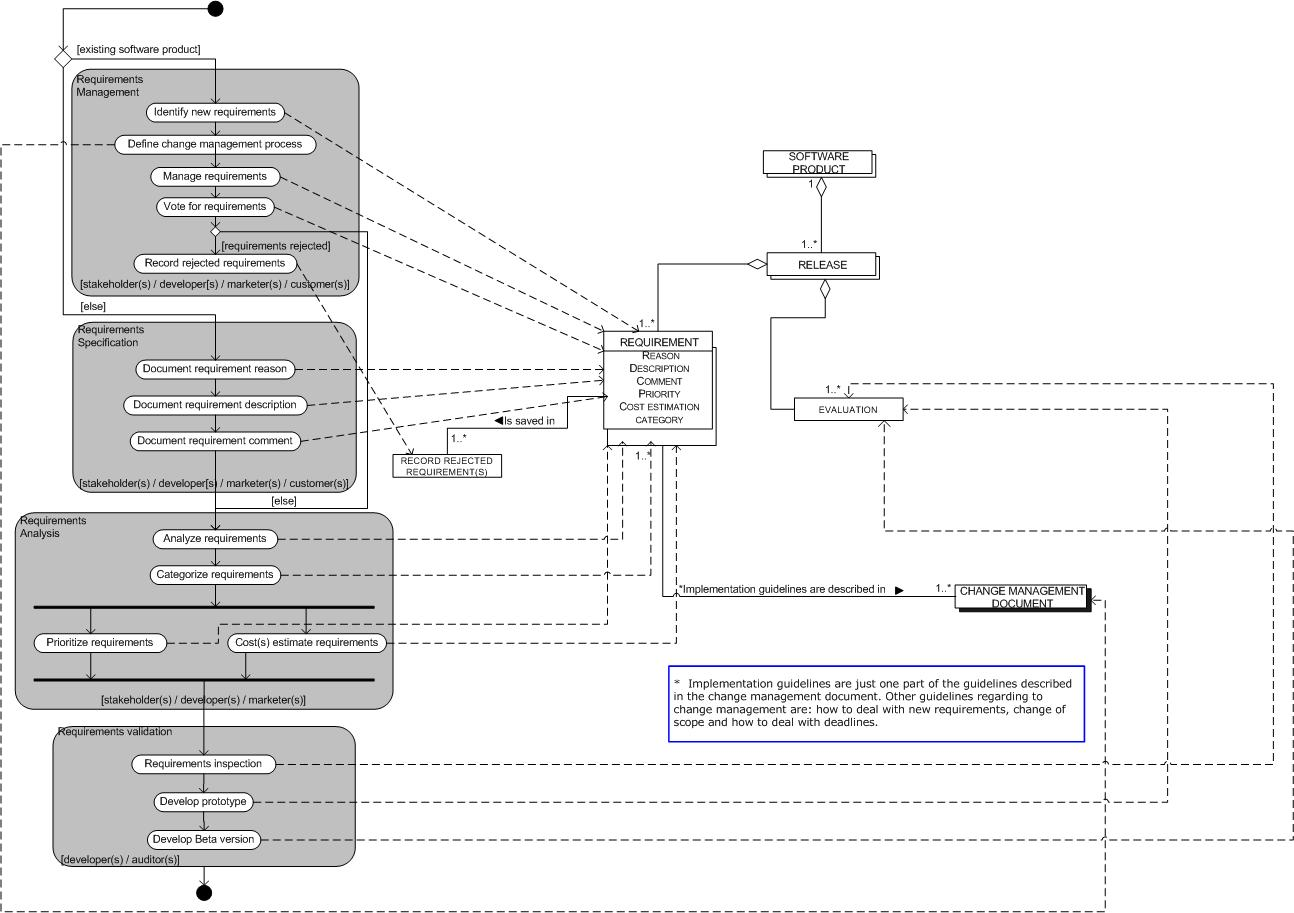
The process data diagram

A process-data diagram (PDD), also known as process-deliverable diagram, is a diagram that describes processes and data that act as output of these processes. On the left side the meta-process model can be viewed and on the right side the meta-data model can be viewed.

A process-data diagram can be seen as combination of a business process model and data model.

== Overview ==
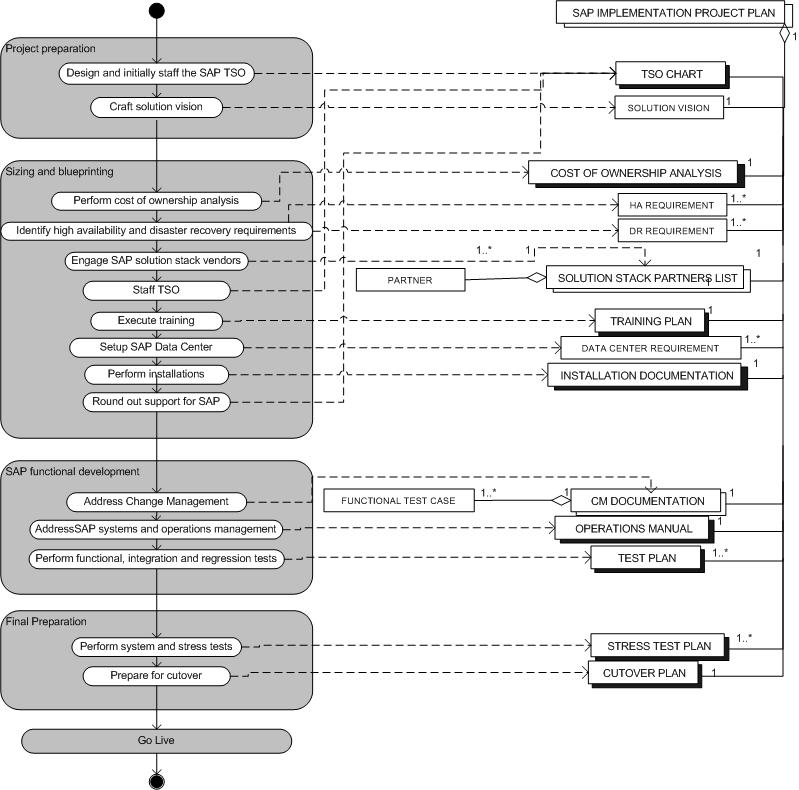
SAP Implementation process-data diagram

The process-data diagram that is depicted at the right, gives an overview of all of these activities/processes and deliverables. The four gray boxes depict the four main implementation phases, which each contain several processes that are in this case all sequential. The boxes at the right show all the deliverables/concepts that result from the processes. Boxes without a shadow have no further sub-concepts. Boxes with a black shadow depict complex closed concepts, so concepts that have sub-concepts, which however will not be described in any more detail. Boxes with a white shadow (a box behind it) depict open closed concepts, where the sub-concepts are expanded in greater detail. The lines with diamonds show a has-a relationship between concepts.

The SAP Implementation process is made up out of four main phases, i.e. the project preparation where a vision of the future-state of the SAP solution is being created, a sizing and blueprinting phase where a software stack is acquired and training is being performed, a functional development phase and finally a final preparation phase, when the last tests are being performed before the actual go live. For each phase, the vital activities are addressed and the deliverables/products are explained.

== Process-data diagram building blocks ==
=== Sequential activities ===
Sequential activities are activities that need to be carried out in a pre-defined order. The activities are connected with an arrow, implying that they have to be followed in that sequence. Both activities and sub-activities can be modeled in a sequential way. In Figure 1 an activity diagram is illustrated with one activity and two sequential sub-activities. A special kind of sequential activities are the start and stop states, which are also illustrated in Figure 1.

In Figure 2 an example from practice is illustrated. The example is taken from the requirements capturing workflow in UML-based Web Engineering. The main activity, user & domain modeling, consists of three activities that need to be carried out in a predefined order.

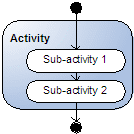
1: Sequential activities

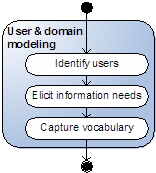
2: Example

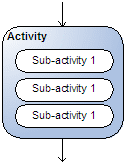
3: Unordered activities

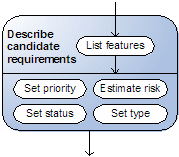
4: Example

=== Unordered activities ===
Unordered activities are used when sub-activities of an activity do not have a pre-defined sequence in which they need to be carried out. Only sub-activities can be unordered. Unordered activities are represented as sub-activities without transitions within an activity, as is represented in Figure 3.

Sometimes an activity consists of both sequential and unordered sub-activities. The solution to this modeling issue is to divide the main activity in different parts. In Figure 4 an example is illustrated, which clarifies the necessity to be able to model unordered activities. The example is taken from the requirements analysis workflow of the Unified Process. The main activity, “describe candidate requirements”, is divided into two parts. The first part is a sequential activity. The second part consists of four activities that do not need any sequence in order to be carried out correctly.

=== Concurrent activities ===
Activities can occur concurrently. This is handled with forking and joining. By drawing the activities parallel in the diagram, connected with a synchronization bar, one can fork several activities. Later on these concurrent activities can join again by using the same synchronization bar. Both activities and sub-activities can occur concurrently. In the example of Figure 5, Activity 2 and Activity 3 are concurrent activities.

In Figure 6, a fragment of a requirements capturing process is depicted. Two activities, defining the actors and defining the use cases, are carried out concurrently. The reason for carrying out these activities concurrently is that defining the actors influences the use cases greatly, and vice versa.

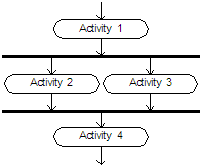
5: Concurrent activities

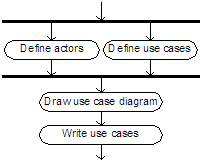
6: Example

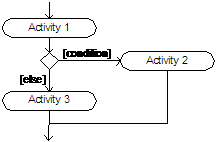
7: Conditional activities

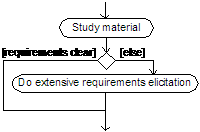
8: Example

=== Conditional activities ===
Conditional activities are activities that are only carried out if a pre-defined condition is met. This is graphically represented by using a branch. Branches are illustrated with a diamond and can have incoming and outgoing transitions. Every outgoing transition has a guard expression, the condition. This guard expression is actually a Boolean expression, used to make a choice which direction to go. Both activities and sub-activities can be modeled as conditional activities. In Figure 7 two conditional activities are illustrated.

In Figure 8 an example from practice is illustrated. A requirements analysis starts with studying the material. Based on this study, the decision is taken whether to do an extensive requirements elicitation session or not. The condition for not carrying out this requirements session is represented at the left of the branch, namely [requirements clear]. If this condition is not met, [else], the other arrow is followed.

The integration of both types of diagrams is quite straightforward. Each action or activity results in a concept. They are connected with a dotted arrow to the produced artifacts, as is demonstrated in Figure 9. The concepts and activities are abstract in this picture.

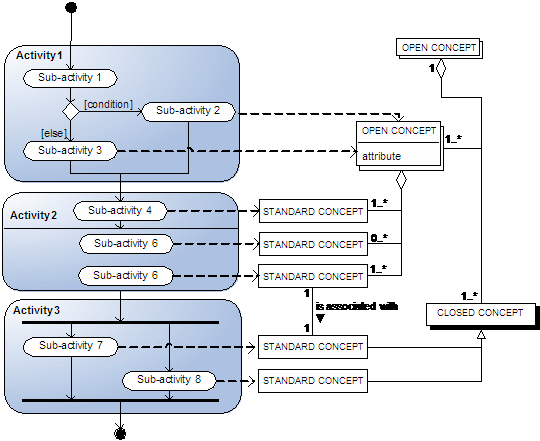
Figure 9: Process-Data Diagram

In Table 1 a generic table is presented with the description of activities, sub-activities and their relations to the concepts. In section 5 examples are given of both process-data diagram and activity table.

Activity	Sub-Activity	Description
Activity 2	Sub-activity 4	Sub-activity 4 results in a STANDARD CONCEPT

Table 1: Activity table

== Example of a process-data diagram ==
In Figure 10 an example of a process-data diagram is illustrated. It concerns an example from the orientation phase of complex project in a WebEngineering method.

Notable is the use of open and closed concepts. Since project management is actually not within the scope of this research, the concept CONTROL MANAGEMENT has not been expanded. However, in a complex project is RISK MANAGEMENT of great importance. Therefore, the choice is made to expand the RISK MANAGEMENT concept.

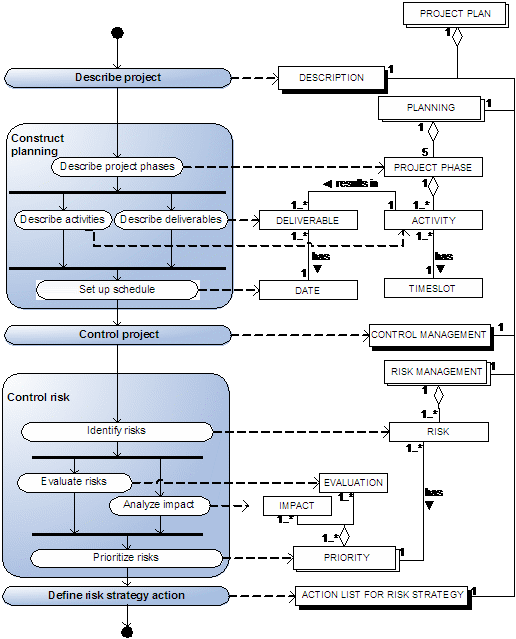
Figure 10: Example Process-Data Diagram - Orientation phase in a complex project

In Table 2 the activities and sub-activities, and relation to the concepts are described.

Activity	Sub-Activity	Description
Describe Project		Describing the project is done in terms of participants, targets, products, scope and assumptions. This information is derived from the proposal, but with more emphasis on the project management issues. The activity end in a project DESCRIPTION.
Construct planning	Describe project phases	The PLANNING is divided into five PROJECT PHASES, which should be shortly described.
Construct planning	Describe activities	The project ACTIVITIES are described and grouped into PROJECT PHASES.
Construct planning	Describe deliverables	The DELIVERABLES that result from the project ACTIVITIES are described.
Construct planning	Set up schedule	For every DELIVERABLE a DATE is set and for each ACTIVITY a TIME SLOT is estimated.
Control project		Controlling the project results in a CONTROL MANAGEMENT artifact. This artifact is not further explained here, since it concerns regular project management issues, like communication management, progress management, change management and problem management that lie outside the scope of this research.
Control risk	Identify risks	Identifying risks can be done by using standard checklists or organizing risk workshops. The RISKS are included in the PROJECT PLAN.
Control risk	Evaluate risks	Every RISK is provided with an EVALUATION; a description and estimation about the complexity or uncertainty of a project is given.
Control risk	Analyze impact	Analyzing the impact of a risk handles about the IMPACT, a risk has on the success of a project. The evaluation and risk values are indicated by selecting a value: low, moderate or high.
Control risk	Prioritize risks	Prioritizing the risks is done by combining IMPACT and EVALUATION in a table. High priority is then given to RISKS with the highest scores.
Define actions for risk strategy		Risk strategy actions can be obtained from experience or from relevant literature. The project manager adapts the actions to the project in the ACTION LIST FOR RISK STRATEGY. RISKS with the highest priority are on top of the list and need to be handled first.

Table 2: Activities and sub-activities in a complex orientation phase

== See also ==
- Acquisition Initiation (ISPL)
- Change management (engineering)
- Dynamic Systems Development Method
- ITIL Security Management
- Implementation Maturity Model Assessment
- Managing stage boundaries
- Metadata modeling
- Object Process Methodology
- PREview
- Product Family Engineering
- Product Structure Modeling
- Synchronization model
