= Changeset =

In version control software, a changeset (also known as commit and revision) is a set of alterations packaged together, along with meta-information about the alterations. A changeset describes the exact differences between two successive versions in the version control system's repository of changes. Changesets are typically treated as an atomic unit, an indivisible set, by version control systems. This is one synchronization model.

== Terminology ==
In the Git version control system a changeset is called a commit, not to be confused with the commit operation that is used to commit a changeset (or in Git's case technically a snapshot) to a repository.

Other version control systems also use other names to refer to changesets, for example Darcs calls them "patches", while Pijul refers to them as "changes".

== Metadata ==
Version control systems attach metadata to changesets. Typical metadata includes a description provided by the programmer (a "commit message" in Git lingo), the name of the author, the date of the commit, etc.

Unique identifiers are an important part of the metadata which version control systems attach to changesets. Centralized version control systems, such as Subversion and CVS simply use incrementing numbers as identifiers. Distributed version control systems, such as Git, generate a unique identifier by applying a cryptographic hash function to the changeset.

== Best practices ==
Because version control systems operate on changesets as atomic units, and because communication within development teams improves performance, there are certain best practices to follow when creating changesets. Only the 2 most significant are mentioned here, changeset content atomicity and changeset descriptions.

Changeset content should involve only one task or fix, and contain only code which works and does not knowingly break existing functionality.

Changeset descriptions should be short, recording why the modification was made, the modification's effect or purpose, and describing non-obvious aspects of how the change works.

== See also ==
- Patch (computing)
- Snapshot (computer storage)
