= Hong Kong CyberU =

- 香港網上學府
- Type: E-learning
- Established: 2000
- Parent institution: Hong Kong Polytechnic University
- Location: Hung Hom, Kowloon, Hong Kong
- Website: www.hkcyberu.com

Hong Kong CyberU (or HKCyberU; Chinese: 香港網上學府) was a virtual school developed by The Hong Kong Polytechnic University (PolyU) and PCCW in 2000. It later became the online arm of PolyU. HKCyberU adopts a ‘blended mode’ of study to combine the flexibility of web-based learning with personal guidance through face-to-face tutorials. It provides web-based programmes leading to academic awards (up to postgraduates level) offered by PolyU and other institutions in the Mainland and overseas.

The objective is to fulfil the needs of working professionals and executives in acquiring recognised university qualifications and professional education through part-time and web-based studies with maximum flexibility. HKCyberU was terminated in 2012.

== History ==
HKCyberU has been awarded as "The Best Wired/Virtual Campus" in 2006 (April 2006, A-Plus).

In December 2007, HKCyberU presented scholarships to its master's degree students who attained distinguished academic performance in the year 2006/07.

== Programmes leading to PolyU awards ==
- Master of/Postgraduate Diploma in Professional Accounting (offered by Graduate School of Business)
- Master of Science/Postgraduate Diploma in E-Commerce (offered by Department of Computing)
- Master of Science/Postgraduate Diploma in Information Systems (offered by Department of Computing)
- Master of Science/Postgraduate Diploma in Knowledge Management (offered by Department of Industrial and Systems Engineering)
- Master of Science/Postgraduate Diploma in Project Management (offered by Department of Building & Real Estate)
- Master of Science/Postgraduate Diploma in Software Technology (jointly offered by Department of Computing and Graduate University of the Chinese Academy of Sciences)
- Bachelor of Science (Honours) in Nursing (offered by School of Nursing)

== Programmes leading to awards from overseas universities ==
Heriot-Watt University, UK

- Doctor of Business Administration (DBA)
- Master of Business Administration (MBA)
- Master of Business Administration (Chinese version)
- Master of Science in Financial Management
- Master of Science in Human Resource Management
- Master of Science in Marketing
- Master of Science in Strategic Planning

Edith Cowan University, AU

- Master of Environmental Management
- Master of Security Management

The College of Estate Management, UK

- Degree awarded by The University of Reading, UK
  - MBA in Construction & Real Estate
  - Master of Science in Surveying
  - Bachelor of Science in Building Surveying
  - Bachelor of Science in Construction Management
  - Bachelor of Science in Estate Management
  - Bachelor of Science in Quantity Surveying
- Degree awarded by The College of Estate Management, UK
  - Postgraduate Diploma in Arbitration
  - Postgraduate Diploma in Surveying

== Programmes leading to awards from mainland China ==
- East China Normal University
- Institute of Policy and Management, Chinese Academy of Sciences (中國科學院科技政策與管理科學研究所)

== Short courses ==
- E-Quiz for Estate Agents Authority
- Preparatory Course for HKCEE English
- Preparatory Course for IELTS
