= Digital mockup =

Digital model of a product

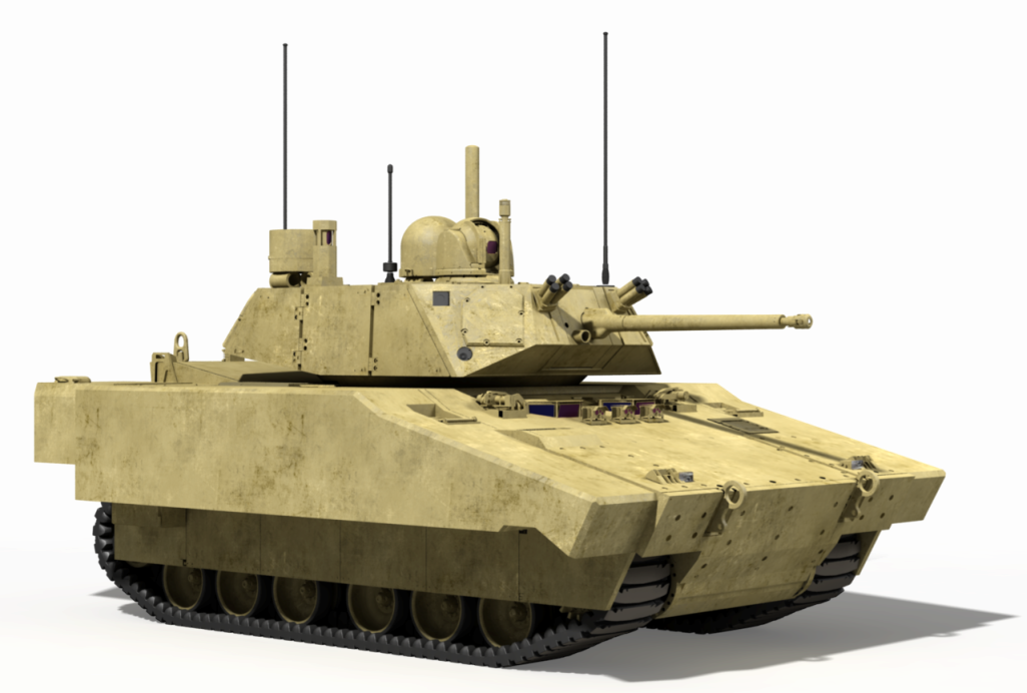
Digital mockup of XM1202 Mounted Combat System

A digital mockup (or digital mock-up) is the digital description of a product, usually in three dimensions. The product design engineers, the manufacturing engineers, and the support engineers work together to create and manage the mock-up. As an extension it is also frequently referred to as digital prototyping or virtual prototyping. Digital mock-ups allows engineers to design and configure complex product prototypes and validate their designs without ever needing to build a physical model.

Mockups can be convincing and closely resemble the final product in appearance, allowing early revisions rather than changes much later in the production stage.

A mockup may be a static image that shows just one view, an animated graphic showing different views of the product or an interactive that allows virtual interaction with the product.

== See also ==
- 3D modeling
- 3D printing
- Computer-aided design
- Digital twin
- Product structure modeling
- Virtual prototyping
