= JRipples =

- Developers: Jonathan Buckner, Joseph Buchta, Maksym Petrenko, Václav Rajlich, Laurentiu Radu Vanciu
- Stable release: 3.2.1 / October 7, 2010; 15 years ago
- Written in: Java
- Operating system: Cross-platform
- Type: Change impact analysis tool
- Website: https://jripples.sourceforge.net/

JRipples is a change impact analysis tool for the Java programming language. It helps a developer calculate the impact of software change. It is an open source Eclipse plug-in. The tool not only give relevant program analysis, but it also organizes the steps of change propagation.
