= Change order =

Modification of work in a contracted project

In project management, change orders are also called variations or variation orders. Any modification or change to works agreed in the contract is treated as a variation.

== Types ==
These modifications can be divided into three main categories

1. Addition to the work agreed in the contract.
2. Omission of work agreed in the contract.
3. Substitution or alteration of work agreed in the contract.

== Purpose ==
A change order is work that is added to or deleted from the original scope of work of a contract. Depending on the magnitude of the change, it may or may not alter the original contract amount and/or completion date. A change order may force a new project to handle significant changes to the current project.

Change orders are common to most projects, and very common with large projects. After the original scope (or contract) is formed, complete with the total price to be paid and the specific work to be completed, a client may decide that the original plans do not best represent his or her definition for the finished project. Accordingly, the client will suggest an alternate approach.

== Causes and resolution ==
Common causes for change orders to be created are:

- The project's work was incorrectly estimated
- The customer or project team discovers obstacles or possible efficiencies that require them to deviate from the original plan
- The customer or project team are inefficient or incapable of completing their required deliverables within budget, and additional money, time, or resources must be added to the project
- During the course of the project, additional features or options are perceived and requested.
- If the contractor has to add work items to the original scope of work at a later time in order to achieve the customer's demands, a fair price for the work items and fees must be added for the materials and labor.

A project manager then typically generates a change order that describes the new work to be done (or not done in some cases), and the price to be paid for this new work. Once this change order is submitted and approved it generally serves to alter the original contract such that the change order now becomes part of the contract.

== See also ==
- Business management
- Change control
- Change request
- Engineering change order
