= ITIL security management =

ITIL security management describes the structured fitting of security into an organization. ITIL security management is based on the ISO 27001 standard. "ISO/IEC 27001:2005 covers all types of organizations (e.g. commercial enterprises, government agencies, not-for profit organizations). ISO/IEC 27001:2005 specifies the requirements for establishing, implementing, operating, monitoring, reviewing, maintaining and improving a documented Information Security Management System within the context of the organization's overall business risks. It specifies requirements for the implementation of security controls customized to the needs of individual organizations or parts thereof. ISO/IEC 27001:2005 is designed to ensure the selection of adequate and proportionate security controls that protect information assets and give confidence to interested parties."

A basic concept of security management is information security. The primary goal of information security is to control access to information. The value of the information is what must be protected. These values include confidentiality, integrity and availability. Inferred aspects are privacy, anonymity and verifiability.

The goal of security management comes in two parts:

- Security requirements defined in service level agreements (SLA) and other external requirements that are specified in underpinning contracts, legislation and possible internal or external imposed policies.
- Basic security that guarantees management continuity. This is necessary to achieve simplified service-level management for information security.

SLAs define security requirements, along with legislation (if applicable) and other contracts. These requirements can act as key performance indicators (KPIs) that can be used for process management and for interpreting the results of the security management process.

The security management process relates to other ITIL-processes. However, in this particular section the most obvious relations are the relations to the service level management, incident management and change management processes.

== Security management ==
Security management is a continuous process that can be compared to W. Edwards Deming's Quality Circle (Plan, Do, Check, Act).

The inputs are requirements from clients. The requirements are translated into security services and security metrics. Both the client and the plan sub-process affect the SLA. The SLA is an input for both the client and the process. The provider develops security plans for the organization. These plans contain policies and operational level agreements. The security plans (Plan) are then implemented (Do) and the implementation is then evaluated (Check). After the evaluation, the plans and the plan implementation are maintained (Act).

The activities, results/products and the process are documented. External reports are written and sent to the clients. The clients are then able to adapt their requirements based on the information received through the reports. Furthermore, the service provider can adjust their plan or the implementation based on their findings in order to satisfy all the requirements stated in the SLA (including new requirements).

=== Control ===
The first activity in the security management process is the “Control” sub-process. The Control sub-process organizes and manages the security management process. The Control sub-process defines the processes, the allocation of responsibility for the policy statements and the management framework.

The security management framework defines the sub-processes for development, implementation and evaluations into action plans. Furthermore, the management framework defines how results should be reported to clients.

Table 2.1.2: Concept and definition control sub-process Security management
Activities	Sub-Activities	Descriptions
Control	Implement policies	This process outlines the specific requirements and rules that have to be met in order to implement security management. The process ends with policy statement.
Control	Set up the security organization	This process sets up the organizations for information security. For example, in this process the structure the responsibilities are set up. This process ends with security management framework.
Control	Reporting	In this process the whole targeting process is documented in a specific way. This process ends with reports.

The meta-process model of the control sub-process is based on a UML activity diagram and gives an overview of the activities of the Control sub-process. The grey rectangle represents the control sub-process and the smaller beam shapes inside it represent activities that take place inside it.

Concept	Description
Control documents	Control is a description of how security management is organized and how it is managed.
Policy statements	Policy statements outline specific requirements or rules that must be met. In the information security realm, policies are usually point-specific, covering a single area. For example, "acceptable use" policies cover the rules and regulations for appropriate use of the computing facilities.
Security management framework	Security management framework is an established management framework to initiate and control the implementation of information security within an organization and to manage ongoing information security provision.

The meta-data model of the control sub-process is based on a UML class diagram. Figure 2.1.2 shows the metamodel of the control sub-process.

Figure 2.1.2: Meta-process model control sub-process

The CONTROL rectangle with a white shadow is an open complex concept. This means that the Control rectangle consists of a collection of (sub) concepts.

Figure 2.1.3 is the process data model of the control sub-process. It shows the integration of the two models. The dotted arrows indicate the concepts that are created or adjusted in the corresponding activities.

Figure 2.1.3: Process-data model control sub-process

=== Plan ===
The Plan sub-process contains activities that in cooperation with service level management lead to the (information) Security section in the SLA. Furthermore, the Plan sub-process contains activities that are related to the underpinning contracts which are specific for (information) security.

In the Plan sub-process the goals formulated in the SLA are specified in the form of operational level agreements (OLA). These OLA's can be defined as security plans for a specific internal organization entity of the service provider.

Besides the input of the SLA, the Plan sub-process also works with the policy statements of the service provider itself. As said earlier these policy statements are defined in the control sub-process.

The operational level agreements for information security are set up and implemented based on the ITIL process. This requires cooperation with other ITIL processes. For example, if security management wishes to change the IT infrastructure in order to enhance security, these changes will be done through the change management process. Security management delivers the input (Request for change) for this change. The Change Manager is responsible for the change management process.

Table 2.2.1: (Sub) activities and descriptions Plan sub-process ITIL Security Management
Activities	Sub-activities	Descriptions
Plan	Create Security section for SLA	This process contains activities that lead to the security agreements paragraph in the service level agreements. At the end of this process the Security section of the service level agreement is created.
Plan	Create underpinning contracts	This process contains activities that lead to underpinning contracts. These contracts are specific for security.
Plan	Create operational level agreements	The general formulated goals in the SLA are specified in operational level agreements. These agreements can be seen as security plans for specific organization units.
Plan	Reporting	In this process the whole Create plan process is documented in a specific way. This process ends with reports.

Plan consists of a combination of unordered and ordered (sub) activities. The sub-process contains three complex activities that are all closed activities and one standard activity.

Table 2.2.2: Concept and definition Plan sub-process security management
Concept	Description
Plan	Formulated schemes for the security agreements.
Security section of the security level agreements	The security agreements paragraph in the written agreements between a service provider and the customer(s) that documents agreed service levels for a service.
Underpinning contracts	A contract with an external supplier covering delivery of services that support the IT organisation in their delivery of services.
Operational level agreements	An internal agreement covering the delivery of services which support the IT organization in their delivery of services.

Just as the Control sub-process the Plan sub-process is modeled using the meta-modeling technique. The left side of figure 2.2.1 is the meta-data model of the Plan sub-process.

The Plan rectangle is an open (complex) concept which has an aggregation type of relationship with two closed (complex) concepts and one standard concept. The two closed concepts are not expanded in this particular context.

The following picture (figure 2.2.1) is the process-data diagram of the Plan sub-process. This picture shows the integration of the two models. The dotted arrows indicate which concepts are created or adjusted in the corresponding activities of the Plan sub-process.

Figure 2.2.1: Process-data model Plan sub-process

=== Implementation ===
The Implementation sub-process makes sure that all measures, as specified in the plans, are properly implemented. During the Implementation sub-process no measures are defined nor changed. The definition or change of measures takes place in the Plan sub-process in cooperation with the Change Management Process.

Table 2.3.1: (Sub) activities and descriptions Implementation sub-process ITIL Security Management
Activities	Sub-activities	Descriptions
Implement	Classifying and managing of IT applications	Process of formally grouping configuration items by type, e.g., software, hardware, documentation, environment and application. Process of formally identifying changes by type e.g., project scope change request, validation change request, infrastructure change request this process leads to asset classification and control documents.
Implement	Implement personnel security	Measures are adopted to give personnel safety and confidence and measures to prevent a crime/fraud. The process ends with personnel security.
Implement	Implement security management	Specific security requirements and/or security rules that must be met are outlined and documented. The process ends with security policies.
Implement	Implement access control	Specific access security requirements and/or access security rules that must be met are outlined and documented. The process ends with access control.
Implement	Reporting	The whole implement as planned process is documented in a specific way. This process ends with reports.

The left side of figure 2.3.1 is the meta-process model of the Implementation phase. The four labels with a black shadow mean that these activities are closed concepts and they are not expanded in this context. No arrows connect these four activities, meaning that these activities are unordered and the reporting will be carried out after the completion of all four activities.

During the implementation phase concepts are created and /or adjusted.

Table 2.3.2: Concept and definition Implementation sub-process Security management
Concept	Description
Implementation	Accomplished security management according to the security management plan.
Asset classification and control documents	A comprehensive inventory of assets with responsibility assigned to ensure that effective security protection is maintained.
Personnel security	Well defined job descriptions for all staff outlining security roles and responsibilities.
Security policies	Documents that outline specific security requirements or security rules that must be met.
Access control	Network management to ensure that only those with the appropriate responsibility have access to information in the networks and the protection of the supporting infrastructure.

The concepts created and/or adjusted are modeled using the meta-modeling technique. The right side of figure 2.3.1 is the meta-data model of the implementation sub-process.

Implementation documents are an open concept and is expanded upon in this context. It consists of four closed concepts that are not expanded because they are irrelevant in this particular context.

In order to make the relations between the two models clearer the integration of the two models is illustrated in Figure 2.3.1. The dotted arrows running from the activities to the concepts illustrate which concepts are created/ adjusted in the corresponding activities.

Figure 2.3.1: Process-data model Implementation sub-process

=== Evaluation ===
Evaluation is necessary to measure the success of the implementation and security plans. The evaluation is important for clients (and possibly third parties). The results of the Evaluation sub-process are used to maintain the agreed measures and the implementation. Evaluation results can lead to new requirements and a corresponding Request for Change. The request for change is then defined and sent to Change Management.

The three sorts of evaluation are self-assessment, internal audit and external audit.

The self-assessment is mainly carried out in the organization of the processes. Internal audits are carried out by internal IT-auditors. External audits are carried out by external, independent IT-auditors. Besides those already mentioned, an evaluation based on communicated security incidents occurs. The most important activities for this evaluation are the security monitoring of IT-systems; verify the security legislation and security plan implementation; trace and react to undesirable use of IT-supplies.

Table 2.4.1: (Sub) activities and descriptions Evaluation sub-process ITIL Security Management
Activities	Sub-Activities	Descriptions
Evaluate	Self-assessment	Examine implemented security agreements. The result of this process is self-assessment documents.
Evaluate	Internal Audit	Examine implemented security agreements by an internal EDP auditor. The result of this process is internal audit.
Evaluate	External audit	Examine implemented security agreements by an external EDP auditor. The result of this process is external audit.
Evaluate	Evaluation based on security incidents	Examine implemented security agreements based on security events that are not part of the standard operation of a service and which cause, or may cause, an interruption to, or a reduction in, the quality of that service. The result of this process is security incidents.
Evaluate	Reporting	Document the Evaluate implementation process in a specific way. This process ends with reports.

Figure 2.4.1: Process-data model Evaluation sub-process

The process-data diagram illustrated in the figure 2.4.1 consists of a meta-process model and a meta-data model. The Evaluation sub-process was modeled using the meta-modeling technique. The dotted arrows running from the meta-process diagram (left) to the meta-data diagram (right) indicate which concepts are created/ adjusted in the corresponding activities. All of the activities in the evaluation phase are standard activities. For a short description of the Evaluation phase concepts see Table 2.4.2 where the concepts are listed and defined.

Concept	Description
EVALUATION	Evaluated/checked implementation.
RESULTS	The outcome of the evaluated implementation.
SELF ASSESSMENT DOCUMENTS	Result of the examination of the security management by the organization of the process itself.
INTERNAL AUDIT	Result of the examination of the security management by the internal EDP auditor.
EXTERNAL AUDIT	Result of the examination of the security management by the external EDP auditor.
SECURITY INCIDENTS DOCUMENTS	Results of evaluating security events which is not part of the standard operation of a service and which causes, or may cause, an interruption to, or a reduction in, the quality of that service.

Table 2.4.2: Concept and definition evaluation sub-process Security management

=== Maintenance ===
Because of organizational and IT-infrastructure changes, security risks change over time, requiring revisions to the security section of service level agreements and security plans.

Maintenance is based on the results of the Evaluation sub-process and insight in the changing risks. These activities will produce proposals. The proposals either serve as inputs for the plan sub-process and travel through the cycle or can be adopted as part of maintaining service level agreements. In both cases the proposals could lead to activities in the action plan. The actual changes are made by the Change Management process.

Table 2.5.1: (Sub) activities and descriptions Maintenance sub-process ITIL Security Management
Activities	Sub-Activities	Descriptions
Maintain	Maintenance of Service level agreements	This keeps the service level agreements in proper condition. The process ends with maintained service level agreements.
Maintain	Maintenance of operational level agreements	This keeps the operational level agreements in proper condition. The process ends with maintained operational level agreements.
Maintain	Request for change to SLA and/or OLA	Request for a change to the SLA and/or OLA is formulated. This process ends with a request for change.
Maintain	Reporting	The implemented security policies process is documented in a specific way. This process ends with reports.

Figure 2.5.1 is the process-data diagram of the implementation sub-process. This picture shows the integration of the meta-process model (left) and the meta-data model (right). The dotted arrows indicate which concepts are created or adjusted in the activities of the implementation phase.

Figure 2.5.1: Process-data model Maintenance sub-process

The maintenance sub-process starts with the maintenance of the service level agreements and the maintenance of the operational level agreements. After these activities take place (in no particular order) and there is a request for a change the request for change activity will take place and after the request for change activity is concluded the reporting activity starts. If there is no request for a change then the reporting activity will start directly after the first two activities. The concepts in the meta-data model are created/ adjusted during the maintenance phase. For a list of the concepts and their definition take a look at table 2.5.2.

Table 2.5.2: Concept and definition Plan sub-process Security management
Concept	Description
MAINTENANCE DOCUMENTS	Agreements kept in proper condition.
MAINTAINED SERVICE LEVEL AGREEMENTS	Service Level Agreements(security paragraph) kept in proper condition.
MAINTAINED OPERATIONAL LEVEL AGREEMENTS	Operational Level Agreements kept in proper condition.
REQUEST FOR CHANGE	Form, or screen, used to record details of a request for a change to the SLA/OLA.

Table 2.5.2: Concept and definition Plan sub-process Security management

=== Complete process-data model ===
Figure 2.6.1: Complete process-data model Security Management process

== Relations with other ITIL processes ==
The Security Management Process, as stated in the introduction, has relations with almost all other ITIL-processes. These processes are:

- IT Customer Relationship Management
- Service Level Management
- Availability Management
- Capacity Management
- IT Service Continuity Management
- Configuration Management
- Release Management
- Incident Management & Service Desk
- Problem Management
- Change Management (ITSM)

Within these processes activities concerning security are required. The concerning process and its process manager are responsible for these activities. However, Security Management gives indications to the concerning process on how to structure these activities.

== Example: internal e-mail policies ==
Internal e-mail is subject to multiple security risks, requiring corresponding security plan and policies. In this example the ITIL security Management approach is used to implement e-mail policies.

The Security management team is formed and process guidelines are formulated and communicated to all employees and providers. These actions are carried out in the Control phase.

In the subsequent Planning phase, policies are formulated. Policies specific to e-mail security are formulated and added to service level agreements. At the end of this phase the entire plan is ready to be implemented.

Implementation is done according to the plan.

After implementation the policies are evaluated, either as self-assessments, or via internal or external auditors.

In the maintenance phase the e-policies are adjusted based on the evaluation. Needed changes are processed via Requests for Change.

== See also ==
- Infrastructure Management Services
- ITIL v3
- Microsoft Operations Framework
- Information security management system
- COBIT
- Capability Maturity Model
- ISPL

== See also ==
- Information security

== Sources ==
- Bon van, J. (2004). IT-Service management: een introductie op basis van ITIL. Van Haren Publishing
- Cazemier, Jacques A.; Overbeek, Paul L.; Peters, Louk M. (2000). Security Management, Stationery Office.
- Security management. (February 1, 2005). Microsoft
- Tse, D. (2005). Security in Modern Business: security assessment model for information security Practices. Hong Kong: University of Hong Kong.
