= Change request =

Declaration document

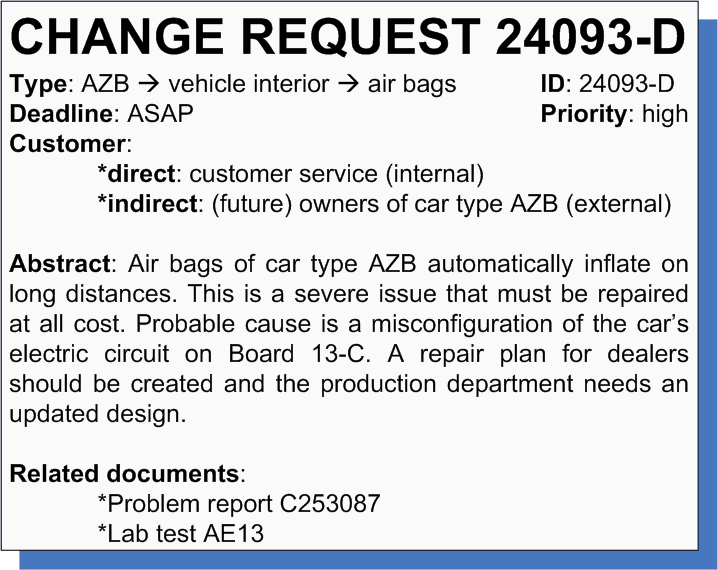
Figure 1: Example change request for the car industry

A change request, sometimes called change control request (CCR), is a document containing a call for an adjustment of a system; it is of great importance in the change management process.

== Purpose and elements ==
A change request is declarative, i.e. it states what needs to be accomplished, but leaves out how the change should be carried out. Important elements of a change request are an ID, the customer (ID), the deadline (if applicable), an indication whether the change is required or optional, the change type (often chosen from a domain-specific ontology) and a change abstract, which is a piece of narrative (Keller, 2005). An example of a change request can be found in Figure 1 on the right.

== Sources ==
Change requests typically originate from one of five sources:

1. problem reports that identify bugs that must be fixed, which forms the most common source
2. system enhancement requests from users
3. events in the development of other systems
4. changes in underlying structure and or standards (e.g. in software development this could be a new operating system)
5. demands from senior management (Dennis, Wixom & Tegarden, 2002).

Additionally, in Project Management, change requests may also originate from an unclear understanding of the goals and the objectives of the project.

== Synonyms ==
Change requests have many different names, which essentially describe the same concept:

- Request For Change (RFC) by Rajlich (1999); RFC is also a common term in ITIL (Keller, 2005) and PRINCE2 (Onna & Koning, 2003).
- Engineering Change (EC) by Huang and Mak (1999);
- Engineering Change Request (ECR) at Aero;
- Engineering Change Order (ECO) by Loch and Terwiesch (1999) and Pikosz and Malmqvist (1998). Engineering Change Order is a separate step after ECR. After ECR is approved by Engineering Department then an ECO is made for making the change;
- Change Notice at Chemical;
- Action Request (AR) at ABB Robotics AB (Kajko-Mattson, 1999);
- Change Request (CR) is, among others, used by Lam (1998), Mäkäräinen (2000), Dennis, et al. (2002), Crnkovic, Asklund and Persson-Dahlqvist (2003) and at ABB Automation Products AB (Kajko-Mattsson, 1999).
- Operational Change Request (OCR).
- Enterprise Change Request (ECR).

== See also ==
- Change management (engineering)
- Change control
- Change order
- Engineering Change Order
