= Change control =

Process ensuring that changes to a product or system are controlled

Within quality management systems (QMS) and information technology (IT) systems, change control is a process—either formal or informal—used to ensure that changes to a product or system are introduced in a controlled and coordinated manner. It reduces the possibility that unnecessary changes will be introduced to a system without forethought, introducing faults into the system or undoing changes made by other users of software. The goals of a change control procedure usually include minimal disruption to services, reduction in back-out activities, and cost-effective utilization of resources involved in implementing change. According to the Project Management Institute, change control is a "process whereby modifications to documents, deliverables, or baselines associated with the project are identified, documented, approved, or rejected."

Change control is used in various industries, including in IT, software development, the pharmaceutical industry, the medical device industry, and other engineering/manufacturing industries. For the IT and software industries, change control is a major aspect of the broader discipline of change management. Typical examples from the computer and network environments are patches to software products, installation of new operating systems, upgrades to network routing tables, or changes to the electrical power systems supporting such infrastructure.

Certain portions of ITIL cover change control.

== The process ==
There is considerable overlap and confusion between change management, configuration management and change control. The definition below is not yet integrated with definitions of the others.

Change control can be described as a set of six steps:

1. Plan / scope
2. Assess / analyze
3. Review / approval
4. Build / test
5. Implement
6. Close

=== Plan / scope ===
Consider the primary and ancillary detail of the proposed change. This should include aspects such as identifying the change, its owner(s), how it will be communicated and executed, how success will be verified, the change's estimate of importance, its added value, its conformity to business and industry standards, and its target date for completion.

=== Assess / analyze ===
Impact and risk assessment is the next vital step. When executed, will the proposed plan cause something to go wrong? Will related systems be impacted by the proposed change? Even minor details should be considered during this phase. Afterwards, a risk category should ideally be assigned to the proposed change: high-, moderate-, or low-risk. High-risk change requires many additional steps such as management approval and stakeholder notification, whereas low-risk change may only require project manager approval and minimal documentation. If not addressed in the plan/scope, the desire for a backout plan should be expressed, particularly for high-risk changes that have significant worst-case scenarios.

=== Review / approval ===
Whether it's a change controller, change control board, steering committee, or project manager, a review and approval process is typically required. The plan/scope and impact/risk assessments are considered in the context of business goals, requirements, and resources. If, for example, the change request is deemed to address a low severity, low impact issue that requires significant resources to correct, the request may be made low priority or shelved altogether. In cases where a high-impact change is requested but without a strong plan, the review/approval entity may request a full business case may be requested for further analysis.

=== Build / test ===
If the change control request is approved to move forward, the delivery team will execute the solution through a small-scale development process in test or development environments. This allows the delivery team an opportunity to design and make incremental changes, with unit and/or regression testing. Little in the way of testing and validation may occur for low-risk changes, though major changes will require significant testing before implementation. They will then seek approval and request a time and date to carry out the implementation phase. In rare cases where the solution can't be tested, special consideration should be made towards the change/implementation window.

=== Implement ===
In most cases a special implementation team with the technical expertise to quickly move a change along is used to implement the change. The team should also be implementing the change not only according to the approved plan but also according to organizational standards, industry standards, and quality management standards. The implementation process may also require additional staff responsibilities outside the implementation team, including stakeholders who may be asked to assist with troubleshooting. Following implementation, the team may also carry out a post-implementation review, which would take place at another stakeholder meeting or during project closing procedures.

=== Close ===
The closing process can be one of the more difficult and important phases of change control. Three primary tasks at this end phase include determining that the project is actually complete, evaluating "the project plan in the context of project completion", and providing tangible proof of project success. If despite best efforts something went wrong during the change control process, a post-mortem on what happened will need to be run, with the intent of applying lessons learned to future changes.

== Regulatory environment ==
In a good manufacturing practice regulated industry, the topic is frequently encountered by its users. Various industrial guidances and commentaries are available for people to comprehend this concept. As a common practice, the activity is usually directed by one or more SOPs. From the information technology perspective for clinical trials, it has been guided by another U.S. Food and Drug Administration document.

== See also ==
- Change request
- Change order
- Engineering change order
- Documentation
- Identifier
- Version control
- Changelog
- Living document
- Specification (technical standard)
- Standardization
- Scope management
