= Product structure modeling =

A product structure is a hierarchical decomposition of a product, typically known as the bill of materials (BOM). As business becomes more responsive to unique consumer tastes and derivative products grow to meet the unique configurations, BOM management can become unmanageable. For manufacturers, a bill of materials (BOM) is a critical product information record that lists the raw materials, assemblies, components, parts and the quantities of each needed to manufacture a product.

Advanced modeling techniques are necessary to cope with configurable products where changing a small part of a product can have multiple impacts on other product structure models. Concepts within this entry are in capital letters in order to indicate these concepts.

Several concepts are related to the subject of product structure modeling. All these concepts are discussed in this section. These concepts are divided into two main aspects. First the product breakdown is discussed which involves all the physical aspects of a product. Second, different views at the product structure are indicated.

== Product breakdown ==
Figure 1: product structure concepts

Figure 1 illustrates the concepts that are important to the structure of a product. This is a meta-data model, which can be used for modeling the instances in a specific case of product structuring.

The core of the product structure is illustrated by the product components (items) and their relationships. Thus, this involves the linking between items related to the product. The assembly can consist of subassemblies and parts, whereas subassemblies can also consist of other subassemblies or part. Thus, this is typically hierarchically ordered. These concepts are generalized into the concept of item. This classification is overlapping, because a subassembly could be a part in another assembly configuration. Due to differentiation and variation of items several concepts must be indicated into the product breakdown structure. Three concepts are involved in this differentiation, namely alternatives, variants and revisions. An alternative of an item is considered as a substitute for that particular item, whereas a variant is another option of an item which the consumer can choose. When an error occurs at a part or subassembly, it needs to be revised. This revision indicates the change history of the item.

== Product structure views ==
Product structure views are made upon several activity domains within the company. Due to the fact not everyone in the company has to have a detailed overview of the product several components with their attributes can be extracted.

When the Master Structure is made out of the several items of the product assembly, multiple views can be made upon this Master Structure. Thus this Master Structure contains every item in detail, which is important to the Assembly of the product.

Figure 2: Different product structure views

== The modeling process ==
The process of constructing the product model consists of six main activities, which can be decomposed in several sub-activities. The next table describes these activities and the sub-activities within them provided with a description about this activity.

Table 1: The activities within product structure modeling
| Activity | Sub-Activity | Description |
|---|---|---|
| Define product components | Identify parts | Identifying parts is concerned with the so-called bill of materials. Thus the materials are described for each product. Output of this activity is a list of parts for each product. |
| Define product components | Specify sub-assemblies | Several parts mulled together are described as a subassembly. But can also be an atomic component, which is part of the whole assembly. |
| Define product components | Configure product | The assembly is constructed of the parts and subassemblies. Output of this activity consists of the assembly. |
| Define product assortment | Specify variants | Variants of the items (parts, subassemblies, assemblies) are defined and specified. |
| Define product assortment | Specify alternatives | Alternatives of the items (parts, subassemblies, assemblies) are defined and specified |
| Define product assortment | Implement revision | If items (parts, subassemblies, assemblies) change they are implemented and the process of modeling the product structure is iterated, in order to ensure consistency. |
| Product structuring | Define relationships between items | The relationships between items are handled, which are eventually the actual structure of a product. |
| Create master structure | | Summation of the relationships of the items (parts, subassemblies, assemblies) resembles in a master structure. |
| Documenting | Link product definition | Documents that describe the parts are pointed out from the product structure. This allows the user to easily find a document of the correct revision. |
| Define product structure views | Specify needed views | The necessary views, which are important for the product, are specified. |
| Define product structure views | Create AD specific views | Views on the master structure are created for each Activity Domain (AD). |

== Process-data model ==
When combining the activities with the concepts of the product structure model it will result in a process-data diagram. This diagram displays the steps which need to be taken within the process of product structure modeling together with the deliverables, at the right side, which are outcomes of these activities.

Figure 3: Process-Data diagram product structure modeling

== Example ==
This example discusses the product structure modeling within car manufacturing. This will be discussed through the main activities which are identified within the process of product structure modeling.

=== Define product components ===
First, all components are identified and indicated. In the area of car manufacturing, the product components are as follows. A car (ASSEMBLY) consists of several SUBASSEMBLIES such as the body and the engine of the car. The engine for example is assembled in several parts such as screws and small pipes.

=== Define product assortment ===
In case of car manufacturing instances of these concepts can be made. For example an engine has several alternatives. For example a car manufacturer can choose between an engine made in America or Japan. Within these different engines, variants exist. Initially an engine can be made as a 1.6 engine, but a variant, such as a 1.8 engine, can be made of this engine. Thus the 1.6 engine is used as base concept for the new 1.8 engine.

Figure 4: product assortment

=== Product structuring ===
An example of a correlation between items within car manufacturing can be indicated as follows. The engine is connected to the body with several screws. Thus, these two items must be linked by the concept of a relationship.

Figure 5: product structure

=== Create master structure ===
After structuring the product with all the listed items and relationship between them this must be combined into one MASTER STRUCTURE which contains all of the details of the product. In case of the car, all items from engine to screw must be documented in one MASTER STRUCTURE.

Figure 6: product master structure

=== Documenting ===
When the MASTER STRUCTURE of the car is created one must link this structure with documents which contains the product definition of this specific car. Primarily, this consists of an extensive description of the car which is linked to the MASTER STRUCTURE of this product.

=== Define product structure views ===
In case of the car manufacturer multiple views can be derived from the car assembly. For example a structure from a sales point of view will need more detail about the functions and characteristics of the car rather than detailed information about the body. Thus a sales manager needs information about the color of the car or the type of gear (automatic of manual). From a purchasing view more information is needed about the mixing of the paint instead of the general color, which is only needed for the customer. Purchasing department also needs more information about the suppliers of the used components within the manufacturing of the car, so they can easily overview where which component is used and which supplier it comes from.

Figure 7: product structure views

== See also ==
- ISO 10303
- Assembly modeling
- Bill of materials (BOM)
- Product breakdown structure

== Bibliography ==
- Hvam, L. (1999). A procedure for building product models. Robotics and Computer-Integrated Manufacturing, 15, pp. 77-87
- Peltonen, H. (2000), Concepts and an Implementation for Product Data Management. Acta Polytechnica Scandinavica, Mathematics and Computing Series No. 105, pp. 188
- Rampersad, H.K. (1995). Concentric Design of Robotic Assembly Systems. Journal of Manufacturing Systems, 14(4), pp. 230-243
- Svensson, D., & Malmqvist, J. (2002). Strategies for Product Structure Management at Manufacturing Firms. Journal of Computing and Information Science in Engineering, 2(1), 50-58.
