= Glossary of project management =

A glossary of terms relating to project management and consulting.

== A ==
- Agile software development is a set of fundamental principles about how software should be developed based on an agile way of working in contrast to previous heavy-handed software development methodologies.
- Aggregate planning is an operational activity which does an aggregate plan for the production process, in advance of 2 to 18 months, to give an idea to management as to what quantity of materials and other resources are to be procured and when, so that the total cost of operations of the organization is kept to the minimum over that period.
- Allocation is the assignment of available resources in an economic way.

== B ==
- Benefits management plan a document that describes the activities necessary for achieving the benefits of a project and when these planned benefits will be delivered. It also outlines metrics and procedures to measure progress against benefits.
- BOSCARD a strategic planning tool used in project management to give the Terms of reference for new projects.
- Budget generally refers to a list of all planned expenses and revenues.
- Budgeted cost of work performed (BCWP) measures the budgeted cost of work that has actually been performed, rather than the cost of work scheduled.
- Budgeted cost of work scheduled (BCWS) the approved budget that has been allocated to complete a scheduled task (or Work Breakdown Structure (WBS) component) during a specific time period.
- Business case a document that examines business need and cost-benefits analysis of a project to justify the approval of the project and to set its boundaries.
- Business model is a profit-producing system that has an important degree of independence from the other systems within an enterprise.
- Business analysis is the set of tasks, knowledge, and techniques required to identify business needs and determine solutions to business problems. Solutions often include a systems development component, but may also consist of process improvement or organizational change.
- Business operations are those ongoing recurring activities involved in the running of a business for the purpose of producing value for the stakeholders. They are contrasted with project management, and consist of business processes.
- Business process is a collection of related, structured activities or tasks that produce a specific service or product (serve a particular goal) for a particular customer or customers. There are three types of business processes: Management processes, Operational processes, and Supporting processes.
- Business process modeling (BPM) is the activity of representing processes of an enterprise, so that the current ("as is") process may be analyzed and improved in future ("to be").

== C ==
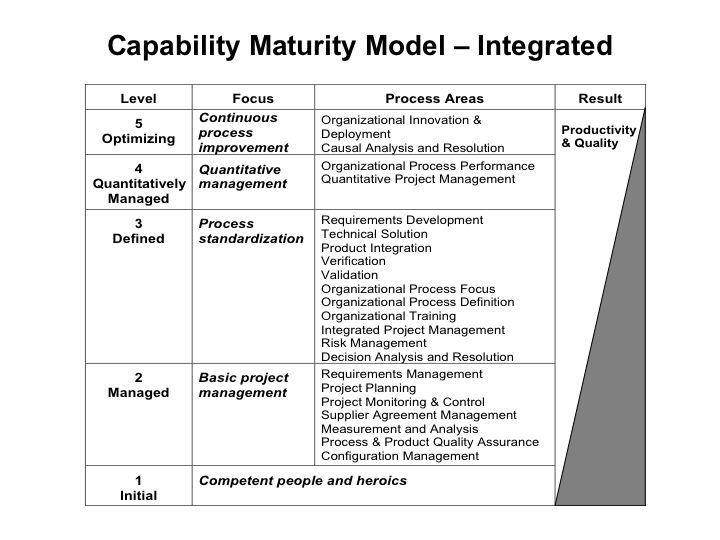
Capability maturity model.

PERT chart with two critical paths.

- Capability maturity model (CMM) in software engineering is a model of the maturity of the capability of certain business processes. A maturity model can be described as a structured collection of elements that describe certain aspects of maturity in an organization, and aids in the definition and understanding of an organization's processes.
- Change control is the procedures used to ensure that changes (within quality management systems (QMS) and information technology (IT) systems) are introduced in a controlled and coordinated manner. Change control is a major aspect of the broader discipline of change management.
- Change management is a field of management focused on organizational changes. It aims to ensure that methods and procedures are used for efficient and prompt handling of all changes to controlled IT infrastructure, in order to minimize the number and impact of any related incidents upon service.
- Case study is a research method which involves an in-depth, longitudinal examination of a single instance or event: a case. They provide a systematic way of looking at events, collecting data, analyzing information, and reporting the results.
- Certified Associate in Project Management is an entry-level certification for project practitioners offered by Project Management Institute.
- Communications log is an ongoing documentation of communication events between any identified project stakeholders, managed and collected by the project manager that describes: the sender and receiver of the communication event; where, when and for how long the communication event elapsed; in what form the communication event took place; a summary of what information was communicated; what actions/outcomes should be taken as a result of the communication event; and to what level of priority should the actions/outcomes of the communication event be graded
- Constructability is a project management technique to review the construction processes from start to finish during pre-construction phrase. It will identify obstacles before a project is actually built to reduce or prevent error, delays, and cost overrun.
- Constructability review is a process of reviewing design documents, construction drawings, specifications, and other construction documentation intended for use by a builder to construct the project. The purpose of a constructability review is to eliminate design errors, omissions, and coordination issues prior to bidding the documents so that the project bid is accurate, and less likely to create uncertainty, delays, added costs, or other risks during construction. Constructability reviews identify those risks so they can be corrected before bidding and constructing the project. Constructability reviews should be conducted by a multi-disciplined team of design, engineering, and construction professionals independent of the project designers. Constructability review comments should be addressed and resolved by modifying the bid documents prior to bidding or obtaining the construction contractor's price and before starting construction work to ensure accurate biddable, and buildable construction documents maximize construction efficiency, quality, and safety at the best price.
- Costs in economics, business, and accounting are the value of money that has been used up to produce something, and hence is not available for use anymore. In business, the cost may be one of acquisition, in which case the amount of money expended to acquire it is counted as cost.
- Cost engineering is the area of engineering practice where engineering judgment and experience are used in the application of scientific principles and techniques to problems of cost estimating, cost control, business planning and management science, profitability analysis, project management, and planning and scheduling."
- Construction, in the fields of architecture and civil engineering, is a process that consists of the building or assembling of infrastructure. Far from being a single activity, large scale construction is a feat of multitasking. Normally the job is managed by the project manager and supervised by the construction manager, design engineer, construction engineer or project architect.
- Cost overrun is defined as excess of actual cost over budget.
- Critical path method (CPM) is a mathematically based modeling technique for scheduling a set of project activities, used in project management.
- Critical chain project management (CCPM) is a method of planning and managing projects that puts more emphasis on the resources required to execute project tasks.

== D ==
- Dependency in a project network is a link amongst a project's terminal elements.
- Dynamic systems development method (DSDM) is a software development methodology originally based upon the rapid application development methodology. DSDM is an iterative and incremental approach that emphasizes continuous user involvement.
- Duration of a project's terminal element is the number of calendar periods it takes from the time the execution of element starts to the moment it is completed.
- Deliverable A contractually required work product, produced and delivered to a required state. A deliverable may be a document, hardware, software or other tangible product.

== E ==
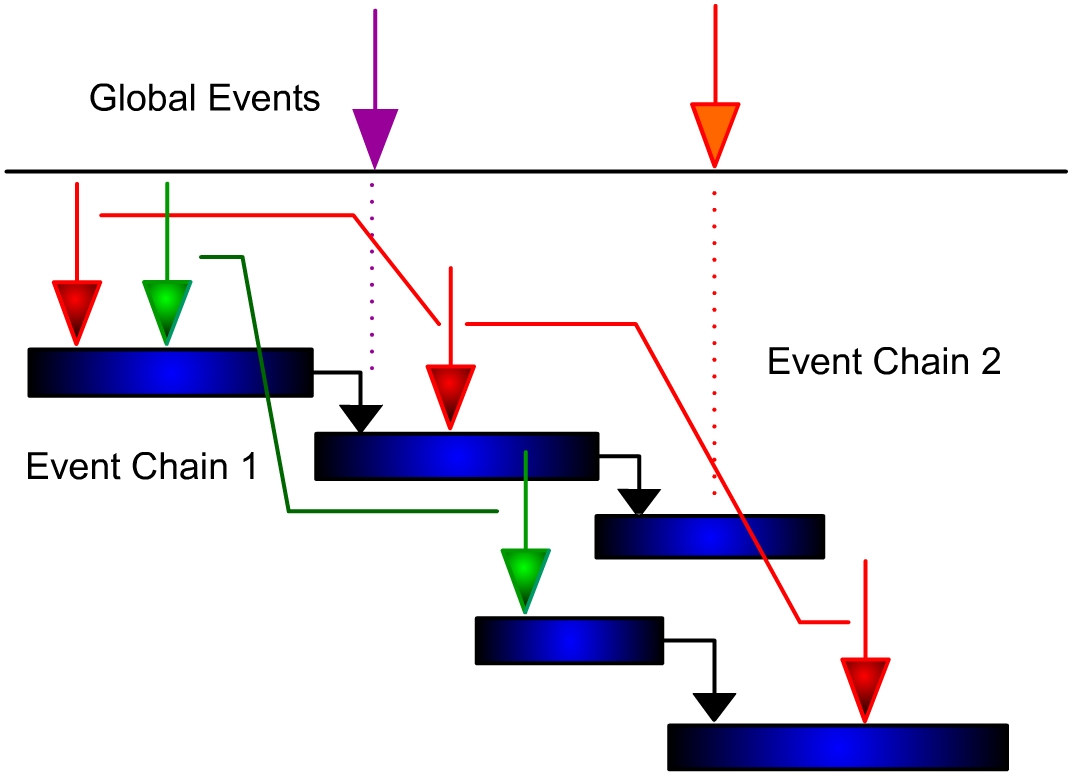
Event chain diagram

- Earned schedule (ES) is an extension to earned value management (EVM), which renames 2 traditional measures, to indicate clearly they are in units of currency or quantity, not time.
- Earned value management (EVM) is a project management technique for measuring project progress in an objective manner, with a combination of measuring scope, schedule, and cost in a single integrated system.
- Enterprise modeling is the process of understanding an enterprise business and improving its performance through creation of enterprise models. This includes the modelling of the relevant business domain (usually relatively stable), business processes (usually more volatile), and Information technology
- Estimation in project management is the processes of making accurate estimates using the appropriate techniques.
- Event chain diagram : diagram that show the relationships between events and tasks and how the events affect each other.
- Event chain methodology is an uncertainty modeling and schedule network analysis technique that is focused on identifying and managing events and event chains that affect project schedules.
- Executive sponsor is the senior member of the project board and often the chair.
- Extreme project management (XPM) refers to a method of managing very complex and very uncertain projects.

== F ==
- Float in a project network is the amount of time that a task in a project network can be delayed without causing a delay to subsequent tasks and or the project completion date.
- Focused improvement in Theory of Constraints is the ensemble of activities aimed at elevating the performance of any system, especially a business system, with respect to its goal by eliminating its constraints one by one and by not working on non-constraints.
- Fordism, named after Henry Ford, refers to various social theories. It has varying but related meanings in different fields, and for Marxist and non-Marxist scholars.

== G ==
A Gantt chart.

- Henry Gantt was an American mechanical engineer and management consultant, who developed the Gantt chart in the 1910s.
- Gantt chart is a type of bar chart that illustrates a project schedule. It illustrates the start and finish dates of the terminal elements and summary elements of a project. Terminal elements and summary elements comprise the work breakdown structure of the project.
- Goal or objective consists of a projected state of affairs which a person or a system plans or intends to achieve or bring about — a personal or organizational desired end-point in some sort of assumed development. Many people endeavor to reach goals within a finite time by setting deadlines
- Goal setting involves establishing specific, measurable and time targeted objectives
- Graphical Evaluation and Review Technique (GERT) is a network analysis technique that allows probabilistic treatment of both network logic and activity duration estimated.

== H ==
- Hammock activity is a grouping of subtasks that "hangs" between two end dates it is tied to (or the two end-events it is fixed to).
- HERMES is a Project Management Method developed by the Swiss Government, based on the German V-Modell. The first domain of application was software projects.

== I ==
- Integrated Master Plan (IMP) is an event-based, top level plan, consisting of a hierarchy of Program Events.
- ISO 10006 is a guidelines for quality management in projects, is an international standard developed by the International Organization for Standardization.
- Iterative and Incremental development is a cyclic software development process developed in response to the weaknesses of the waterfall model. It starts with an initial planning and ends with deployment with the cyclic interaction in between

== K ==
- Kickoff meeting is the first meeting with the project team and the client of the project.

== L ==
- Lehman Review is an independent peer review and evaluation of the status of a major construction project.
- Level of effort (LOE) is qualified as a support type activity which doesn't lend itself to measurement of a discrete accomplishment. Examples of such an activity may be project budget accounting, customer liaison, etc.
- Linear scheduling method (LSM) is a graphical scheduling method focusing on continuous resource utilization in repetitive activities. It is believed that it originally adopted the idea of Line-Of-Balance method.
- Lean manufacturing or lean production, which is often known simply as "Lean", is the practice of a theory of production that considers the expenditure of resources for any means other than the creation of value for the presumed customer to be wasteful, and thus a target for elimination.

== M ==
- Management in business and human organization activity is simply the act of getting people together to accomplish desired goals. Management comprises planning, organizing, staffing, leading or directing, and controlling an organization (a group of one or more people or entities) or effort for the purpose of accomplishing a goal.
- Management process is a process of planning and controlling the performance or execution of any type of activity.
- Management science (MS), is the discipline of using mathematical modeling and other analytical methods, to help make better business management decisions.
- Megaproject is an extremely large-scale investment project.
- Milestones are tools used in project management to mark specific points along a project timeline.
- Motivation is the set of reasons that prompts one to engage in a particular behavior.

== N ==
- Nonlinear management (NLM) is a superset of management techniques and strategies that allows order to emerge by giving organizations the space to self-organize, evolve and adapt, encompassing Agile, Evolutionary and Lean approaches, as well as many others.

== O ==
- Operations management is an area of business that is concerned with the production of good quality goods and services, and involves the responsibility of ensuring that business operations are efficient and effective. It is the management of resources, the distribution of goods and services to customers, and the analysis of queue systems.
- Operations, see Business operations
- Operations research (OR) is an interdisciplinary branch of applied mathematics and formal science that uses methods such as mathematical modeling, statistics, and algorithms to arrive at optimal or near optimal solutions to complex problems.
- Organization is a social arrangement which pursues collective goals, which controls its own performance, and which has a boundary separating it from its environment.
- Organization development (OD) is a planned, structured, organization-wide effort to increase the organization's effectiveness and health.

== P ==
Project Management Triangle

- PDCA (plan–do–check–act or plan–do–check–adjust) is an iterative design and management method used in business for the control and continual improvement of processes and products.
- Planning in organizations and public policy is both the organizational process of creating and maintaining a plan; and the psychological process of thinking about the activities required to create a desired goal on some scale.
- Portfolio in finance is an appropriate mix of or collection of investments held by an institution or a private individual.
- Postmortem documentation : A project post-mortem is a process used to identify the causes of a project failure (or significant business-impairing downtime), and how to prevent them in the future.
- Pre-mortem : A pre-mortem, or premortem, is a managerial strategy in which a project team imagines that a project or organization has failed, and then works backward to determine what potentially could lead to the failure of the project or organization.
- PRINCE2 : PRINCE2 is a project management methodology. The planning, monitoring and control of all aspects of the project and the motivation of all those involved in it to achieve the project objectives on time and to the specified cost, quality and performance.
- Process is an ongoing collection of activities, with an inputs, outputs and the energy required to transform inputs to outputs.
- Process architecture is the structural design of general process systems and applies to fields such as computers (software, hardware, networks, etc.), business processes (enterprise architecture, policy and procedures, logistics, project management, etc.), and any other process system of varying degrees of complexity.
- Process management is the ensemble of activities of planning and monitoring the performance of a process, especially in the sense of business process, often confused with reengineering.
- Product breakdown structure (PBS) in project management is an exhaustive, hierarchical tree structure of components that make up an item, arranged in whole-part relationship.
- Product description in project management is a structured format of presenting information about a project product
- Program evaluation and review technique (PERT) is a statistical tool, used in project management, designed to analyze and represent the tasks involved in completing a given project.
- Program management is the process of managing multiple ongoing inter-dependent projects. An example would be that of designing, manufacturing and providing support infrastructure for an automobile manufacturer.
- Project : A temporary endeavor undertaken to create a unique product, service, or result.
- Project accounting Is the practice of creating financial reports specifically designed to track the financial progress of projects, which can then be used by managers to aid project management.
- Project charter is a statement of the scope, objectives, and participants in a project.
- Project cost management A method of managing a project in real-time from the estimating stage to project control; through the use of technology cost, schedule and productivity is monitored.
- Project management : The complete set of tasks, techniques, tools applied during project execution'.
- Project Management Body of Knowledge (PMBOK) : The sum of knowledge within the profession of project management that is standardized by ISO.
- Project management office: The Project management office in a business or professional enterprise is the department or group that defines and maintains the standards of process, generally related to project management, within the organization. The PMO strives to standardize and introduce economies of repetition in the execution of projects. The PMO is the source of documentation, guidance and metrics on the practice of project management and execution.
- Project management process is the management process of planning and controlling the performance or execution of a project.
- Project management professional is a certificated professional in project management.
- Project management simulators are computer-based tools used in project management training programs. Usually, project management simulation is a group exercise. The computer-based simulation is an interactive learning activity.
- Project management software is a type of software, including scheduling, cost control and budget management, resource allocation, collaboration software, communication, quality management and documentation or administration systems, which are used to deal with the complexity of large projects.
- Project management triangle is a model of the constraints of project management.
- Project manager : professional in the field of project management. Project managers can have the responsibility of the planning, execution, and closing of any project, typically relating to construction industry, architecture, computer networking, telecommunications or software development.
- Project network is a graph (flow chart) depicting the sequence in which a project's terminal elements are to be completed by showing terminal elements and their dependencies.
- Project plan is a formal, approved document used to guide both project execution and project control. The primary uses of the project plan are to document planning assumptions and decisions, facilitate communication among stakeholders, and document approved scope, cost, and schedule baselines. A project plan may be summary or detailed.
- Project planning is part of project management, which relates to the use of schedules such as Gantt charts to plan and subsequently report progress within the project environment.
- Project stakeholders are those entities within or without an organization which sponsor a project or, have an interest or a gain upon a successful completion of a project.
- Project team is the management team leading the project, and provide services to the project. Projects often bring together a variety number of problems. Stakeholders have important issues with others.
- Proport refers to the combination of the unique skills of an organisation's members for collective advantage.

== Q ==
- Quality can mean a high degree of excellence ("a quality product"), a degree of excellence or the lack of it ("work of average quality"), or a property of something ("the addictive quality of alcohol").[1] Distinct from the vernacular, the subject of this article is the business interpretation of quality.
- Quality, cost, delivery (QCD) as used in lean manufacturing measures a businesses activity and develops Key performance indicators. QCD analysis often forms a part of continuous improvement programs

== R ==
- Reengineering is radical redesign of an organization's processes, especially its business processes. Rather than organizing a firm into functional specialties (like production, accounting, marketing, etc.) and considering the tasks that each function performs; complete processes from materials acquisition, to production, to marketing and distribution should be considered. The firm should be re-engineered into a series of processes.
- Resources are what is required to carry out a project's tasks. They can be people, equipment, facilities, funding, or anything else capable of definition (usually other than labour) required for the completion of a project activity.
- Resource leveling : 'A scheduling calculation that delays activities such that resource usage is kept below specified limits. It is also known as resource limited scheduling'.
- Risk is the precise probability of specific eventualities.
- Risk management is a management specialism aiming to reduce different risks related to a preselected domain to the level accepted by society. It may refer to numerous types of threats caused by environment, technology, humans, organizations and politics.
- Risk register is a tool commonly used in project planning and organizational risk assessments.

== S ==
The systems development life cycle.

- Schedules in project management consists of a list of a project's terminal elements with intended to start and finish dates.
- Scientific management is a theory of management that analyzes and synthesizes workflow processes, improving labor productivity.
- Scope of a project in project management is the sum total of all of its products and their requirements or features.
- Scope creep refers to uncontrolled changes in a project's scope. This phenomenon can occur when the scope of a project is not properly defined, documented, or controlled. It is generally considered a negative occurrence that is to be avoided.
- Scrum is an iterative incremental process of software development commonly used with agile software development. Despite the fact that "Scrum" is not an acronym, some companies implementing the process have been known to adhere to an all capital letter expression of the word, i.e. SCRUM.
- Six Sigma is a business management strategy, originally developed by Motorola, that today enjoys widespread application in many sectors of industry.
- Slot-based scheduling term is first used by IBM Spectrum Symphony as a resource allocation method. It is implemented to project management literature by mentioning each slot as the replaceable qualified human hours required to complete a given task.
- Software engineering is the application of a systematic, disciplined, quantifiable approach to the development, operation, and maintenance of software.
- Standards are documents approved by a recognized body, that provide, for common and repeated use, rules, guidelines, or characteristics for products, processes, or services with which compliance is not mandatory. (ISO 9453)
- Stakeholder Clients or other parties invested in the Project.
- Systems development life cycle (SDLC) is any logical process used by a systems analyst to develop an information system, including requirements, validation, training, and user ownership. An SDLC should result in a high quality system that meets or exceeds customer expectations, within time and cost estimates, works effectively and efficiently in the current and planned IT infrastructure, and is cheap to maintain and cost-effective to enhance.
- Systems engineering is an interdisciplinary field of engineering that focuses on how complex engineering projects should be designed and managed.

== T ==
- Task is part of a set of actions which accomplish a job, problem or assignment.
- Tasks in project management are activity that needs to be accomplished within a defined period of time.
- Task analysis is the analysis or a breakdown of exactly how a task is accomplished, such as what sub-tasks are required
- Time limit is a narrow field of time, or a particular point in time, by which an objective or task must be accomplished.
- Timeline is a graphical representation of a chronological sequence of events, also referred to as a chronology. It can also mean a schedule of activities, such as a timetable.

== U ==
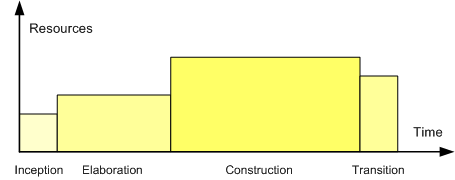
The Unified Process.

- Unified process: The Unified process is a popular iterative and incremental software development process framework. The best-known and extensively documented refinement of the Unified Process is the Rational Unified Process (RUP).

== V ==
- Value engineering (VE) is a systematic method to improve the "value" of goods and services by using an examination of function. Value, as defined, is the ratio of function to cost. Value can therefore be increased by either improving the function or reducing the cost. It is a primary tenet of value engineering that basic functions be preserved and not be reduced as a consequence of pursuing value improvements.
- Vertical slice is a type of milestone, benchmark, or deadline, with emphasis on demonstrating progress across all components of a project.
- Virtual design and construction (VDC) is the use of integrated multi-disciplinary performance models of design-construction projects, including the Product (i.e., facilities), Work Processes and Organization of the design - construction - operation team in order to support explicit and public business objectives.

== W ==
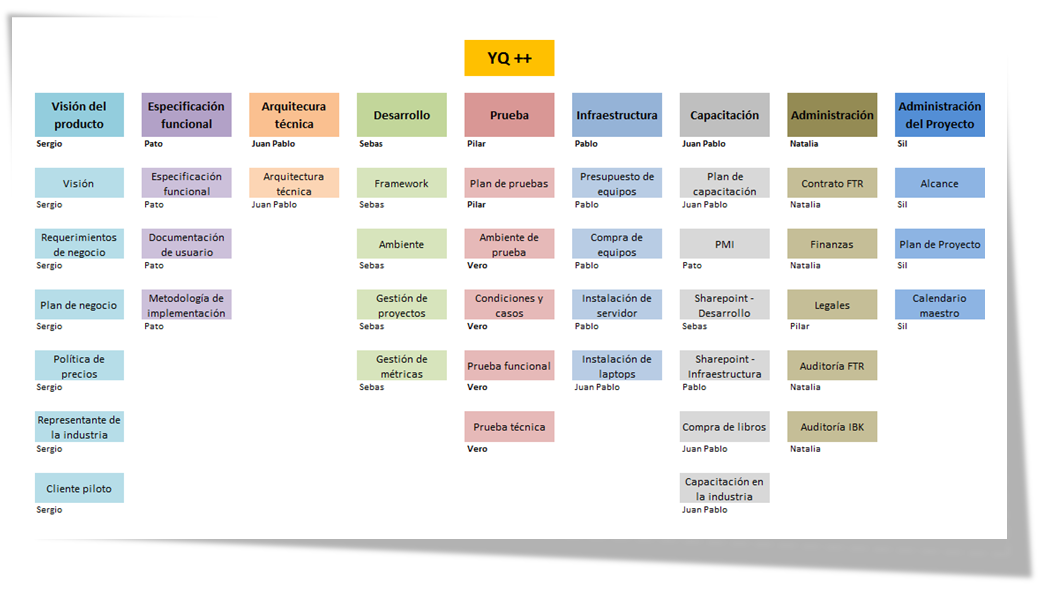
A work breakdown structure.

- Wideband Delphi is a consensus-based estimation technique for estimating effort.
- Work in project management is the amount of effort applied to produce a deliverable or to accomplish a task (a terminal element).
- Work breakdown structure (WBS) is a method and a kind of representation that defines a project and groups the project's discrete work elements in a way that helps organize and define the total work scope of the project. A Work breakdown structure element may be a product, data, a service, or any combination. WBS also provides the necessary framework for detailed cost estimating and control along with providing guidance for schedule development and control.
- Work package is a subset of a project that can be assigned to a specific party for execution. Because of the similarity, work packages are often misidentified as projects.
- Work stream is a set of associated activities, focused around a particular scope that follow a path from initiation to completion.

== Related lists ==
- List of production topics
- List of project management topics
- List of management topics
- List of Theory of Constraints topics
- List of topics in industrial organization
- Timeline of project management
- List of statistical tools used in project management
