= Outline of project management =

Overview of and topical guide to project management

The following outline is provided as an overview of and topical guide to project management:

Project management – discipline of planning, organizing, securing, managing, leading, and controlling resources to achieve specific goals. A project is a temporary endeavor with a defined beginning and end (usually time-constrained, and often constrained by funding or deliverables), undertaken to meet unique goals and objectives, typically to bring about beneficial change or added value. The temporary nature of projects stands in contrast with ongoing business operations.

== What type of thing is project management? ==
Project management can be described as all of the following:

- Management – in business and human organization activity is simply the act of getting people together to accomplish desired goals. Management comprises planning, organizing, staffing, leading or directing, and controlling an organization (a group of one or more people or entities) or effort for the purpose of accomplishing a goal.
  - Management process – is a process of planning and controlling the performance or execution of any type of activity.
- Process – ongoing collection of activities, with inputs, outputs and the energy required to transform inputs to outputs.
- Project – A temporary endeavor undertaken to create a unique product, service, or result.

== Branches of project management ==
- Project portfolio management
- Program management
- Project risk management
- Project workforce management

== Project management by domain ==
- Construction project management concepts
  - Construction – in the fields of architecture and civil engineering, is a process that consists of the building or assembling of infrastructure. Far from being a single activity, large scale construction is a feat of multitasking. Normally the job is managed by the project manager and supervised by the construction manager, design engineer, construction engineer or project architect.
    - Construction management
  - Architectural engineering
  - Virtual design and construction – (VDC) is the use of integrated multi-disciplinary performance models of design-construction projects, including the Product (i.e., facilities), Work Processes and Organization of the design - construction - operation team in order to support explicit and public business objectives.
- Software project management concepts
  - Software engineering – is the application of a systematic, disciplined, quantifiable approach to the development, operation, and maintenance of software.
  - Software development
    - Agile software development – is a set of principles about how software should be developed based on a rapidly iterative agile way of working in contrast to many previous software development methodologies.
  - Capability Maturity Model – (CMM) in software engineering is a model of the maturity of the capability of certain business processes. A maturity model can be described as a structured collection of elements that describe certain aspects of maturity in an organization, and aids in the definition and understanding of an organization's processes.
  - Dynamic Systems Development Method – (DSDM) is a software development methodology originally based upon the Rapid Application Development methodology. DSDM is an iterative and incremental approach that emphasizes continuous user involvement.
  - Unified Process – The Unified process is a popular iterative and incremental software development process framework. The best-known and extensively documented refinement of the Unified Process is the Rational Unified Process (RUP).

== Types of projects ==
- Mega project – is an extremely large-scale investment project.
- Expansion projects – Expansion of current operations or undertakings.
- Strategic projects
- R&D projects
- Customer projects
- Continuity projects
- Improvement projects

== Project management approaches ==
- Agile management
- Cadence project management methodology; other than a standard - the methodology is flexible and adaptable to the size, risk, and complexity of projects; recommends when and how to use which tools; is adaptable to company, institution, or sector.
- Critical chain project management (CCPM) – method of planning and managing projects that puts more emphasis on the resources required to execute project tasks.
- Event chain methodology – is an uncertainty modeling and schedule network analysis technique that is focused on identifying and managing events and event chains that affect project schedules.
- Extreme project management (XPM) – refers to a method of managing very complex and very uncertain projects.
- Lean project management - Lean concepts in a project management context.
- PMI (Project Management Institute) – project management standards and certification.
- IPMA (International Project Management Association) – project management standards, guidelines and certification.
- PRINCE2 – project management methodology and certification. The planning, monitoring and control of all aspects of the project and the motivation of all those involved in it to achieve the project objectives on time and to the specified cost, quality and performance.
- Process-based management

== Related fields ==
- Industrial engineering
- Cost engineering
- Facilitation (business)
- Project management software
- Project management simulation
- Resource allocation
- Scientific management
- Systems engineering
- Total cost management
- Workflow management

== History of project management ==
- Timeline of project management
- AACE International
- A Guide to the Project Management Body of Knowledge
- Booz Allen Hamilton
- Christopher Wren
- Critical Path Method
- Frederick Winslow Taylor
- Gantt chart
- Henri Fayol
- Henry Gantt – was an American mechanical engineer and management consultant, who developed the Gantt chart in the 1910s.
- Isambard Kingdom Brunel
- Karol Adamiecki
- Program Evaluation and Review Technique
- Project Management Institute
- Remington Rand
- Thomas Telford
- Trajan's Column
- Vitruvius
- Work breakdown structure

== Project management processes ==
Project management processes in the PMI framework are organized into five process groups: initiating, planning, executing, monitoring and controlling, and closing. Typical phases include:

1. Initiation
2. Planning and design
3. Execution and construction
4. Monitoring and controlling systems
5. Completion

== General project management concepts ==
- Dependency in a project network is a link amongst a project's terminal elements.
- Duration of a project's terminal element is the number of calendar periods it takes from the time the execution of element starts to the moment it is completed.
- Float in a project network is the amount of time that a task in a project network can be delayed without causing a delay to subsequent tasks and or the project completion date.
- Hammock activity – is a schedule (project management) or project planning term for a grouping of subtasks that "hangs" between two end dates it is tied to. (Or the two end-events it is fixed to.)
- Product breakdown structure – (PBS) in project management is an exhaustive, hierarchical tree structure of components that make up an item, arranged in whole-part relationship.
- Product description – in project management is a structured format of presenting information about a project product
- Project Management Triangle – is a model of the constraints of project management.
- Resources in project management terminology are required to carry out the project tasks. They can be people, equipment, facilities, funding, or anything else capable of definition (usually other than labour) required for the completion of a project activity.
- Scope of a project in project management is the sum total of all of its products and their requirements or features.
- Tasks in project management are activity that needs to be accomplished within a defined period of time.
- Time limit is a narrow field of time, or a particular point in time, by which an objective or task must be accomplished.
- Work in project management is the amount of effort applied to produce a deliverable or to accomplish a task (a terminal element).
- Vertical slice – is a type of milestone, benchmark, or deadline, with emphasis on demonstrating progress across all components of a project.
- Work package – is a subset of a project that can be assigned to a specific party for execution. Because of the similarity, work packages are often misidentified as projects.
- Workstream – is a set of associated activities, focused around a particular scope that follow a path from initiation to completion.

== Project management procedures ==
- Aggregate planning – is an operational activity which does an aggregate plan for the production process, in advance of 2 to 18 months, to give an idea to management as to what quantity of materials and other resources are to be procured and when, so that the total cost of operations of the organization is kept to the minimum over that period.
- Allocation – is the assignment of available resources in an economic way.
- Budgeting
  - Budget – generally refers to a list of all planned expenses and revenues.
  - Budgeted cost of work performed – (BCWP) measures the budgeted cost of work that has actually been performed, rather than the cost of work scheduled.
  - Budgeted cost of work scheduled – (BCWS) the approved budget that has been allocated to complete a scheduled task (or Work Breakdown Structure (WBS) component) during a specific time period.
- Constructability – is a project management technique to review the construction processes from start to finish during pre-construction phase. It will identify obstacles before a project is actually built to reduce or prevent error, delays, and cost overrun.
- Cost engineering – is the area of engineering practice where engineering judgment and experience are used in the application of scientific principles and techniques to problems of cost estimating, cost control, business planning and management science, profitability analysis, project management, and planning and scheduling."
- Critical path method – (CPM) is a mathematically based modeling technique for scheduling a set of project activities, used in project management.
- Earned value management – (EVM) is a project management technique for measuring project progress in an objective manner, with a combination of measuring scope, schedule, and cost in a single integrated system.
  - Earned schedule – (ES) is an extension to earned value management (EVM), which renames two traditional measures, to indicate clearly they are in units of currency or quantity, not time.
- Estimation in project management is the processes of making accurate estimates using the appropriate techniques.
- Graphical Evaluation and Review Technique (GERT) – is a network analysis technique that allows probabilistic treatment of both network logic and activity duration estimated.
- HERMES is a Project Management Method developed by the Swiss Government, based on the German V-Modell. The first domain of application was software projects.
- Kickoff meeting – is the first meeting with the project team and the client of the project.
- Linear scheduling method – (LSM) is a graphical scheduling method focusing on continuous resource utilization in repetitive activities. It is believed that it originally adopted the idea of Line-Of-Balance method.
- Program Management – is the process of managing multiple ongoing inter-dependent projects. An example would be that of designing, manufacturing and providing support infrastructure for an automobile manufacturer.
- Project accounting – Is the practice of creating financial reports specifically designed to track the financial progress of projects, which can then be used by managers to aid project management.
- Project Cost Management A method of managing a project in real-time from the estimating stage to project control; through the use of technology cost, schedule and productivity is monitored.
- Project planning – is part of project management, which relates to the use of schedules such as Gantt charts to plan and subsequently report progress within the project environment.
- Task is part of a set of actions which accomplish a job, problem or assignment.

== Project management tools ==
- BOSCARD – a strategic planning tool used in project management to give the Terms of reference for new projects.
- Event chain diagram – diagram that show the relationships between events and tasks and how the events affect each other.
- Gantt chart – is a type of bar chart that illustrates a project schedule. It illustrate the start and finish dates of the terminal elements and summary elements of a project. Terminal elements and summary elements comprise the work breakdown structure of the project.
- Integrated Master Plan – (IMP) is an event-based, top level plan, consisting of a hierarchy of Program Events.
- Milestones are tools used in project management to mark specific points along a project timeline.
- Project charter is a statement of the scope, objectives, and participants in a project.
- Project Management Simulators – are computer-based tools used in project management training programs. Usually, project management simulation is a group exercise. The computer-based simulation is an interactive learning activity.
- Project management software – is a type of software, including scheduling, cost control and budget management, resource allocation, collaboration software, communication, quality management and documentation or administration systems, which are used to deal with the complexity of large projects.
- Project network – is a graph (flow chart) depicting the sequence in which a project's terminal elements are to be completed by showing terminal elements and their dependencies.
- Project plan – is a formal, approved document used to guide both project execution and project control. The primary uses of the project plan are to document planning assumptions and decisions, facilitate communication among stakeholders, and document approved scope, cost, and schedule baselines. A project plan may be summary or detailed.
- Risk register – is a tool commonly used in project planning and organizational risk assessments.
- Schedules in project management consists of a list of a project's terminal elements with intended start and finish dates.
- Work Breakdown Structure (WBS) is a tool that defines a project and groups the project's discrete work elements in a way that helps organize and define the total work scope of the project. A Work breakdown structure element may be a product, data, a service, or any combination. WBS also provides the necessary framework for detailed cost estimating and control along with providing guidance for schedule development and control.

== Project-related problems ==
- Cost overrun – is defined as excess of actual cost over budget.
- Scope creep – refers to changes in a project's scope at any point after the project commenses. This phenomenon can occur when the scope of a project is not properly defined, documented, or controlled. It is generally considered a negative occurrence that is to be avoided.

The Systems Development Life Cycle.

== Project management standards ==
- ISO 10006 – guideline for quality management in projects, is an international standard developed by the International Organization for Standardization.
- PMBoK; Project Management Body of Knowledge, is the international standard for project management developed by the Project Management Institute PMI.
- APMBoK; Association for Project Management Body of Knowledge, developed by the APM (affiliated with the IPMA).

== Project participants ==
- Executive sponsor – : the senior member of the project board and often the chair.
- Project Management Professional – is a certificated professional in project management.
- Certified Project Management Professional
- Project manager – : professional in the field of project management. Project managers can have the responsibility of the planning, execution, and closing of any project, typically relating to construction industry, architecture, computer networking, telecommunications or software development.
- Project stakeholders – are those entities within or without an organization which sponsor a project or, have an interest or a gain upon a successful completion of a project.
- Project team – is the management team leading the project, and provide services to the project. Projects often bring together a variety number of problems. Stakeholders have important issues with others.
- Project management office –: The Project management office in a business or professional enterprise is the department or group that defines and maintains the standards of process, generally related to project management, within the organization. The PMO strives to standardize and introduce economies of repetition in the execution of projects. The PMO is the source of documentation, guidance and metrics on the practice of project management and execution.

== Project management education ==
=== Degrees ===
- Master of Science in Project Management
- Doctor of Project Management

=== Professional Certifications ===
- Project Management Professional
- Certified Associate in Project Management
- Certified Project Management Professional
- TOCICO Certified in Critical Chain Project Management

=== Schools ===
- RMIT School of Property, Construction and Project Management

== Project management organizations ==
- Association for Project Management
- Indian Institute of Project Management
- Theory of Constraints International Certification Organization
- Libyan Project Management Association
- Project Management Institute
- Project Management Research & Development Center
- Australian Institute of Project Management

== Project management publications ==
- A Guide to the Project Management Body of Knowledge

== See also ==
- Glossary of project management
- List of project management software
