= Outline of business management =

Overview of and topical guide to business management

The following outline is provided as an overview of and topical guide to business management:

Business management – management of a business – includes all aspects of overseeing and supervising business operations. Management is the act of allocating resources to accomplish desired goals and objectives efficiently and effectively; it comprises planning, organizing, staffing, leading or directing, and controlling an organization (a group of one or more people or entities) or effort for the purpose of accomplishing a goal.

For the general outline of management, see Outline of management.

== Overview ==
- Business administration – Administration of a commercial enterprise
- Business – Organization engaged in commerce or industry
- Corporate finance – Framework for corporate funding, capital structure, and investments
- Entrepreneurship – Taking financial risks in the hope of profit
- Outline of business – Overview of and topical guide to business
- Social entrepreneurship – Approach to develop, fund and implement solutions to social or environmental issues

== Types of organizations ==
Organization – Social entity established to meet needs or pursue goals

- Company – Association or collection of individuals
  - Corporation – Legal entity incorporated through a legislative or registration process
    - Nonprofit corporation – Legal entity that does not aim to earn profit
- Co-operative – Autonomous association of persons or organizations – Autonomous association of persons united voluntarily to meet their common economic, social, and cultural needs and aspirations through a jointly owned and democratically controlled enterprise
- Government – System or group governing an organized community
- Nonprofit organization – Organization operated for a collective benefit
  - Nonprofit corporation – Legal entity that does not aim to earn profit

== Areas of management application ==
Management application can be used by a person or a group of people and by a company or a group of companies depending upon the type of management skills being used. Management can be applied to every aspect of activity of a person or an organization:

=== Self-management skills ===
Self-governance is the act of conducting oneself to get things done. Effective management of oneself is a natural prerequisite of effective management. Personal skills related to business activity include:

- Managerial effectiveness – Capability of producing the desired result – getting the right things done. Peter Drucker reminds us that "effectiveness can and must be learned".
- Self-control – in the general sense, controlling one's own actions and states
  - Attention management – Study of directing and maintaining human attention
  - Stress management – Techniques and therapies to manage stress
  - Task management – Process of managing a task through its life cycle
  - Time management – Planning time spent on specific activities
- Self-employment – State of working for oneself
- Personal resource management
  - Personal information management – Tools and systems for managing one's own data
  - Personal knowledge management – Process by which a person manages knowledge
  - Personal finance – Budgeting and expenses

=== General organization management skills ===
- Agile management – Type of project management
- Asset management – Systematic method of maintaining assets
- Business administration – Administration of a commercial enterprise
- Change management – Management discipline studying human transformational processes within organizations
- Conflict management – Reducing workplace interpersonal conflict
- Conflict resolution – Facilitating a peaceful outcome to a dispute
- Constraint management – Management paradigm
  - Theory of constraints – Management paradigm
  - Focused improvement
  - Donella Meadows' twelve leverage points to intervene in a system – Systems Dynamics concept
- Corporate governance – Mechanisms, processes and relations by which corporations are controlled and operated
- Cost accounting – Procedures to optimize practices in cost efficient ways
- Crisis management – Process by which an organization deals with a harmful emergency
- Critical management studies (CMS) – Left wing approach to management, business and organization
- Customer relationship management – Process of managing interactions with customers
- Data management – Disciplines of managing data as a resource
- Design management – Field of inquiry in business
- Earned value management – Project management technique
- Human interaction management – Business management discipline
- Interim management – Temporary business management resources
- Knowledge management – Processing of knowledge to accomplish organizational goals
- Logistics – Management of the flow of resources
- Operations management – In business operations, controlling the process of production of goods
- Organization development – Study and implementation of techniques that affect organizational change
- Perception management – Influence tactic
- Planning – Regarding the activities required to achieve a desired goal
- Business process management – Business management discipline – Ensemble of activities of planning and monitoring the performance of a process, especially in the sense of business process, often confused with reengineering
- Program management – Process of managing several related projects
- Project management – Practice of leading the work of a team to achieve goals and criteria at a specified time
  - Outline of project management – Overview of and topical guide to project management
- Quality management – Business process to aid consistent product fitness
- Requirements management – Process of documenting and prioritizing requirements
- Resource management – Efficient and effective deployment of an organization's resources when they are needed
- Risk management – Identification, evaluation and control of risks management specialism aiming to reduce different risks related to a preselected domain to the level accepted by society. It may include numerous types of threats caused by environment, technology, humans, organizations, and politics.
- Security management – Computer security procedure
- Skills management – Developing the skills employees need
- Spend analysis
- Strategic management – Initiatives to enhance the performance of firms in external environments
- Strategic planning – Organizational decision making process
- Systems management – Enterprise-wide administration of distributed systems including computer systems
- Management science (MS) – Study of problem-solving in human organizations, The discipline of using mathematical modeling and other analytical methods, to help make better business management decisions.
- Nonlinear management (NLM) – Superset of management techniques and strategies that allows order to emerge by giving organizations the space to self-organize, evolve and adapt, encompassing Agile, Evolutionary and Lean approaches, as well as many others
- Operations management – In business operations, controlling the process of production of goods – Area of business that is concerned with the production of good quality goods and services, and involves the responsibility of ensuring that business operations are efficient and effective. It is the management of resources, the distribution of goods and services to customers, and the analysis of queue systems.
- Scientific management – Theory of management Theory of management that analyzes and synthesizes workflow processes, improving labor productivity.

=== Department management ===
- Accounting management – Field of business administration, part of the internal accounting system of a company
- Communications management – System of communication in an organization
- Engineering management
- Enterprise content management – Implementation of information technology management
- Financial management
  - Capital management – Management of capital assets and investments
  - Managerial finance – Application of financial principles to managerial decision-making
  - Outline of finance – Overview of finance and finance-related topics
- Human resource management – Approach to the effective management of people in a company
- Information technology management
- Enterprise legal management – Field of business administration on legal issues
- Marketing management – Practical application of marketing in organizations
- Procurement – Acquisition of goods and services
- Product management – Organizational role in companies
- Records management – Management of the information and records of an organization
- Supply chain management – Management of the flow of goods and services

=== Field- or organization-specific management ===
- Association management
- Community management
- Educational management – Administration of education systems
- Facility management – Interdisciplinary field
- Investment management – Professional asset management of securities for the benefit of investors
- Land management – Processes of managing land
- Public administration – Academic discipline; implementation or management of policy
- Restaurant management – Profession
- Talent management – Person or company that guides the career of an artist

== Business strategy ==
Strategic management – Initiatives to enhance the performance of firms in external environments

- Structure – Way in which an organization is structured
- Strategy – Discipline for achieving objectives against unpredictability, complexity, and ambiguity
- System – Interrelated entities that form a whole

=== Business analysis ===
Business analysis – set of tasks, knowledge, and techniques required to identify business needs and determine solutions to business problems. Solutions often include a systems development component, but may also consist of process improvement or organizational change.

- Competitor analysis – Corporate strategy

=== Goal setting ===
Goal setting – involves establishing specific, measurable and time targeted objectives

- Goal – or objective consists of a projected state of affairs which a person or a system plans or intends to achieve or bring about – a personal or organizational desired end-point in some sort of assumed development. Many people endeavor to reach goals within a finite time by setting deadlines.
  - Examples of business objectives
    - Competitive advantage – Attribute that allows an organization to outperform its competitors
      - Sustainable competitive advantage

=== Planning ===
Planning – in organizations and public policy is both the organizational process of creating and maintaining a plan; and the psychological process of thinking about the activities required to create a desired goal on some scale.

- Scheduling – Planning of tasks and events
  - Critical path method – Algorithm for scheduling a set of project activities
  - PERT –
- Strategic planning – Organizational decision making process
  - Business plan – Formal written document containing the goals of a business
    - Business process – Systematic collection of tasks within a business
    - Business Process Modeling – (BPM) Activity of representing processes of an enterprise, so that the current ("as is") process may be analyzed and improved in future ("to be")

=== Approaches ===
- Centralisation – Planning and decision making by a single authority
- Decentralization – Planning and decision making by various local authorities
- Developer relations
- Management by objectives
- Six Sigma – Business management strategy, originally developed by Motorola, that today enjoys widespread application in many sectors of industry
- Viable Systems Model

=== Feedback ===
- Financial statement – Formal record of the financial activities

=== Mistakes ===
- Analysis paralysis – Overthinking causes

== Concepts ==
- Balanced scorecard –
- Benchmarking –
- Board of directors –
- Business –
- Business intelligence –
- Business model – a profit-producing system that has an important degree of independence from the other systems within an enterprise.
- Business operations – are those ongoing recurring activities involved in the running of a business for the purpose of producing value for the stakeholders. They are contrasted with project management, and consist of business processes.
- Business process – is a collection of related, structured activities or tasks that produce a specific service or product (serve a particular goal) for a particular customer or customers. There are three types of business processes: Management processes, Operational processes, and Supporting processes.
- Case study – is a research method which involves an in-depth, longitudinal examination of a single instance or event: a case. They provide a systematic way of looking at events, collecting data, analyzing information, and reporting the results.
- Change control – the procedures used to ensure that changes (normally, but not necessarily, to IT systems) are introduced in a controlled and coordinated manner. Change control is a major aspect of the broader discipline of change management.
- Corporate image –
- Corporate structure
- Corporate title
- Costs – in economics, business, and accounting are the value of money that has been used up to produce something, and hence is not available for use anymore. In business, the cost may be one of acquisition, in which case the amount of money expended to acquire it is counted as cost.
- Critical success factor –
- Cross ownership –
- Cultural intelligence –
- Deliverable – contractually required work product, produced and delivered to a required state. A deliverable may be a document, hardware, software or other tangible product.
- Enterprise modeling – is the process of understanding an enterprise business and improving its performance through creation of enterprise models. This includes the modelling of the relevant business domain (usually relatively stable), business processes (usually more volatile), and Information technology
- Environmental scanning –
- Focused improvement – in Theory of Constraints is the ensemble of activities aimed at elevating the performance of any system, especially a business system, with respect to its goal by eliminating its constraints one by one and by not working on non-constraints.
- Fordism – named after Henry Ford, refers to various social theories. It has varying but related meanings in different fields, and for Marxist and non-Marxist scholars.
- Futures studies –
- Industrial espionage
- Industry or market research
- Innovation –
- Leadership –
- Lean manufacturing – or lean production, which is often known simply as "Lean", is the practice of a theory of production that considers the expenditure of resources for any means other than the creation of value for the presumed customer to be wasteful, and thus a target for elimination.
- Level of Effort – (LOE) is qualified as a support type activity which does not lend itself to measurement of a discrete accomplishment. Examples of such an activity may be project budget accounting, customer liaison, etc.
- Manufacturing –
- Marketing research –
- Middle management –
- Motivation – is the set of reasons that determines one to engage in a particular behavior.
- Operations research – (OR) interdisciplinary branch of applied mathematics and formal science that uses methods such as mathematical modeling, statistics, and algorithms to arrive at optimal or near optimal solutions to complex problems.
- Operations, see Business operations
- Organization development – (OD) planned, structured, organization-wide effort to increase the organization's effectiveness and health.
- Organization – social arrangement which pursues collective goals, which controls its own performance, and which has a boundary separating it from its environment.
- Poison pill –
- Portfolio – in finance is an appropriate mix of or collection of investments held by an institution or a private individual.
- Process architecture – structural design of general process systems and applies to fields such as computers (software, hardware, networks, etc.), business processes (enterprise architecture, policy and procedures, logistics, project management, etc.), and any other process system of varying degrees of complexity.
- Profit –
- Proport – combination of the unique skills of an organisation's members for collective advantage.
- Quality – can mean a high degree of excellence ("a quality product"), a degree of excellence or the lack of it ("work of average quality"), or a property of something ("the addictive quality of alcohol").[1] Distinct from the vernacular, the subject of this article is the business interpretation of quality.
- Quality, Cost, Delivery (QCD) as used in lean manufacturing, measures a businesses activity and develops Key performance indicators. QCD analysis often forms a part of continuous improvement programs
- Reengineering – radical redesign of an organization's processes, especially its business processes. Rather than organizing a firm into functional specialties (like production, accounting, marketing, etc.) and considering the tasks that each function performs; complete processes from materials acquisition, to production, to marketing and distribution should be considered. The firm should be re-engineered into a series of processes.
- Reverse engineering –
- Risk – is the precise probability of specific eventualities.
- Senior management –
- Shareholder value –
- Strategic sustainable investing – is an investment strategy that rewards companies that are moving society towards sustainability.
- Systems Development Life Cycle – (SDLC) is any logical process used by a systems analyst to develop an information system, including requirements, validation, training, and user ownership. An SDLC should result in a high quality system that meets or exceeds customer expectations, within time and cost estimates, works effectively and efficiently in the current and planned Information Technology infrastructure, and is cheap to maintain and cost-effective to enhance.
- Systems engineering – is an interdisciplinary field of engineering that focuses on how complex engineering projects should be designed and managed.
- Task analysis – is the analysis or a breakdown of exactly how a task is accomplished, such as what sub-tasks are required
- Timeline – is a graphical representation of a chronological sequence of events, also referred to as a chronology. It can also mean a schedule of activities, such as a timetable.
- Value engineering – (VE) is a systematic method to improve the "value" of goods and services by using an examination of function. Value, as defined, is the ratio of function to cost. Value can therefore be increased by either improving the function or reducing the cost. It is a primary tenet of value engineering that basic functions be preserved and not be reduced as a consequence of pursuing value improvements.
- Wideband Delphi – is a consensus-based estimation technique for estimating effort.

== Business management education ==
Business education – Teaching the skills and operations of the business industry – teaching students the fundamentals, theories, and processes of business.

- Business school – University-level institution teaching business administration – university-level institution that confers degrees in business administration or management. Such a school can also be known as "school of management", "school of business administration", or, colloquially, "b-school" or "biz school".
  - List of business schools – University-level institution teaching business administration
- Entrepreneurship education – Type of financial education
- Executive education – Academic programs at graduate-level business schools
- Managerial academic degrees
  - Undergraduate-level degrees
    - Bachelor of Business Administration – Academic degree
    - Bachelor of Commerce – Undergraduate degree in business
    - Bachelor of Business – Academic degree
    - Bachelor of Business Science
  - Graduate-level degrees
    - Master of Business Administration – Master's degree in business leadership
    - Master of Business and Management – Postgraduate business degree
    - Master of Business – Postgraduate university degree
    - Master of Commerce – Postgraduate academic degree
    - Master of International Business
    - Master of Management – Master's degree awarded for post-graduate study in business management
    - Master of Engineering Management – MEM
    - Master of Enterprise
    - Master of Finance – Graduate degree with a major in finance
    - Master of Nonprofit Organizations
    - Master of Health Administration – Academic degree
    - Master of Science in Project Management – Type of graduate degree
    - Master of Public Administration – Professional post-graduate degree in Public Administration – equivalent to an MBA, but for the public sector.
    - Master of Science in Management – Post-graduate degree
    - Professional Science Master's Degree – Interdisciplinary master's degree program
    - Sustainable MBA – Academic degree
  - Doctoral-level degrees
    - Doctor of Business Administration (DBA) – Doctorate of Business Administration
    - Doctor of Commerce (D.Com)
    - Doctor of Health Administration (D.H.A.)
    - Doctor of Management (D.M., D.Mgt) – Professional doctorate in management
    - Doctor of Public Administration (DPA) – Terminal applied-research doctoral degree
    - PhD in management (PhD) – Doctor of Philosophy, PhD
    - PhD-MBA – Double degree (double degree)

== People in business management ==
=== Management positions ===
- Business executive – Person responsible for running a business, or an aspect of it – person responsible for running an organization
  - Executive director – Managing director of an organization senior manager of an organization, company, or corporation
  - Executive officer – Officer who leads an organization; typically second to a commanding officer in militaries high-ranking member of a corporation body, government or military
  - Music executive – Person making executive decisions over artists of a record label person within a record label who works in senior management. Also known as a record executive.
  - Studio executive – Film studio employee
  - Executive producer – Profession
- Business manager – Occupation
  - Store manager – Person responsible for the day-to-day operations of a retail store
  - Senior management – Individuals at the highest level of organizational management
    - Chief executive officer (CEO) – Highest-ranking officer of an organization
    - Chief financial officer (CFO) – Person in a company or organization responsible for finances
    - Chief marketing officer (CMO) – Highest ranking executive-level position focusing on marketing
    - Chief security officer (CSO) – Company executive role
    - Chief information officer (CIO) – Information technology executive
    - General counsel – Chief lawyer of a legal department
    - Chief operating officer (COO) – Executive position
    - Chief procurement officer (CPO) – Highest level executive in charge of acquiring goods and services at a company
    - Chief revenue officer (CRO) – Corporate executive title
    - Chief technology officer (CTO) – Officer in charge of technical operations
    - Chief visionary officer (CVO) – Executive function in a company
    - Chief human resources officer (CHRO) – Corporate title
    - Chief learning officer (CLO) – Corporate title

=== Persons influential in business management ===
- Pioneers of management methods
  - Jack Welch – American business executive (1935–2020), implemented six sigma throughout General Electric, leading to its widespread adoption throughout industry.
  - Stafford Beer – British management consultant and cyberneticist, introduced management cybernetics to British steel industry and was responsible for the first use of computers in management.
- Business theorists
  - C. West Churchman – American philosopher and systems scientist
  - Peter Drucker – American management consultant and author (1909–2005)
  - Tom Peters – United States writer on organisation and employment

== See also ==
- Archive
- Outline of economics
- Outline of marketing – Overview of and topical guide to marketing
- Outline of production – Overview of and topical guide to production
- List of accounting topics
- List of business law topics
- What to manage:
  - Culture – Social behavior and norms of a society
  - Business – Organization engaged in commerce or industry
  - Economy – Area of production, distribution, trade of, and consumption of goods and services
  - Politics – Activities associated with group decisions
  - Science – Systematic endeavour to gain knowledge
  - Society – Connected group of individuals
  - Technology – Use of knowledge for practical goals
- Academy of Management Journal
- Anthony triangle – Organizational model
- Data management – Disciplines of managing data as a resource
- Human relations movement – Movement based on human relations
- Indian Ethos in Management
- Industrial and organizational psychology – Branch of psychology
- Leadership (journal)
- Management styles – Methods of maintaining order in a work environment
- Performance management – Processes to bring output into alignment with goals
- Project management – Practice of leading the work of a team to achieve goals and criteria at a specified time
- Strategic planning – Organizational decision making process
- Technology management – Design and control of technology products
- Team effectiveness – A team's ability to accomplish their goals or objectives
- Total quality management – Approach to business improvement
- Self-management – Form of organizational management
- Administration (law) – Rescue mechanism for insolvent entities (for administration of an insolvent)
- Board of directors – Type of governing body for an organisation
- Central administration
- Chairman – Leading or presiding officer of an organized group
- Charitable organization – Nonprofit organization with charitable purpose
- Chief executive officer – Highest-ranking officer of an organization
- Chief administrative officer – Corporate title
- Fundraising – Process of gathering donations
- Human resources – Organization's workforce
- Nonprofit organization – Organization operated for a collective benefit
- Private sector – Economic sector not under state control
- Public administration – Academic discipline; implementation or management of policy
- Public sector – Public part of the economy
- White-collar worker – Social class; person who performs intellectual labor
