= Outline of business =

Overview of and topical guide to business

The following outline is provided as an overview of and topical guide to business:

Business – organization of one or more individuals, engaged in the trade of goods, services, or both to consumers, and the activity of such organizations, also known as "doing business".

== Types of businesses ==
=== By legal structure ===
Types of business entity

- Sole proprietorship
- Partnership
- Corporation

== Business activities ==
- Accounting
- Commerce
- Finance
- Industrial and labour relations
- Management (outline)
- Manufacturing
- Marketing
- Research and development
- Supply Chain

== Concepts ==
- Advertising
- Banking
- Barter
- Big business
- Business acumen
- Business broker
- Business ethics
- Business hours
- Business intelligence
- Business mediator
- Business model design
- Business plan
- Business process modeling
- Business reference model
- Business rule
- Business schools
- Business trip
- Closure business
- Capitalism
- Change management analyst
- Commercial law
- Company
- Competition
- Competitive advantage
- Cooperative
- Core competency
- Corporate law
- Corporation
- Cost overrun
- Debenture
- Division business
- Ebusiness
- Economic democracy
- Economics
- Electronic business
- Electronic commerce
- Entrepreneurship
- Equity investment
- Financial economics
- Franchising
- Government ownership
- Growth platforms
- Human Resources
- Index of accounting articles
- Industry
- Insurance
- Intellectual property
- Interim Management
- International trade
- Investment (economics)
- Investment management
- Job creation program
- Labour economics
- Limited liability
- List of billionaires
- List of business theorists
- Lists of companies
- List of economists
- List of international trade topics
- List of oldest companies
- List of production topics
- List of real estate topics
- List of theory of constraints topics
- Management
- Management information systems
- Management philosophy
- Manufacturing
- Market forms
- Marketing plan
- Mass media
- Middle management
- Money
- Organizational studies
- Outline of business management
- Outline of commercial law
- Outline of economics
- Outline of finance
- Outline of marketing
- Outline of production
- Outline of project management
- Partnership
- Process management
- Profit (disambiguation)
- Project management
- Real estate
- Renewable Energy
- Revenue shortfall
- Senior management
- Small business
- Social responsibility
- Social security
- Strategic management
- Strategic planning
- Strategy dynamics
- Startup company
- Tax
- The Design of Business
- Theory of constraints
- Trade name
- Value migration

== Business scholars ==
- Peter Drucker
- Tom Peters

== Leaders in business ==
- Al-Waleed bin Talal
- Warren Buffett
- Elon Musk
- Andrew Carnegie
- Walt Disney
- Thomas Edison
- Michael Eisner
- Henry Ford
- Bill Gates
- J. Paul Getty
- Howard Hughes
- Steve Jobs
- Ray Kroc
- Li Ka-shing
- Lakshmi Mittal
- J. P. Morgan
- Rupert Murdoch
- Aristotle Onassis
- Amancio Ortega
- John D. Rockefeller
- J. R. Simplot
- Carlos Slim
- Ratan Tata
- Ted Turner
- Sam Walton
- Thomas J. Watson

== See also ==
- Outline of business management
- Outline of consulting
- Outline of finance
- Outline of management
