= CPMP =

CPMP may refer to:

- Committee for Proprietary Medicinal Products
- Certified Project Management Professional
- Core-Plus Mathematics Project
- Cyclic pyranopterin monophosphate or fosdenopterin
- Commissioning Process Management Professional (ASHRAE)
