= Enterprise project management =

Enterprise Project Management, in broad terms, is the field of organizational development that supports organizations in managing integrally and adapting themselves to the changes of a transformation. Enterprise Project Management is a way of thinking, communicating and working, supported by an information system, that organizes enterprise's resources in a direct relationship to the leadership's vision and the mission, strategy, goals and objectives that move the organization forward. Simply put, EPM provides a 360 degree view of the organization's collective efforts.

In recent years, with general adoption of (IT) governance practices, Enterprise Project Management has become more specific: whereas in the 1990s focus was generally on the management of the single project, in the subsequent decade, the focus lay more on the fact that a project is likely to be not the only one in the enterprise. The project co-exists with many other projects in the enterprise, or may be part of one or more programs. It may utilize (human) resources that are shared among other projects.

In order to facilitate governance, it has become essential to be able to manage, monitor, and assess the status of all projects (and other assets, of course) in the enterprise, through a set of (preferably uniform) Enterprise Project Management processes, methods and application packages. Typically, organizations that adopt an Enterprise Project Management way of working, might set up a Project Management Office (PMO)/ Enterprise Project Management Office (EPMO), which is said to be more successful than a traditional PMO in addressing the priorities of the organization as its scope is enterprise-wide), might select and adopt a Project Management Methodology like PRINCE2, PMBOK (or create a proprietary method) or follow the concepts of IPMA Competence Baseline as a foundation for development and certification of project managers and their knowledge, experience and behaviour. They might even select and implement a software system to support Enterprise Project Management.

An even more recent evolution in Enterprise Project Management is to not only plan and track the existing set of projects, but to create a portfolio (per budget size, per calendar year, per budget year, per business line, et cetera) of existing and future (demand) projects. This is called Project Portfolio Management. Just like the management of a portfolio of shares, Project Portfolio Management is the activity of selecting which projects to keep in portfolio (because of their anticipated value) and which ones to discard (because of their obsoleteness or because they will not yield the value that was initially calculated). Project Portfolio Management includes the creation of various scenarios to decide which is the best portfolio (for a certain year, business, budget, etcetera). Once the contents of the portfolio are agreed upon, it is key to constantly scrutinize how the individual projects are evolving in terms of quality, cost and schedule.

Implementing an Enterprise Project Management toolset needs to be considered in the light of the organization's Project Management Maturity and the methodologies, processes and governance structures that are currently in place. There are many consulting organizations that can support such implementations.

== See also ==
- Strategic enterprise management
- Project portfolio management
