= Scope statement =

In project management, scope statements can take many forms depending on the type of project being implemented and the nature of the organization. The scope statement details the project deliverables and describes the major objectives. The objectives should include measurable success criteria for the project.

== Overview ==
A scope statement should be written before the statement of work and it should capture, in very broad terms, the product of the project (e.g., "developing a software-based system to capture and track orders for software"). A scope statement should also include the list of users using the product, as well as the features in the resulting product. (Note: Nielsen, David (date unknown). How to Write the Project Statement of Work (SOW). Retrieved on 2010-03-22 from http://www.pmhut.com/how-to-write-the-project-statement-of-work-sow.)

== Contents ==
As a baseline scope statements should contain:

- The project charter
- The project owner, sponsors, and stakeholders
- The problem statement
- The project goals and objectives
- The project requirements
- A bill of quantities
- The project deliverables
- The project non-goals (what is out of scope)
- Milestones
- Cost estimates

In more project oriented organizations the scope statement could also contain these and other sections:

- Project scope management plan
- Approved change requests
- Project assumptions and risks
- Project acceptance criteria

The Project Management Institute (PMI) defines the project scope statement to include

- the description of the project scope,
- major deliverables,
- assumptions, and
- constraints.

and is part of the project scope baseline. (Note: A Guide to the Project Management Body of Knowledge, 5th Edition ISBN 978-1935589679, p. 131.)
