= Budgeted cost of work performed =

Budgeting and costing formula

Budgeted cost of work performed (BCWP) also called earned value (EV), is the budgeted cost of work that has actually been performed in carrying out a scheduled task during a specific time period. The BCWP is the sum of the budgets for completed work packages and completed portions of open work packages, plus the applicable portion of the budgets for level of effort and apportioned effort. (The items identified in the Work breakdown structure plus overhead costs, plus costs related in proportion to the planning and performance.)

According to the PMBOK (7th edition) by the Project Management Institute (PMI), Earned Value (EV) is defined as the "measure of work performed expressed in terms of the budget authorized for that work."

BCWP is a term in Earned value management approach to Project management.

BCWP is contrasted to Budgeted Cost of Work Scheduled (BCWS) also called Planned Value (PV). BCWS is the sum of the budget items for all work packages, planning packages, and overhead which was scheduled for the period, rather than the cost of the work actually performed.

BCWP is also contrasted to Actual Cost of Work Performed (ACWP) which measures the actual amount spent rather than the budgeted estimates.

== Example ==
To illustrate the difference between the three terms, assume that a schedule contains a task "Test hardware" estimated to run from 1 January to 10 January and to cost $1000, and that this is a simple effort with no overhead or allocated costs. However on 5 January, halfway through the time allowed, the work is 30% complete and has spent $250.

- BCWP is $1000 (budgeted cost) times 30% (work performed), or $300
- BCWS is $1000 (budgeted cost) times 50% (scheduled amount), or $500
- ACWP is $250

The comparison in Earned value management would view this as behind schedule and costing less overall than expected.

The detailed calculation should multiply % complete of each task (completed or in progress) by its planned value

== See also ==
- Glossary of project management
- Earned value management
