= Product description =

In the PRINCE2 project management method, a product description (PDD) is a structured format that presents information about a project product. It is a management product (document), usually created by the project manager during the process of initiating a project in the initial stage of the PRINCE2 project management method. It is approved by the project board as part of the project plan documentation.

It should not be confused with a project product description(PPD), which (in the PRINCE2 method) is generated in the start up process of the pre-project stage, and forms part of the Project Brief. While the PPD is related to "finalist products"—those delivered to the client at the end of the project—the PDD refers to all project products, including intermediate products necessary in the project life that need definition. For example, in a project to build a plane wing, the finalist product is the actual wing, and has acceptance criteria defined in the corresponding PPD. However, the project may require simulations, and even a wind-tunnel prototype and testing rig. Those are intermediate products, not handed or delivered to the client. However they are still subject to definitions and quality criteria that is detailed in the corresponding PDDs. Therefore, all product contained in the PPD are also in the PDDs, but not the other way.

The structure of product description, according to PRINCE2:

- Identifier
- Title
- Purpose
- Composition
- Derivation
- Format and presentation
- Development Skill Required
- Quality criteria
- Quality tolerances
- Quality method
- Quality skills required
- Quality Responsibilities

== See also ==
- List of project management topics
- Project plan
