= Lehman Review =

A Lehman Review is an independent peer review and evaluation of the status of a major construction project in the United States Department of Energy's (DOE's) Office of Science. Lehman Reviews evaluate all aspects of a construction project's current status, including technical aspects, cost, schedule and management, and they are usually held twice a year. Lehman Reviews are widely known in DOE, other agencies and abroad. The reviews are named after Daniel Lehman, Director of the DOE Office of Science's Office of Project Assessment since 1991.

== History ==
The Office of Project Assessment within the DOE's Office of Science provides independent advice relating to those activities essential to the construction and operation of major research facilities, as well as professional management and staff support regarding these functions. Within this mission, the office conducts independent technical, cost, schedule and management peer reviews of major construction projects, which include civil construction projects and the construction of large experimental equipment. While the Office of Science is exempt from DOE Order 413.3B, Program and Project Management for the Acquisition of Capital Assets for independent project and peer review, a Lehman Review will typically meet the requirements of the order. During a project's proposal and construction phase, Lehman Reviews are generally held twice a year, although a review may be held by request.

Lehman Reviews typically include dozens of independent technical experts. These experts may be divided into six or more subpanels to address all aspects of a project. A Lehman Review can potentially result in modifications to a project's cost, scope or schedule, and could also prompt work stoppage and management changes.

Some major projects that have been subject to Lehman Reviews within the DOE complex include the ongoing construction of the Facility for Rare Isotope Beams; construction of the Linac Coherent Light Source (LCLS) and subsequent construction of its upgrade at the SLAC National Accelerator Laboratory; the 12 GeV Upgrade of the Continuous Electron Beam Accelerator Facility at the Thomas Jefferson National Accelerator Facility; and construction of the User Support Building at the Advanced Light Source at Lawrence Berkeley National Laboratory. Other non- or non-exclusively DOE projects that have conducted reviews in the style of a Lehman Review include the construction project for the Fermi Gamma-ray Space Telescope, ITER and InterAction Collaboration Peer Reviews (conducted for CERN, TRIUMF and the United Kingdom's Science & Technology Facilities Council.

Before Lehman Reviews, peer reviews of major construction projects within DOE's Office of Science were called "Temple Reviews," named after Ed Temple, Director of the Construction Management Support Division in the Office of Energy Research (January 1980 - December 1990).

== See also ==
- Peer review
- Independent review
- Project management
- United States Department of Energy
- Office of Science
