= Project plan =

Formal, approved document used to guide both project execution and project control

A project plan is a series of structured tasks, objectives, and schedule to complete a desired outcome, according to a project manager's designs and purpose. According to the Project Management Body of Knowledge (PMBOK), a project plan is "...a formal, approved document used to guide both project execution and project control. The primary uses of the project plan are to document planning assumptions and decisions, facilitate communication among project stakeholders, and document approved scope, cost, and schedule baselines. A project plan may be summarized or detailed."

The latest edition of the PMBOK (v6) uses the term project charter to refer to the contract that the project sponsor and project manager use to agree on the initial vision of the project (scope, baseline, resources, objectives, etc.) at a high level. In the PMI methodology described in the PMBOK v5, the project charter and the project management plan are the two most important documents for describing a project during the initiation and planning phases.

The project manager creates the project management plan following input from the project team and key project stakeholders. The plan should be agreed and approved by at least the project team and its key stakeholders.

Many project management processes are mentioned in PMBOK Guide, but determining which processes need to be used based on the needs of the project, which is called "tailoring", is part of developing the project management plan.

== Purpose ==
The objective of a project plan is to define the approach to be used by the project team to deliver the intended project managers scope of the project.

At a minimum, a project plan answers basic questions about the project:

Why?
What is the problem or value proposition addressed by the project? Why is it being sponsored?
What?
What is the work that will be performed on the project? What are the major products/deliverables?
Who?
Who will be involved and what will be their responsibilities within the project? How will they be organized?
When?
What is the project timeline and when will particularly meaningful points, referred to as milestones, be complete?

== Plan contents ==
To be a complete project plan according to industry standards such as the PMBOK or PRINCE2, the project plan must also describe the execution, management and control of the project. This information can be provided by referencing other documents that will be produced, such as a procurement plan or construction plan, or it may be detailed in the project plan itself.

The project plan typically covers topics used in the project execution system and includes the following main aspects:

- Scope management
- Requirements management
- Schedule management
- Financial management
- Quality management
- Resource management
- Stakeholder management – New from PMBOK 5
- Communications management
- Project change management
- Risk management

== Details ==
The project plan document may include the following sections:

- Introduction: A high-level overview of the project.
- Project management approach: The roles and authority of team members. It represents the executive summary of the project management plan.
- Project scope: The scope statement from the Project charter should be used as a starting point with more details about what the project includes and what it does not include (in-scope and out-of-scope).
- Milestone list: A list of the project milestones (the stop points that helps evaluating the progress of the project). This list includes the milestone name, a description about the milestone, and the date expected.
- Schedule baseline and work breakdown structure: The WBS which consists of work packages and WBS dictionary, which defines these work packages, as well as schedule baseline, which is the reference point for managing project progress, are included here.
- Project management plans: This section contains all management plans of all project aspects.
- Change management plan
- Communication management plan
- Cost management plan
- Procurement management plan
- Project scope management plan
- Schedule management plan
- Quality management plan
- Risk management plan
- HR or staffing management plan
- Resource calendar: Identify key resources needed for the project and their times and durations of need.
- Cost baseline: This section includes the budgeted total of each phase of the project and comments about the cost.
- Quality baseline: Acceptable levels of quality.
- Sponsor acceptance: Some space for the project sponsor to sign off the document.

== See also ==
- Project planning
