= Project Management Research & Development Center =

Iranian research center

Management Research & Development Center is a research center within the National Iranian Petrochemical Company (NIPC). It was established in 2002 and does such activities as training, project management research, publication and so on. This center is located within the office complex of the NIPC in Tehran.
