= Hammock activity =

A hammock activity (also hammock task) is a schedule or project planning term for a grouping of tasks that "hang" between two end dates it is tied to.

A hammock activity can group tasks that are not related in the hierarchical sense of a Work Breakdown Structure, or are not related in a logical sense of a task dependency, where one task must wait for another.

Usage includes:

- Group dissimilar activities that lead to an overall capability, such as preparations under a summary label, e.g. "vacation preparation";
- Group unrelated items for the purpose of a summary such as a calendar-based reporting period, e.g. "First-quarter plans";
- Group ongoing or overhead activities that run the length of an effort, e.g. "project management".

The duration of the hammock activity (the size of the hammock) may also be set by the subtasks within it, so that the abstract grouping has a start date of the earliest of any of the subtasks and the finish date is the latest of any of the contents.

A hammock activity is regarded as a form of Summary activity that is similar to a Level of Effort (LOE) activity. Use of hammock activities is also a way to simplify the difficulties of performing Work Breakdown Structure decomposition to low levels. Also, hammock tasks can represent any group of tasks in the Integrated Master Schedule (IMS) regardless of their physical location or parent Work Breakdown Structure (WBS) element.
