= Project management office =

Department within a company or government

A project management office (usually abbreviated to PMO) is a group or department within a business, government agency, or enterprise that defines and maintains standards for project management within the organization. The PMO strives to standardize and introduce economies of repetition in the execution of projects. The PMO is the source of documentation, guidance, and metrics on the practice of project management and execution.

Darling & Whitty (2016) note that the definition of the PMO's function has evolved over time:

- The 1800s project office was a type of national governance of the agricultural industry.
- In 1939 the term "project management office" was used in a publication for the first time.
- The 1950s concept of the PMO is representative of what a contemporary PMO looks like.
- Today, the PMO is a dynamic entity used to solve specific issues.

Often, PMOs base project management principles on industry-standard methodologies such as PRINCE2 or guidelines such as PMBOK.

== Performance ==
There are many reasons for project failures. According to a PricewaterhouseCoopers survey of 1,524 organizations, inadequate project estimating and planning constitutes 30% of project failures, lack of executive sponsorship constitutes 16%, and poorly defined goals and objectives constitutes 12%. It also found that using established project management approaches increased success as measured by a project's key performance indicators of quality, scope, schedule, budgets and benefits. The survey indicates that operating an established PMO is one of the top three factors that drive successful project delivery.

Darling & Whitty (2016) found that there is a complexity of interconnections in PMO intellectual capital, and though often the rationale for PMO establishment is to enhance stakeholder satisfaction with projects, often the establishment of the PMO leads to significant dissatisfaction in senior management.

== Functions ==
A PMO may have other functions beyond standards and methodology, and may participate in strategic project management either as a facilitator or owner of the Portfolio Management process. Tasks may include monitoring and reporting on active projects and portfolios (following up project until completion) and reporting progress to top management for strategic decisions on what projects to continue or cancel.

The degree of control and influence that PMOs have on projects depends on the type of PMO. The three general types are:

- Supportive, with a consultative role
- Controlling, by requiring compliance for example
- Directive, by taking control and managing the projects

There are many opinions about what practices PMOs must fulfill. The PMBoK 5th edition dedicates a page and a half to such discussion, identifying 6 PMO functions. Hobbs & Aubry (2010) identify 27 distinct functions of PMOs, highlighting a number of these that were found to not correlate with enhanced project performance. Darling & Whitty (2016) state there is a need for evidence-based management practice, that consultants and practitioners are providing unproven solutions in which organizations both public and private are investing enormous quantities of finance without assured outcome. The publication of opinions without scientific basis in the field of science, medicine or law would not be tolerated, and it is equally important for justification to be presented in the management field.

Some PMOs operate in specialist contexts. In the Scaled Agile Framework the term APMO is used to define a PMO with a focus on supporting business agility.

PMO departments change frequently and for a variety of reasons. Research indicates that changes to portfolio management and methods, collaboration and accountability; project management maturity and performance; and work climate are all factors that drive PMO change.

Whilst PMO functions change through frequent transformations, it is argued that the core function of the PMO is to act as a catalyst for change and delivery within organizations.

== Types ==
There are a range of PMO types, including:

- Enterprise PMO: ensures that projects align with the organization strategy and objective; these have the broadest remit of all PMO types, typically reporting direct to the CEO (or similar role), and have authority to make strategic and tactical decisions across all projects.
- Divisional PMO: provides support to projects for a specific business unit within an organization; includes portfolio management, training, resource planning, and project coordination.
- Project PMO: established for the duration of a single large project or program; includes administrative support, controlling, reporting and monitoring.
- Project Management Center of Excellence (PMCoE): defines standardized project management standards, procedures, methods and tools to support project teams across an entire organization; includes administrative services and training in process, methodology, and tools.

The Project Management Institute (PMI) Program Management Office Community of Practice (CoP) describes the PMO as a strategic driver for organizational excellence, which seeks to enhance the practices of execution management, organizational governance, and strategic change leadership.

Darling & Whitty (2016) highlight that many PMO typologies have existed, from the early 1800s as a collective for running government strategy in the agricultural sector, to the civil infrastructure projects of the early 20th century, to the early 2000s when the PMO became a commodity to be traded upon. It would be impossible to group PMOs into specific types (Darling & Whitty, 2016).

Whilst the 'P' in PMO usually stands for "project," it can also refer to "program" or "portfolio." Where project management offices support projects, program management offices have a broader remit including getting and sustaining the benefits from projects/programs. Portfolio management offices have the added responsibility of supporting organizations in achieving strategic goals

== See also ==
- Project management
- Project management software
- Program management
- Enterprise project management
- Comparison of project management software
- Project Portfolio Management
- Document management system
