= Integrated master plan =

Program management tool

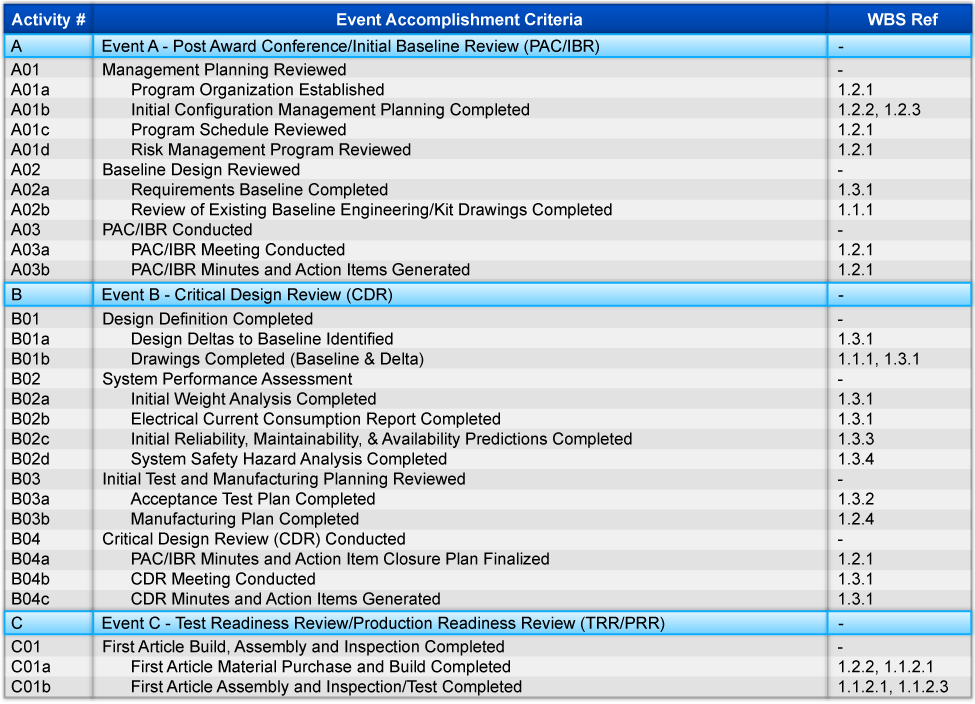
This example of an IMP shows a table of events, accomplishments, and criteria—without a listing of the IMP narratives. The intent is to illustrate the hierarchical structure and relationship of events, accomplishments, criteria, and tasks.

In the United States Department of Defense, the Integrated Master Plan (IMP) and the Integrated Master Schedule (IMS) are important program management tools that provide significant assistance in the planning and scheduling of work efforts in large and complex materiel acquisitions. The IMP is an event-driven plan that documents the significant accomplishments necessary to complete the work and ties each accomplishment to a key program event. The IMP is expanded to a time-based IMS to produce a networked and multi-layered schedule showing all detailed tasks required to accomplish the work effort contained in the IMP. The IMS flows directly from the IMP and supplements it with additional levels of detail——both then form the foundations to implement an Earned Value Management System.

- The IMP is a bilateral agreement between the Government and a contractor on what defines the “event-driven” program. The IMP documents the key events, accomplishments, and the evaluation "criteria" in the development, production and/or modification of a military system; moreover, the IMS provides sequential events and key decision points (generally meetings) to assess program progress. Usually the IMP is a contractual document.
- Supporting the IMP is the IMS that is made up of "tasks" depicting the work effort needed to complete the "criteria". It is a detailed time-driven plan for program execution that helps to ensure on-time delivery dates are achieved, and that tracking and status tool are used during program execution. These tools must show progress, interrelationships and dependencies.

In civic planning or urban planning, Integrated Master Plan is used at the levels of city development, county, and state or province to refer to a document integrating diverse aspects of a public works project.

== Purpose and Objectives ==
The primary purpose of the IMP—and the supporting detailed schedules of the IMS—is their use by the U.S. Government and Contractor acquisition team as the day-to-day tools for planning, executing, and tracking program technical, schedule, and cost status, including risk mitigation efforts. The IMP provides a better structure than either the Work Breakdown Structure (WBS) or Organizational Breakdown Structure (OBS) for measuring actual integrated master schedule (IMS) progress.

The primary objective of the IMP is a single plan that establishes the program or project fundamentals. It provides a hierarchical, event-based plan that contains: Events; Significant accomplishments; Entry and exit criteria; however it does not include any dates or durations. Using the IMP provides sufficient definition for explain program process and completion tracking, as well as providing effective communication of the program/project content and the "What and How" of the program.

== Rationale ==
The IMP is a collection of milestones (called "events") that form the process architecture of the program. This means the sequence of events must always result in a deliverable product or service. While delivering products or services is relatively straight forward in some instances (i.e., list the tasks to be done, arrange them in the proper sequence, and execute to this “plan”), in other cases, problems often arise: (i) the description of "complete" is often missing for intermediate activities; (ii) program partners, integration activities, and subcontractors all have unknown or possibly unknowable impacts on the program; and (iii) as products or services are delivered the maturity of the program changes (e.g., quality and functionality expectations, as well as other attributes)——this maturity provided by defining "complete" serves as an insurance policy against future problems encountered later in the program.

Often, it's easier to define the IMP by stating what it is not. The IMP is NOT BASED on calendar dates, and therefore it is not schedule oriented; each event is completed when its supporting accomplishments are completed, and this completion is evidenced by the satisfaction of the criteria supporting each of the accomplishments. Furthermore, many of the IMP events are fixed by customer-defined milestones (e.g., Preliminary or Critical Design Review, Production Delivery, etc.) while intermediate events are defined by the Supplier (e.g., integration and test, software build releases, Test Readiness Review, etc.).

The critical IMP attribute is its focus on events, when compared to effort or task focused planning. The event focus asks and answers the question what does done look like? rather than what work has been done. Certainly work must be done to complete a task, but a focus solely on the work hides the more important metric of are we meeting our commitments? While meeting commitments is critical, it's important to first define the criteria used for judging if the commitments are being met. This is where Significant Accomplishments (SA) and their Accomplishment Criteria (AC) become important. It is important to meet commitments, but recognizing when the commitment has been met is even more important.

== Attributes and Characteristics ==
The IMP provides Program Traceability by expanding and complying with the program's Statement of Objectives (SOO), Technical Performance Requirements (TPRs), the Contract Work Breakdown Structure (CWBS), and the Contract Statement of Work (CSOW)—all of which use the element names and reference numbering from the Customer's WBS as the shared list of elements for the IMS and all cost reporting. The IMP implements a measurable and trackable program structure to accomplish integrated product development, integrate the functional program activities, and incorporates functional, lower-level and subcontractor IMPs. The IMP provides a framework for independent evaluation of Program Maturity by allowing insight into the overall effort with a level-of-detail that is consistent with levied risk and complexity metrics. It uses the methodology of decomposing events into a logical series of accomplishments having measurable criteria to demonstrate the completion and/or quality of accomplishments.

== Requirements Flowdown ==
A Government customer tasks a Supplier to prepare and implement an IMP that linked with the IMS and integrated with the EVMS. The IMP list the contract requirements documents (e.g., Systems Requirements Document and Technical Requirements Document (i.e., the system specification or similar document)) as well as the IMP events corresponding to development and/or production activities required by the contract. The IMP should include significant accomplishments encompassing all steps necessary to satisfy all contract objectives and requirements, manage all significant risks, and facilitate Government insight for each event. Significant accomplishments shall be networked to show their logical relationships and that they flow logically from one to another. The IMP, IMS, and EVMS products will usually include the prime contractor, subcontractor, and major vendor activities and products.

== Evaluation of an IMS ==
When evaluating a proposed IMS, the user should focus on realistic task durations, predecessor/successor relationships, and identification of critical path tasks with viable risk mitigation and contingency plans. An IMS summarized at too high a level may result in obscuring critical execution elements, and contributing to failure of the EVMS to report progress. A high-level IMS may fail to show related risk management approaches being used, which can result in long duration tasks and artificial linkages masking the true critical path. In general, the IMP is a top-down planning tool and the IMS as the bottom-up execution tool. The IMS is a scheduling tool for management control of program progression, not for cost collection purposes.

An IMS would seek general consistency and a standardized approach to project planning, scheduling and analysis. It may use guides such as the PASEG Generally Accepted Schedule Principles (GASP) as guidance to improve execution and enable EVMS.

== Relationship to other Documents ==
The IMP/IMS are related to the product-based Work Breakdown Structure (WBS) as defined in MIL-STD-881, by giving a second type of view on the effort, for different audiences or to provide a combination which gives better overall understanding. Linkage between the IMP/IMS and WBS is done by referencing the WBS numbering whenever the PE (Program Event), SA (Significant Accomplishment), or AC (Accomplishment Criteria) involves a deliverable product.

== Reporting Formats ==
The IMP is often called out as a contract data deliverable on United States Department of Defense materiel acquisitions, as well as other U.S. Government procurements. Formats for these deliverables are covered in Data Item Descriptions (DIDs) that define the data content, format, and data usages. Recently, the DoD cancelled the DID (DI-MISC-81183A) that jointly addressed both the IMP and the IMS. The replacement documents include DI-MGMT-81650 (Integrated Master Schedule), DI-MGMT-81334A (Contract Work Breakdown Structure) and DI-MGMT-81466 (Contract Performance Report). In addition DFARS 252.242–7001 and 252.242–7002 provide guidance for integrating IMP/IMS with Earned Value Management.
