= HERMES method =

Project management method

HERMES 5 is a project management method for IT, services, products and business organisations and was developed by the federal administration of Switzerland. This method is an open standard available to all. Many cantons, cities, educational institutions and private sector companies have successfully introduced HERMES 5. HERMES 5 is an open eGovernment Switzerland Programme Office (eGov) standard, no. 0054 and is the standard in the Federal Administration for project management.

== Objectives and concept ==
HERMES 5 is a project management method which has been reduced to the essential elements and can be adapted to individual projects and organisations.

It provides full support with scenarios for concrete project processes, a web tool for methodical support, checklists and templates for efficient project management.

The method is a simple one and is understandable and does not address the methodologists, rather it addresses the project managers and those involved in the project. It contains clear task descriptions with activities, concrete role descriptions for cross-organisational cooperation and document templates for quick results. It allows an efficient and transparent approach to the project.

HERMES provides support to all of those involved in the project, i.e. the client with governance and sustainability, the project leader with planning, checking and management, the specialists with project execution, the core organisation in coordinating the project with the organisational goals.

The progress of the project is clear and manageable due to the four phases with the predefined milestones.

=== Scenarios ===
Each organisation has various projects which differ from each other in terms of their content and complexity. It is for this reason that HERMES provides various scenarios. Depending on the content of the project, the project leader selects a suitable scenario which can be individually adapted. HERMES provides a series of standard scenarios. These scenarios can be adapted according to the requirements of the organisation. The individual scenarios can be made available to other HERMES 5 users and can be recommended for validation to the eCH association.

=== Modules ===
Modules are reusable components for drawing up scenarios. Tasks, results and roles which topically belong together are grouped into a module. They serve as components for scenarios.

=== Phases and milestones ===
The four phases, initialisation, concept, realisation and introduction form the basis of this method. There is a milestone at the start and at the end of each phase.

=== Roles ===
The roles of client, project leader and technical specialist must be filled as a minimum requirement for the duration of the project. There is a description for each role including responsibility and allocation to a hierarchical level. The client role is always assigned to an individual.

=== Tasks and results ===
Results are generated using tasks. HERMES is structured in a results-oriented manner. Tasks and roles are assigned to the results.

== Background ==
This method was developed in 1975 and has been further developed with the active support of users and technical experts on a continuous basis.

HERMES has been used in Switzerland's Federal Administration since 1975 in the management and execution of IT projects. HERMES has been further developed over the years and underwent revisions in 1986, 1995, 2003 and 2005. HERMES 5 was launched in 2012.

== Training and certification ==
HERMES provides training for all interested parties from those who have done the basic course to project leaders. Certification is also available. Certification consists of two levels: foundation level for project employees and advanced level for project leaders.

=== HERMES Foundation ===
This level is designed for project staff who need to understand the basics of the HERMES method and how to apply it to their work. It covers topics such as:

- The HERMES framework and its phases
- Project planning and scheduling
- Risk management
- Quality management
- Communication and stakeholder management

The certification exam for the HERMES Foundation level consists of a multiple-choice test that assesses the candidate's knowledge of the HERMES method. To pass the exam, you must score 60% or higher.

=== HERMES Advanced ===
This level is designed for project managers who need to be able to lead and manage complex projects using the HERMES method. It covers topics such as:

- Advanced project planning and scheduling
- Resource management
- Procurement
- Change management
- Conflict resolution

The certification exam for the HERMES Advanced level consists of a multiple-choice test and a practical project management case study. To pass the exam, you must score 60% or higher on the multiple-choice test and receive a passing score on the case study.

=== HERMES Advanced Level (Recertification) ===
In addition to these two main levels, there is also a HERMES Advanced Level (Recertification) certification. This certification is designed for project managers who have already passed the HERMES Advanced Level certification and need to recertify their knowledge of the method.

To obtain recertification for HERMES Advanced, participants must fulfill the following requirements:

1. Provide proof of attending training and/or further education sessions on HERMES or project management (minimum of 20 units, each lasting 45 minutes), and
2. Demonstrate professional experience in a role related to leadership, control, execution, or knowledge transfer according to HERMES during the certification phase (including a description and confirmation from the employer/client).
