= Master of Science in Project Management =

Type of graduate degree

The Master of Science in Project Management (M.S.P.M.), also known as Master in Project Management (M.P.M.) is a professional advanced degree in project management. Such degree is not only for future project managers but also offers opportunities in consultancy, evaluation of investment projects, business analysis, business development, operations management, supply chain management, business administration, or any other area of Business administration or management. These Master programs usually provide general education revolving around business organization.

While programs may vary, most curricula are designed to provide professionals with the knowledge, skills and abilities to lead and manage effectively. Lecture and laboratory sessions require the application of critical thinking to problem solving within notional and actual situations. Students normally engage in the study of concepts, methodologies and analytic techniques necessary for successful leadership of programs/projects within complex organizations. Curricula typically focus on problem solving and decision-making using case studies, teaming exercises, hands-on applications, active participation, research and integrative exercises.

Candidates of M.P.M. programs are required to have at least an associate degree or Bachelor's degree from an accredited university, generally related to business administration or engineering. Most programs require 36-42 graduate credits and a thesis or final project.
