= Project charter =

Statement of the scope, objectives, and participants in a project

In project management, a project charter, project definition, or project statement is a statement of the scope, objectives, and participants in a project. It provides a preliminary delineation of roles and responsibilities, outlines the project's key goals, identifies the main stakeholders, and defines the authority of the project manager. According to the PMBOK Guide, the project charter formally authorizes the project, grants the project manager authority to use organizational resources, and includes high-level details such as project purpose, objectives, key deliverables, assumptions, constraints, and risks. More broadly, this document may be referred to as a "Team Charter" for the purpose of formalizing team roles and task structure at the outset of any team-oriented initiative. Research indicates that teams using charters to formalize roles and task structures at the outset tend to exhibit improved performance trajectories.

The name of this document varies by institution or methodology.

== Purpose ==
The project charter is usually a short document that explains a project clearly and concisely, and refers to more detailed documents for additional information. A project charter typically aims to:

- Identify the scope of the project.
- Provide a shared understanding of the project objectives.
- Act as an agreement between the project sponsor, key stakeholders, and the project team on roles and responsibilities.

A project charter typically documents most of the following:

- Project purpose or justification
- High-level objectives and success criteria
- Key deliverables and high-level requirements
- Assumptions and constraints
- High-level risks
- Summary milestone schedule
- Summary budget
- Key stakeholders
- Project manager authority and responsibilities

=== Establishing authority ===
The project charter establishes the authority assigned to the project manager, especially in a matrix management environment. This formal authorization is a standard practice described in the PMBOK Guide.

== Uses ==
The project charter serves several key functions:

- It formally authorizes the project, enabling prioritization and approval (for example, by alignment with organizational strategy or return on investment).
- It provides a concise high-level summary for stakeholder communication, initial buy-in, and resource justification against competing demands.
- It acts as a baseline reference for scope management, change control, team meetings, and ongoing governance.

== Development ==
A project charter will be created in the initiating process group of a phase or a project at the very start. Developing the charter and identifying the stakeholders are the two main actions of the initiating process group. Typically a project manager takes the lead in developing the charter. The project manager will employ their expertise and experience to develop the charter, working with key stakeholders (customers and business sponsors), the PMO, subject matter experts inside and outside the organization, other units within the organization, and potentially industry groups or professional bodies. The project manager will employ facilitation techniques such as brainstorming, problem solving, conflict resolution, meetings, and expectations management to develop the charter.

Inputs to develop a charter can be:

- Project Statement of Work
- Business Case
- Agreements
- Assumptions
- Enterprise standards, industry standards, regulations and norms
- Organizational processes, assets and templates

The charter once signed will provide authority to the project manager to officially execute the project and employ organizational funds and resources to make the project successful.

For a large multi-phased project, the charter can be created for each individual phase. For example, there can be an initial charter during the Scope and Seek phase of a project, followed by a Planning charter and an Execution Charter during the build phase of the project.

== See also ==
- Project scope
