= Nonlinear management =

Linear management is the application of reductionism to management problems, often relying on the ability to predict, engineer and control outcomes by manipulating the component parts of a business (organization, operation, policy, process and so on). Business process reengineering (BPR) is a popular example of linear management at work. The key defining characteristic of linear management is that order is imposed – usually from above.

Nonlinear management (NLM) is a superset of management techniques and strategies that allows order to emerge by giving organizations the space to self-organize, evolve and adapt, encompassing Agile, "evolutionary" and "lean" approaches, flextime, time banking, as well as many others. Key aspects of NLM, including holism, evolutionary design or delivery, and self-organization are diametrically opposite to linear management thinking.

== Examples of nonlinear management at work ==
- Agile software development

== See also ==
- Flat organization
- Holacracy
- Hierarchical organization
- Workers' self-management
