= Earned schedule =

Earned schedule (ES) is an extension to the theory and practice of earned value management (EVM).

It has been stated that Earned Schedule provides a useful link between traditional Earned Value Analysis and traditional project schedule analysis -- a link that some say has been missing in traditional EVM theory.

== Earned schedule measures ==
Traditionally, EVM tracks schedule variances not in units of time, but in units of currency (e.g. dollars) or quantity (e.g. labor hours). Of course, it is more natural to speak of schedule performance in units of time, but the problems with traditional schedule performance metrics are even deeper. Near the end of a project -- when schedule performance is often a primary concern -- the usefulness of traditional schedule metrics is demonstrably poor. When a project is completed, its SV is always 0 and SPI is always 1, even if the project was delivered unacceptably late. Similarly, a project can languish near completion (e.g. SPI = 0.95) and never be flagged as outside acceptable numerical tolerance. (Using traditional SV as an exception threshold, it is not uncommon that an SPI > 0.9 is considered acceptable.)

To correct these problems, Earned Schedule theory represents the two measures SV and SPI in 2 separate domains: currency and time. They are named as SV($) and SPI($), to indicate they relate to currency; and SV(t) and SPI(t), to indicate they relate to time.

A stated advantage of Earned Schedule methods is that no new data collection processes are required to implement and test Earned Schedule; it only requires updated formulas. Earned Schedule theory also provides updated formulas for predicting project completion date, using the time-based measures.

== As emerging practice ==
As of 2005, Earned Schedule is designated as an "emerging practice" by the Project Management Institute. It was introduced in 2003 a seminal article "Schedule is Different" by Walter Lipke, in The Measurable News, the quarterly magazine of the College of Performance Management, of the Project Management Institute. Earned Schedule received a global recognition in the academic community when published in 2009
