= Certified Project Management Professional =

Certified Project Management Professional (CPMP) is a certification created by the National Project Management Association (NPMA) in Taiwan, R.O.C.

== See also ==
- Prince2
- Certified Associate in Project Management
