= Program management =

Process of managing several related projects

Program management deals with overseeing a group or several projects that align with a company’s organizational strategy, goals, and mission. These projects, are intended to improve an organization's performance. Program management is distinct from project management.

Many programs focus on delivering a capability to change and are normally designed to deliver the organization's strategy or business transformation. Program management also emphasizes the coordinating and prioritizing of resources across projects, managing links between the projects and the overall costs and risks of the program.

== Summary ==
Program management is used in many business sectors such as business transformation, change management, construction, engineering, event planning, health care, information technology, and artificial intelligence. In the defense sector, it is the preferred approach to managing large scale projects. Given major defense programs entail working with contractors, it is also called acquisition management, indicating that the government buyer acquires goods and services by means of contractors.

The program manager has an oversight of the purpose and status of the projects in a program. In program management, the manager supports all project-level activity by ensuring program goals are met at each milestone of the project. In addition, the program manager is ultimately responsible for execution of projects to include decision-making capacity that cannot be achieved at project level or by a project manager. Typically, the project manager uses the program manager as a sounding board for ideas and approaches to solving project issues that have program impacts. The program manager provides insight by actively seeking out such information from the project managers, although in large and/or complex projects, a specific role may be required.

== Program management skills ==
Core competencies for effective program managers include communication, collaboration, and analytical thinking, as outlined in professional standards such as the PMI Talent Triangle.

For a program manager, time management, problem solving and critical thinking are key skills needed to manage, plan, and execute multiple projects. Since a program manager is leading a project and working with others, leadership attributes, stakeholder management, and decision making are critical to project success.

To obtain the necessary skills to become an effective program manager, obtaining a certification will demonstrate that you have the required skill set. The available certifications to obtain this knowledge are Project Management Professional (PMP), Certified Associate in Project Management (CAPM), or PMI Agile Certified Practitioner (PMI-ACP). These various certifications can be obtained in many colleges and universities.

== Key factors ==
There are several key factors of program management which considerably differ from project management. In general, these fall under several categories and range from overall strategic vision, resource and change management, and benefits of completion. Program management deals with strategy of the company as opposed to a shorter term look in project management.

=== Alignment ===
The program must support a higher-level vision, goals, and objectives. These are set out in the program vision and blueprint, which defines the future state for the organization, sector or community that will be significantly changed. Individual projects align to a program set by the executive team. These projects can vary in scope, intent, and priority but all are part of the greater portfolio.

=== Management ===
The program manager may be well placed to provide this insight by actively seeking out such information from the Project Managers although in large and/or complex projects, a specific role may be required. Program management necessitates consistent progress checks to ensure the projects are matching the portfolio’s direction. These checks should ensure accountability and confirm that stakeholders and suppliers are being utilized.

=== Program objectives ===
A program will deliver major change, whether it is within an organization, a sector or a community. As such, the management of change and transition is a key characteristic of a program, not just the building of a major capability. The program will adhere to set standards and incorporate planning, quality assurance, integration, and the eventual implementation. The planning phase brings together the various projects, resources, and milestones. Program changes and improvement go through a greater level of scrutiny compared to project management. Whereas a project might get approval for a change from its sponsor or director, a program level change would likely need executive approval. Quality assurance is pivotal to the success of each individual project and the success of the implementation.

=== Benefits ===
The key difference between a project and a program is that benefits are delivered within the program lifecycle compared to a project when they are delivered after the project has finished. These benefits in a program are felt as they are implemented and not when the project is rolled out to users. Successful program implementations are felt by the business affect all users in the organization.

== Comparison with project management ==
Program management and project management represent two fundamental approaches to achieving organizational change and success. While both are integral to an organization’s strategic execution, they differ significantly in their objectives, scope, and operational focus. Programs oversee and coordinate related projects to achieve broader organizational outcomes, whereas projects aim to deliver specific, tangible outputs within clearly defined parameters. Understanding these distinctions is essential for businesses to allocate resources effectively and align activities with strategic goals.

=== Key differences ===
==== Outputs vs. outcomes ====
Projects are designed to produce well-defined outputs. These outputs are discrete, measurable deliverables that contribute to a specific goal, such as constructing a new facility, implementing an IT solution, or launching a marketing campaign. These efforts are generally confined to meeting precise objectives that are critical to the organization's immediate needs.

Programs, by contrast, manage the interdependencies between multiple projects to deliver broader organizational outcomes. For instance, while a project might deliver a new hospital building, a program integrates this infrastructure with initiatives such as staff recruitment, training, and community outreach to enhance overall healthcare accessibility. This broader focus ensures that the strategic benefits extend beyond the sum of individual project outputs.

==== Scope and duration ====
The finite nature of projects is a defining characteristic. Each project operates within a fixed timeline and budget, with a clear start and end point. The deliverables of a project are specific, and its success is often measured by the extent to which it achieves its defined scope.

In contrast, programs are ongoing and adaptive. Programs encompass a series of related projects, evolving over time in response to organizational goals, external factors, and changing priorities. Programs often operate within an extended timeline, allowing for adjustments that maximize their strategic impact. For example, a corporate sustainability program might continuously add projects addressing renewable energy use or carbon footprint reduction.

==== Management focus ====
Project Managers are primarily concerned with the successful execution of their specific projects. Their focus is on delivering outputs that meet predefined standards of scope, cost, and quality. They oversee the project lifecycle from initiation through to completion, emphasizing efficiency, adherence to schedule, and budgetary constraints.

Program Managers, in contrast, take on a broader and more strategic role. They ensure that all projects under a program are aligned with organizational objectives and complement each other. Program managers must also address risks, resource allocation, and stakeholder expectations at a macro level. Their role involves monitoring the interdependencies between projects and adjusting optimize outcomes.

==== Measurements of success ====
In project management, success is assessed based on the delivery of outputs that meet specified criteria. A project is deemed successful if it achieves its objectives within the agreed time, budget, and scope. For example, a project to develop a new software application would be considered successful if the application functions as intended and is delivered on schedule.

Program management, on the other hand, evaluates success based on long-term strategic benefits and overall organizational impact. A program encompassing projects to reduce operating costs, for instance, would measure success by the extent to which these cost savings contribute to improved financial performance over time.

=== Theoretical perspectives ===
Different perspectives exist regarding the distinctions between programs and projects.

==== Outputs vs. outcomes perspective ====
Programs deliver outcomes that reflect strategic changes, whereas projects deliver outputs that meet specific, tactical needs. In this view, program managers ensure that all constituent projects collectively achieve desired end states, while project managers focus on completing their projects effectively.

==== Flexibility and adaptation perspective ====
Programs are more adaptable than projects, often evolving in response to changing conditions. Unlike projects, which adhere strictly to defined scopes, programs may shift priorities and allocate resources dynamically to maximize organizational benefits.

==== Practical implications ====
An organization’s approach to program and project management has significant implications for its operational and strategic success:

In launching a new product line, project management would oversee specific tasks such as market research, product design, and manufacturing setup. Each of these projects would have clearly defined outputs, such as a functional prototype or a marketing campaign.

Program management, by contrast, would ensure that all these projects align with broader organizational goals, such as increasing market share or achieving revenue growth. The program manager would address interdependencies, such as ensuring that production capabilities align with marketing timelines and sales targets.

=== Conclusion ===
Program and project management are complementary disciplines, each playing a vital role in achieving organizational success. Projects deliver outputs efficiently and effectively, while programs ensure that these outputs contribute to broader strategic outcomes. While the distinctions provide a useful framework, the practical application often depends on organizational culture, the complexity of the initiatives, and strategic priorities. Effective integration of both approaches is crucial for organizations aiming to achieve sustained growth and innovation.

== See also ==
- Cost overrun
- List of project management topics
- Project Management Institute
- Systems engineering
- Comparison of project management software
- Product manager
