= Scope (project management) =

Project management concept

In project management, scope is the defined features and functions of a product, or the scope of work needed to finish a project. Scope involves getting information required to start a project, including the features the product needs to meet its stakeholders' requirements.

Project scope is oriented towards the work required and methods needed, while product scope is more oriented toward functional requirements. If requirements are not completely defined and described and if there is no effective change control in a project, scope or requirement creep may ensue.

Scope management is the process of defining, and managing the scope of a project to ensure that it stays on track, within budget, and meets the expectations of stakeholders.

The term out of scope is used of matters that are not within the defined scope of the project and may be excluded from consideration (to maintain project focus and prevent mission creep).

== See also ==
- Cost overrun
- Requirements management
- Scope statement

== Bibliography ==
- Kerzner, Harold (2009). Project Management: A Systems Approach to Planning, Scheduling, and Controlling (10th ed.). Wiley. ISBN 978-0-470-27870-3.
- Sanghera, Paul (2019). PMP in Depth (Third ed.). Apress. doi:10.1007/978-1-4842-3910-0. ISBN 978-1-4842-3910-0.
