= Small-scale project management =

Small-scale project management is the specific type of project management of small-scale projects. These projects are characterized by factors such as short duration; low person hours; small team; size of the budget and the balance between the time committed to delivering the project itself and the time committed to managing the project. They are otherwise unique, time delineated and require the delivery of a final output in the same way as large-scale projects.

== Overview ==
Small-scale projects are by far the most common form of project enacted by institutions and large-scale organizations who may use small projects in order to accomplish a range of small-order tasks. For SME’s and micro-businesses, especially in the creative industries, the running of small projects may be an essential component of their core business. Individuals and groups regularly use small-scale projects as a means to delivering a range of outcomes from organizing a village fete to building a garden shed.

The balance between ‘process’ over ‘output’ is a key factor for consideration when looking at the effectiveness of applying project management methodologies to smaller projects. Other factors commonly associated with large-scale project management, for example time, cost and quality, still apply and broadly there are two approaches that can be taken:

- The adoption of a scaled-down version of PRINCE2 offers a flexible and reflexive approach to small-scale project management and limits the management burden while still enhancing the process. This methodology enables the project manager to use ‘lean project planning’ as a conceptual tool that can be configured to meet the requirements of small-scale projects in a variety of environments.
- AGILE is a risk driven approach that relies on an iterative cycle of review and evaluation. It limits the 'management overhead' to that which is useful for the project. The process allows for creative excursions and aims to deliver value outputs over shorter time-scales. The high level of flexibility in this approach is well suited to creative and experimental project environments.

== Quality management ==
The 'management overhead' describes the ratio between the effort required to document or manage a process and the eventual outcome of a project. With large-scale project methodologies the quality management is an important part of a project's process and aims to provide for continual improvement and a project output that meets the requirements of the end user. On small-scale projects it is not always possible to use standard quality management approaches due to limitations of time, budget and resources. There is still however a need to be creative and innovative while maintaining quality standards that, especially in the creative industries, maybe difficult to define or evaluate, and may defy simple categorization. It is important to recognize that quality is an innate characteristic that we instinctively recognize. We know quality when we see it but find ‘it’ hard to say what it is in advance. Insight, intuition and creativity are indicators of quality that on a small-scale project are perhaps better evaluated on an instinctive level i.e. "is it good enough". Any lightweight, lean or small-scale project management methodology must scale back process management and documentation to an optimum level. A level which does not overburden the project with unnecessary administration and does not commit scarce resources to a quality management approach that constricts the ability to be creative and innovate. A simple evaluation based on an elaboration of the question "is it good enough" may well suffice for the purpose of many small-scale projects.

== Creativity, innovation and implementation ==
"Innovation equals creativity plus implementation", where Creativity is a balance of "imagination and analysis", and implementation is a process of idea selection, development and commercialization. This suggests there is a requirement for a two phase solution for the implementation of small-scale projects. The first phase being one of problem definition, analysis, and critical thinking; followed by a second action or implementation phase where the prime activity is the application of skills and knowledge to implement the creative idea. The breaking down of the process of innovation into two fundamental stages offers the possibility for thinking about small-scale projects as a two-stage process, of innovation and innovation implementation.

== Scaling PRINCE2 ==
Small-scale projects process model adapted from Bentley, C. (2005) Managing Small Projects with PRINCE2, AMP Publishing

The use of flexible conceptual framework with integrated elements of the PRINCE2 methodology allows for the planning of small-scale projects to be structured a ‘work breakdown schedule’ using the general headings:

- What is to be produced
- When is it to be produced
- By whom will it be produced
- How is quality to be specified and measured
- A statement on technical resources
- Stage Descriptions (minimum of 2) – following natural breakpoints, critical components, milestones, checkpoints, reviews etc.
  - Creative and planning phase – leading to PID
  - Action or implementation phase – subdivided as appropriate

This process helps to outline the process of recording small projects through a PID in the context of project plan. The model aims to reduce administrative burden while being scalable for small businesses. The tools included in the process correspond to the stages of innovation and implementation process and may be tailored to a particular industry's needs.

== Managing project risk ==
Small-scale projects exception and change management tool adapted from Watson, M (2002) Managing Smaller Projects, Project Manager Today Publications

A simple risk assessment should be used in the planning process and team members can be encouraged to use it as a tool of critical inquiry that will help them identify risk factors and opportunities as part of a continual cycle offering a project a way of documenting its progress.

Any projects that have a degree of complexity in the implementation phase might need to further sub-divide this phase using milestones, or checkpoints that allow the team to see if it is on track and this process could be easily integrated into the risk assessment tool.

The adoption of a risk assessment tool will enable the project manager to deal with exceptions or changes to the project as they arise and enables a flexible approach to implementing the project. The key to a ‘reflexive’ approach to exception and change is the way in which ‘tolerance’ is applied to the project i.e. amount by which the Project Manager or Project Team may deviate from the project plan (in relation to time, cost and quality) without the need to refer up to the chain of command or initiate codified exception or change protocols.

Risk assessment can easily be combined with an exception planning procedure to manage tolerance to changes in a project. The use of ‘triggers’ to initiate exception management procedures in order to deal with issues such as scope creep; changes in aims and objectives; changes in constraints; and changes in risk. Such a tool offers a method for interrogating the project brief during the implementation phase and should be used as part of the planning and review process. The use of a numerical factor gives a simple scale that triggers a response in accordance with previously agreed criteria.

Thus the Project Manager is able to make judgements about change and can be given a degree of autonomy taking into account their level of experience.

== Adopting an agile approach ==
The Agile Manifesto:

"Individuals and interactions over processes and tools; creative solutions over comprehensive documentation; team working and collaboration over didactic formal organization; responding to change over following a plan".

Agile project management is risk & value driven i.e. an agile project plan need only address risks in relation to the projects values. The approach formulated by DeCarlo offers the following values as key to a 'sufficient methodology' for a projects success:

- People values: People first, honest communication, work life balance, have the courage to take risks.
- Process values: Ongoing client collaboration, fast failures by tackling risks early, high visibility and accountability.
- Business values: Clarity of purpose, focus on results not tracking, early delivery of business value.

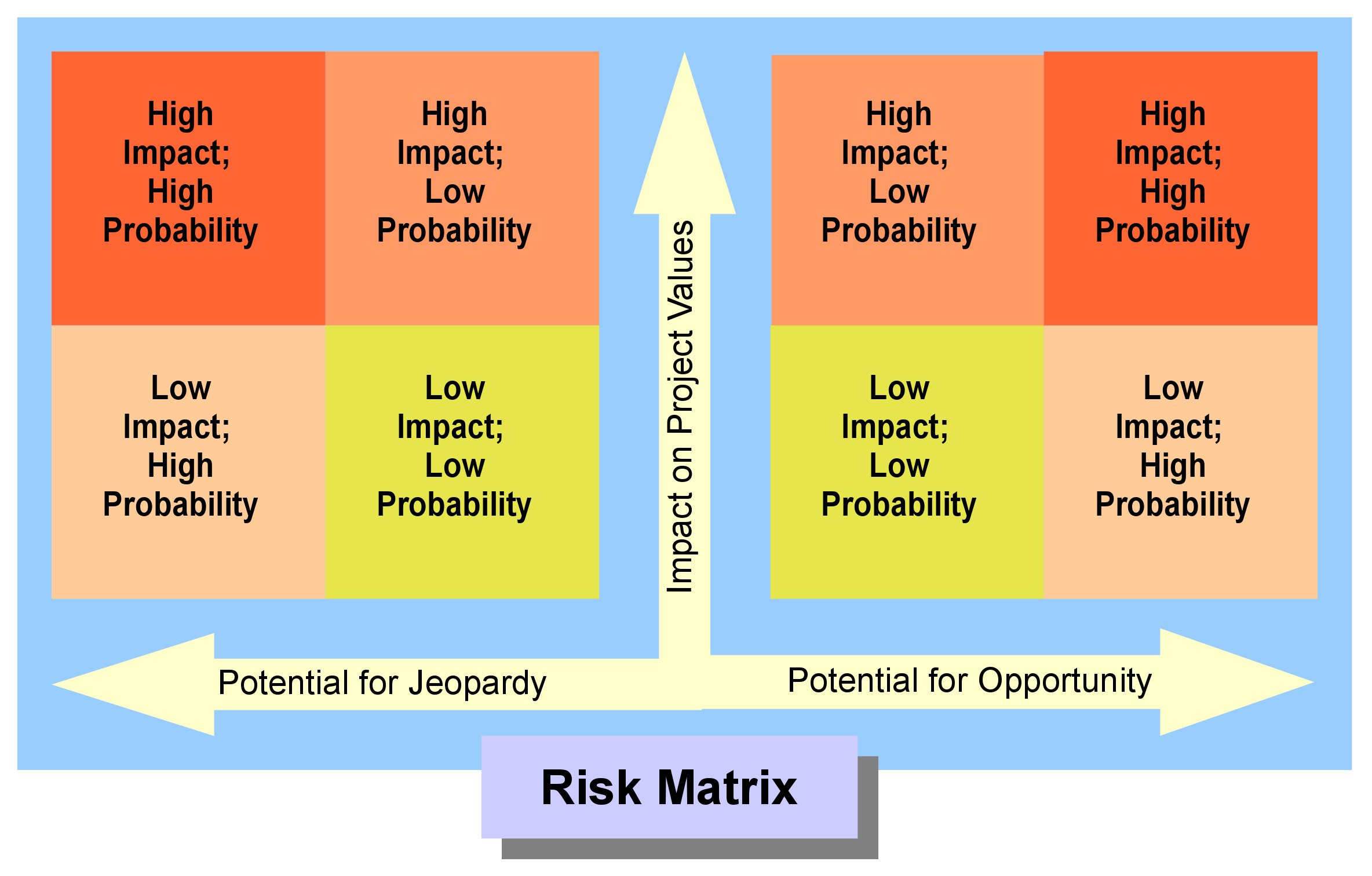
Small-scale projects opportunity risk matrix

There is a focus on learning in agile project management methodologies that uses iterative reflection as an organizational tool. Agile is about learning in real environments rather than by modeling and simulation. This is achieved by breaking the project into "time boxes" or stages sometimes referred to as "sprints". At the end of each 'time box" the project team review and evaluate using a risk tool asking what have we learnt from this stage and what will we now change. The PID after a review might change fundamentally according to what has been learnt.

Risk tools promote group discussion and reflection and are iterative across project life cycles or time boxes. A simple risk assessment may not suffice with an agile approach however as it only captures the negative or "jeopardy risks" excluding the "opportunity risks" . On creative or experimental projects the "opportunity risks" are of great importance since they may bring value to the project that had not been initially conceptualized.

At the completion of each iteration the project team might be required to use a simple tool such as a SWOT analysis as a risk register which captures both positive and negative risk attributes. After prioritizing this list the top three on the positive and negative categories on the risk register then become the actions for the next "time box". Risks can be dealt with following a simple mantra of "avoid/transfer/mitigate/enhance". In this way 'risk becomes the a structuring tool that keeps the project agile.

== Application ==
A template for a simple set of tools which are the optimum required for the management of a small-scale project would include:

- A two-stage approach to structuring a project which includes:
  - Critical, Creative, Innovation Phase
  - Process Driven Implementation Phase
- A three-page Project Initiation Document that fixes the project at the conclusion of the innovation phase including a:
  - Project Definition
  - Project Proposal
  - Project Plan
- A smoothing out or translation of complex technical jargon into appropriately user friendly terminology.
- A recognition that the process of reviewing and monitoring the project through use of structured meetings which reference the project documentation, is essential to the success of a project.
- The use of an 'Opportunity & Risk' assessment tool to promote critical enquiry into the project process.

A final issue of some importance is the need for underpinning support from the host institution or organization. The guidelines for applying PRINCE2 to small projects recommend that the institution within which the project is running should as an absolute minimum, provide a ‘Project Support Office’ to assist with the project's planning; to monitor progress on the part of the project board; to provide a quality assurance role; and provide an experienced but independent sounding board or mentoring role. This support role would enable the umbrella institution to ensure that the project properly represents the host institution's business and organizational objectives and could provide professional advice and support for inexperienced project teams. In cases where appropriate organizational support is in place, the adoption of a small-scale project management methodology such as the one proposed above will go someway towards enabling projects to run effectively and to deliver their outputs in terms of time, cost and quality.
