= Product-based planning =

Product-based planning is a fundamental part of the PRINCE2 approach to project management, and is a method of identifying all of the products (project deliverables) that make up or contribute to delivering the objectives of the project, and the associated work required to deliver them. The documents which define the Project itself are also considered Products.

== Overview ==
Product breakdown structure

Product-based planning is intended to ensure that all of the necessary products are identified and captured, and begins by identifying a product breakdown structure which is then repeatedly refined until all of the requisite products are identified. The PBS is thus a hierarchical family tree of all the products and sub-products that comprise the final end-product.
It is important to understand that in this context the term 'product' includes intermediate documentary products that are essential to the work of delivering the project. In this sense the product breakdown structure is a great deal more than simply an exploded view of the final end-product. Products included might also be products required to manage the project such as paper-based products and quality products such as approvals or quality checks on earlier made products. Examples include such things as requirement specifications, design approvals, test documentation, safety certifications, and so on.

Product flow diagram

Once a product breakdown structure has been created, work can then begin on creating a product flow diagram (PFD) (or product flowchart) which identifies the order of precedence of products and will typically include multiple and complex parallel paths. For practical purposes this flowchart is essentially the same as the PERT chart used for critical path scheduling and leads naturally to the development of a project schedule.

Work breakdown structure

With an understanding of the deliverables required, and the sequence in which they should be produced, work can then begin on defining the tasks required to produce them.

A significant advantage of product-based planning is the ability to surface critical assumptions and constraints. For example, if your project is to build another floor on top of a house, a required product will be the floor underneath on which to build the one you are commissioned to deliver. As a product you hope that it is there and will be fit for purpose but as you are not commissioned to deliver it, it falls outside your scope - and into your assumptions. In this way, by defining the whole product set necessary for the project, and not just those that are in your scope, you can surface and document the critical assumptions. Another advantage compared to activity-based planning has to do with reporting. Products are either finished or not, activities can be 90% finished for a long time even though work is taking place. One tends to forget things that have to be done to complete a project. This method captures them all, reducing the chance that any will be overlooked.

This method is used in PRINCE2, the UK's government mandated method for the management of major projects

== Example ==
A refrigerator is a final product with sub-products being door, shelves, heat exchange unit, fans, ice cube dispensers, lights, etc.

Each of the sub-products are made up of smaller products such as door handle, insulation, magnetic closure strip and internal covering.

== See also ==
- List of project management topics
- PRINCE2
- Managing stage boundaries
