= Project executive =

In project management, an executive or project executive is a person who has ultimate responsibility for a project, and is a role defined in the recognized project management framework PRINCE2. It is appointed by the customer during the start of the project and usually comes from the customer.

The project executive is the main decision maker, and designs and appoints the rest of the project management team, including the other members of the project board and the project management team (project manager, team leader(s)/sub-project manager(s), project assurance and project support).

== Structure ==
The project executive is supported by the roles of senior user on the customer side and senior supplier on the supplier side, respectively. The tasks of the project executive involve securing funding, being responsible for the project delivering a product that achieves the goals that were set, and that this happens in a cost-conscious manner.

The person must balance the requirements of the customer, the users and the supplier, and is responsible for the project justification (business case) throughout the project. The person acts as responsible for the profitability or delegates this responsibility, which often coincides with the project executive or senior user.

While the project manager is concerned with the daily running of a project, the project executive is concerned with the larger picture of a project, including monitoring the strategic program, project goals and project performance. A project executive is typically required for larger or more complex projects.

== Other names ==
The term project owner is sometimes used for describing the project executive. However, the term project owner is ambiguous, since it can refer to various different roles, such as the project sponsor, or a team including the sponsor, project champion and the owner's project manager, or simply the customer.

== See also ==
- PRINCE2
