= Global Alliance =

- Global Alliance Against Traffic in Women
- Global Alliance for Clean Cookstoves
- Global Alliance for EcoMobility
- Global Alliance for Genomics and Health (GA4GH)
- Global Alliance for Improved Nutrition
- Global Alliance for Information and Communication Technologies and Development
- Global Alliance for Preserving the History of WWII in Asia
- Global Alliance for Project Performance Standards
- Global Alliance for Rabies Control
- Global Alliance for TB Drug Development
- Global Alliance in Management Education
- Global Alliance of Affirming Apostolic Pentecostals
- Global Alliance of Leading-Edge Schools
- Global Alliance on Accessible Technologies and Environments
- Global ATM Alliance
