= P3M3 =

Management maturity model for portfolio, programme and project management

The Portfolio, Programme and Project Management Maturity Model (P3M3) is a management maturity framework used to assess and improve an organisation’s ability to manage projects, programmes, and portfolios. It provides a structured approach to benchmarking current practices, identifying strengths and weaknesses, and developing roadmaps for performance improvement.

P3M3 is maintained by AXELOS, a joint venture between the UK Cabinet Office and Capita, and is used by both public and private sector organisations globally.

== History ==
P3M3 was originally introduced in 2005 by the UK Office of Government Commerce (OGC) as an extension of the principles of the Capability Maturity Model (CMM) into project, programme, and portfolio management.

- 2005 – Initial release of P3M3.
- 2008 – Updated to version 2, expanding scope and detail.
- 2015 – P3M3 version 3 launched by AXELOS, adding a more granular assessment model.

== Structure ==
P3M3 is structured around three models, each focusing on a different domain of management maturity:

1. Portfolio Management Maturity Model (PfM3) – assesses how effectively an organisation manages investments, aligns them with strategic objectives, and realises benefits.
2. Programme Management Maturity Model (PgM3) – measures the organisation’s ability to coordinate multiple related projects to deliver strategic outcomes.
3. Project Management Maturity Model (PjM3) – evaluates the consistency, predictability, and repeatability of project delivery processes.

Each model is further assessed across seven perspectives, including organisational governance, resource management, stakeholder engagement, risk management, and benefits management.

== Maturity levels ==
P3M3 defines maturity across five levels, which represent increasing capability and predictability:

1. Level 1 – Awareness: Processes are unpredictable and reactive.
2. Level 2 – Repeatable: Some processes are established, but inconsistent.
3. Level 3 – Defined: Processes are standardised, documented, and communicated.
4. Level 4 – Managed: Performance is measured, controlled, and managed systematically.
5. Level 5 – Optimised: Continuous improvement and innovation are embedded in the organisation.

== Usage ==
Organisations use P3M3 to:

- Benchmark current maturity levels
- Identify areas for improvement
- Guide investment in project, programme, and portfolio management capabilities
- Demonstrate governance and assurance to stakeholders

The model is also applied in capability assessments, organisational transformation programmes, and in setting strategic roadmaps for delivery excellence.

== Relationship with other frameworks ==
P3M3 is complementary to other project and programme management frameworks, including:

- PRINCE2
- MSP (Managing Successful Programmes)
- MoP (Management of Portfolios)
- PMBOK Guide (Project Management Institute)
- CMMI

== Criticism ==
While P3M3 is widely regarded as a comprehensive framework for assessing maturity in project, programme, and portfolio management, several criticisms and limitations have been identified in both academic literature and practitioner experience:

- Limited empirical evidence of use: A study in Swedish engineering and construction firms found that although many maturity models are known, their application is often sparse, and the actual contribution of such models to organisational improvement is “somewhat unclear”.
- Ignoring structural/infrastructural factors: A comparative analysis observed that maturity models (including P3M3) often overlook physical infrastructure, tools, software, professional regulations, and other foundational elements.
- Lack of measures for effectiveness/efficiency: The same research noted an absence of processes in many maturity models for assessing whether best practices are being used efficiently or are yielding expected benefits.
- Dependency on senior sponsorship: Practitioner feedback indicates that for P3M3 assessments to be successful and meaningful, high-level sponsorship and a clear organisational “why” are critical. In firms where this is missing, assessments may be poorly implemented or not acted upon.
- Potential bias in assessment process: Issues such as selecting interviewees who will tend to give favourable feedback, or conversely, overly critical views, can skew results. A balanced cross-section of stakeholders and transparency in method are necessary.
- Variability across perspectives: Organisations often perform well in formal governance or financial control perspectives, but less well in areas such as stakeholder management, resource management, risk management, or benefits realisation.

== See also ==
- Project management
- Programme management
- Portfolio management
- Capability Maturity Model Integration
- PRINCE2
