= Cone of uncertainty =

Concept in project and disaster management

In project management, the cone of uncertainty describes the evolution of the amount of best case uncertainty during a project. At the beginning of a project, comparatively little is known about the product or work results, and so estimates are subject to large uncertainty. As more research and development is done, more information is learned about the project, and the uncertainty then tends to decrease, reaching 0% when all residual risk has been terminated or transferred. This usually happens by the end of the project i.e. by transferring the responsibilities to a separate maintenance group.

The term cone of uncertainty is used in software development where the technical and business environments change very rapidly. However, the concept, under different names, is a well-established basic principle of cost engineering. Most environments change so slowly that they can be considered static for the duration of a typical project, and traditional project management methods therefore focus on achieving a full understanding of the environment through careful analysis and planning. Well before any significant investments are made, the uncertainty is reduced to a level where the risk can be carried comfortably. In this kind of environment the uncertainty level decreases rapidly in the beginning and the cone shape is less obvious. The software business however is very volatile and there is an external pressure to decrease the uncertainty level over time. The project must actively and continuously work to reduce the uncertainty level.

The cone of uncertainty is narrowed both by research and by decisions that remove the sources of variability from the project. These decisions are about scope, what is included and not included in the project. If these decisions change later in the project then the cone will widen.

Original research for engineering and construction in the chemical industry demonstrated that actual final costs often exceeded the earliest "base" estimate by as much as 100% (or underran by as much as 50%). Research in the software industry on the cone of uncertainty stated that in the beginning of the project life cycle (i.e. before gathering of requirements) estimates have in general an uncertainty of factor 4 on both the high side and the low side. This means that the actual effort or scope can be 4 times or 1/4 of the first estimates. This uncertainty tends to decrease over the course of a project, although that decrease is not guaranteed.

== Applications ==
One way to account for the cone of uncertainty in the project estimate is to first determine a 'most likely' single-point estimate and then calculate the high-low range using predefined multipliers (dependent on the level of uncertainty at that time). This can be done with formulas applied to spreadsheets, or by using a project management tool that allows the task owner to enter a low/high ranged estimate and will then create a schedule that will include this level of uncertainty.

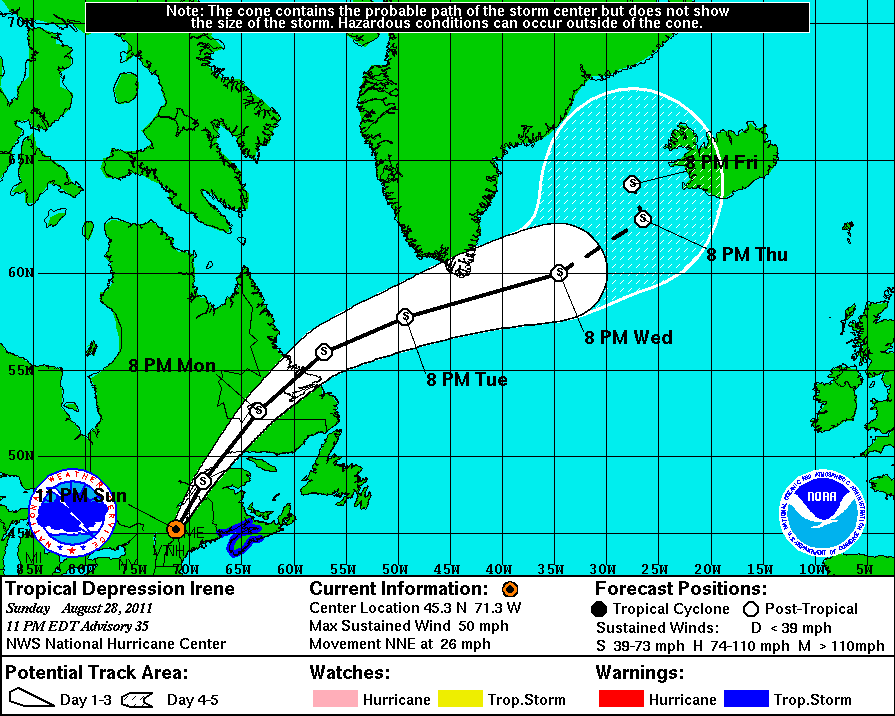
A projected three- and five-day path of Hurricane Irene, here downgraded to a tropical depression

The cone of uncertainty is also used extensively as a graphic in hurricane forecasting, where its most iconic usage is more formally known as the NHC Track Forecast Cone, and more colloquially known as the Error Cone, Cone of Probability, or the Cone of Death. (Note that the usage in hurricane forecasting is essentially the opposite of the usage in software development. In software development, the uncertainty surrounds the current state of the project, and in the future the uncertainty decreases, whereas in hurricane forecasting the current location of the storm is certain, and the future path of the storm becomes increasingly uncertain). Over the past decade, storms have traveled within their projected areas two-thirds of the time, and the cones themselves have shrunk due to improvements in methodology. The NHC first began in-house five-day projections in 2001, and began issuing such to the public in 2003. It is currently working in-house on seven-day forecasts, but the resultant cone of uncertainty is so large that the possible benefits for disaster management are problematic.

== History ==
The original conceptual basis of the cone of uncertainty was developed for engineering and construction in the chemical industry by the founders of the American Association of Cost Engineers (now AACE International). They published a proposed standard estimate type classification system with uncertainty ranges in 1958 and presented "cone" illustrations in the industry literature at that time. In the software field, the concept was picked up by Barry Boehm. Boehm referred to the concept as the "Funnel Curve". Boehm's initial quantification of the effects of the Funnel Curve were subjective. Later work by Boehm and his colleagues at USC applied data from a set of software projects from the U.S. Air Force and other sources to validate the model. The basic model was further validated based on work at NASA's Software Engineering Lab.

The first time the name "cone of uncertainty" was used to describe this concept was in Software Project Survival Guide.

== Implication ==
- Estimates (e.g. on duration, costs or quality) are inherently very vague at the beginning of a project
- Estimates and project plans based on estimations need to be redone on a regular basis
- Uncertainties can be built into estimates and should be visible in project plans
- Assumptions that later prove to be mistakes are major factors in uncertainty

== See also ==
- Tropical cyclone track forecasting
- Planning poker
- Software development effort estimation
