= ICEC =

ICEC may refer to:

Convention Center

Istanbul Lütfi Kırdar International Convention and Exhibition Center (Istanbul Lütfi Kırdar ICEC), a multi-purpose convention complex located in Harbiye neighborhood of Şişli district in Istanbul, Turkey.

Organizations

- InterCity East Coast, a railway franchise for passenger trains on the East Coast Main Line in the United Kingdom
- International Cost Engineering Council, non-profit organization that promotes cooperation between cost engineering, quantity surveying and project management organisations
- Independent Commission for Equity in Cricket, commission set up to investigate racial, gender and social equality in English cricket

Science and technology

- International Center for Electronic Commerce, international conference on electronic commerce
