= Fondomat =

- Website type: Crowdfunding
- Available in: English
- Commercial: Yes
- Launched: July 2011
- Current status: Offline

Fondomat was an online crowd funding platform founded in 2011 by Joe Wakeford and Conrad Watts, originally launched in Prague, Czech Republic before relocating to London, England

== History ==
Fondomat was the first crowd-funding website in the Czech Republic and at the time the only one to accept transactions in Czech Koruna. It subsequently relocated to England.

The company was dissolved in January 2015 with the founders moving on to run companies established using the crowdfunding methods originally employed by Fondomat.

== Operating model ==
The website handled the administration of charitable donations and the funding of individual projects, using online fundraising tools to promote projects via social networks while enabling the electronic collection of donations. The site supported funding in pound sterling (£) and euros (€).

Project owners chose a timeframe deadline and a funding target, and could add a description, videos and photos to their project page, or offer non-monetary rewards. Unlike some forums for fundraising or investment, the company did not claim any ownership over projects funded via its site, but took a 4% fee for fund-raising campaigns. The project owner was able to keep the funds collected whether or not the target was met by the deadline, unlike similar US site Kickstarter. The money raised was sent directly to the project owner, to protect them in case the platform collapsed.

== See also ==
- Comparison of crowd funding services
