= Project assurance =

Project assurance or programme assurance is a discipline that seeks to provide an independent and objective oversight of the likely future performance of major projects for those responsible for sanctioning, financing or insuring such undertakings. The discipline has emerged as a response to consistent problems in major projects and the need to provide confidence for project or programme stakeholders of technologically advanced, high capital or high risk projects.

Project assurance is in contrast with related disciplines such as project management, project benchmarking, value assurance or phase–gate model and project risk assessment. It is particularly well suited for projects with a major financial decision point beyond which revisions become exceptionally expensive.

The term has expanded in its use to a more complete solution. It is now recognised that the original approach of audits of hard disciplines (methods, tools, processes) and soft skills (leadership, people management) need to be extended to include elements such as the context, content and complexity of a project and its environment - with appropriate levels of granularity and precision – to identify critical success factors and barriers to success.

== Use ==
Project or programme assurance uses technical, strategic and contractual expertise to audit project plans and personnel and develop a forecast of likely technical, economic, and safety performance and critical success factors. Project assurance professionals typically serve and report to the board of directors of private companies and publicly held companies, governmental bodies, banking concerns (development, investment and commercial banks), insurance, surety companies, and any other entity that is responsible for project investments that often exceed $1 billion.

=== 8-step procedure ===
An eight-step assurance procedure was outlined in a 2013 paper produced by the BT Centre for Major Programme Management at the University of Oxford. The key features of this approach to project assurance are a critical review of the project plan and personnel by an expert independent organisation with expertise in benchmarking and project execution.

=== PRINCE2 ===
Project assurance is also recognised by PRINCE2 – a project management methodology, in an attempt to address the need in project organisation for monitoring all aspects of the project’s performance and products independently of the project manager. In practice, this involves a systematic review of project health through various frameworks and checklists to ensure that governance standards are being met without bias from the delivery team.

According to the Office of Government Commerce, project assurance helped manage risk and improved delivery confidence. Project assurance supported senior responsible owners (SROs) and others responsible for successful delivery whilst providing funders and other stakeholders with the confidence that the project could deliver to time, budget and quality. This they called the Project Assurance Function. The UK Government has also set up a project assurance organisation called the Major Projects Authority that works with HM Treasury to grow project assurance capabilities in Government and deliver project assurance services for high risk government-sponsored projects.

== Definitions ==
In the U.S., project or programme (U.S. spelling: program) assurance has been defined as:

An objective examination and independent assessment of a Capital Investment (Portfolio, Program, and/or Project) risks, controls, processes, and governance. Focus areas may include risk, financial, performance, compliance, system security, due diligence and/or dispute resolution engagements. Mega-Project Assurance would be specific to (Portfolios, Program, and/or Projects) that exceed $1 Billion in estimated investment value.

— John M. Cunningham

Another definition is:

The core concepts of Mega Project Assurance: risk is governable, leadership is accountable, cost must be properly managed and is recoverable, efficiency is attainable, fraud and waste are nearly preventable, and failure is unacceptable.

— John M. Cunningham

== See also ==
- Project risk management
