= International Cost Engineering Council =

The International Cost Engineering Council (ICEC) is a nonpolitical, nonprofit organization. ICEC’s objective is to promote cooperation between cost engineering, quantity surveying, and project management organizations. This is a global and local initiative to ensure the shared well-being of the organization and that of its members.

ICEC identifies itself as a Worldwide Confederation of Cost Engineering, Quantity Surveying, and Project Management Societies.

ICEC is an NGO in Roster Consultative Status with the Economic and Social Council of the United Nations.

== History ==
ICEC was founded in 1976 and now represents more than 100,000 cost engineers and project managers in over 100 different nations. Where subjects of common interest need to be exchanged and discussed, regular ICEC meetings are attended by delegates of the member societies. Each member society has one vote on the Council.

== Global Connections ==
ICEC is closely tied with the Pacific Association of Quantity Surveyors (PAQS) and the Africa Association of Quantity Surveyors (AAQS) and has Reciprocal agreements with the International Project Management Association (IPMA) and The Fédération Internationale Des Géomètres (FIG).

== ICEC Regions ==
The ICEC is divided geographically. The Regions are:

- Region 1 - North and South America;
- Region 2 - Europe
- Region 3 - Africa
- Region 4 - Asia Pacific.

== Congresses, Seminars, and Forums ==
=== Regional Meetings ===
ICEC regional meetings and congresses occur regularly, being held at least once a year. These meetings are usually held in conjunction with key regional events.

=== World Congress ===
The ICEC holds a World Congress once every two years. This is considered the flagship event of the Council in which member associations travel from around the world. This allows all involved to network, share information/ideas, and develop strategic plans for the ICEC organization.

== Membership ==
While ICEC does not permit individual membership, it does represent, collectively, more than 100,000 project cost management professionals from over 100 different nations. These members belong to various fields including Cost Engineering, Quantity Surveying, and Project Management. Comprising well over 40 professional associations spread throughout the world, it is considered an umbrella organization, representing project cost management associations on a global scale.

ICEC accreditation is available to ICEC Member Associations. These qualifications include; Cost Engineering, Quantity Surveying, and Project Management certification. It is also dedicated to the continuing professional development programs (CPD). All of these programs must meet ICEC standards before being recognized.

== Expertise ==
The expertise of ICEC members covers all Cost Engineering related activities.

- Cost Estimating
- Cost Control
- Planning and Scheduling
- Project Management
- Project Controls
- Business Planning & Management Science
- Profitability Analysis
- Quantity Surveying

== ICEC Journal and Newsletter ==
The ICEC International Cost Management Journal (ICMJ) is a peer reviewed online journal that features a collection of papers and articles that have been previously published in conference proceedings, symposia or journals produced by ICEC and ICEC member associations. It is a perpetual journal which allows papers to be submitted and included at any time. The ICMJ enables ICEC member associations to acknowledge contributions to their publications and conference proceedings. The journal effectively contains the papers/articles published around the world by member associations.

The ICEC publishes a biannual newsletter, titled “ICEC International Roundup Newsletter”. This includes news and reports about ICEC's activities, papers and news submitted by ICEC member associations as well as technical papers of interest. The newsletter is available in digital format via download from the ICEC Website.

== International Standards & Best Practice ==
ICEC has an ‘Inventory of Best Practice and Standards’. Drawn from a variety of different countries, the database is a listing of best practices and standards that have been developed for project cost management. This includes documents developed by ICEC member associations as well as independent standards prepared by other organisations. Examples of these would be the International Organization for Standardization (ISO), the International Project Management Organization (IPMA) and the Commission Electrotechnique Internationale (IEC).

== Worldwide Educational & Competency Standards ==
In order to assist other associations in the development and accreditation of their own education and certification programs, ICEC also provides a range of professional competency standards. These are developed by member associations for the purpose of sharing information about the various standards for cost engineering.

== See also ==
- AACE International
- Cost engineering
