= AACE =

AACE may refer to:

- AACE International (Association for the Advancement of Cost Engineering)
- American Association of Clinical Endocrinology
