= Project governance =

Management framework

Project governance is the management framework within which project decisions are made. Project governance is a critical element of any project since the accountabilities and responsibilities associated with an organization's business as usual activities are laid down in its organizational governance arrangements; seldom does an equivalent framework exist to govern the development of its capital investments (projects). For instance, the organization chart provides a good indication of who in the organization is responsible for any particular operational activity the organization conducts. But unless an organization has specifically developed a project governance policy, no such chart is likely to exist for project development activity.

Therefore, the role of project governance is to provide a decision making framework that is logical, robust and repeatable to govern an organization's capital investments. In this way, an organization will have a structured approach to conducting both its business as usual activities and its business change, or project, activities.

== Three pillars of project governance ==
The decision making framework is supported by three pillars:

=== Structure ===
This refers to the governance committee structure. In the first instance the Capital Expenditure Board sanctions resources (capital, human and other) to projects. Secondly, the portfolio committee ensures that the right projects are selected. As well as there being a Project Board or Project Steering Committee, the broader governance environment may include various stakeholder groups and perhaps user groups. Additionally, there may be a Programme, governing a group of related projects of which this is one, and possibly some form of portfolio decision making group. The decision rights of all these committees and how they relate must be laid down in policy and procedural documentation. In this way, the project's governance can be integrated within the wider governance arena.

The other governing bodies include the following:

- Functional Management responsible for the tactical governance of project team members and their work and deliverables
- Project team for operational governance of project resources and activities
- Review and auditing functions as independent process governance and deliverable and information quality
- Financial auditing for independent financial compliance auditing

=== People ===
The effectiveness of the committee structure is dependent upon the people that populate the various governance committees. Committee membership is determined by the nature of the project - other factors come into play when determining membership of programme and portfolio boards - which in turn determines which organisational roles should be represented on the committee.

=== Information ===
This concerns the information that informs decision makers and consists of regular reports on the project, issues and risks that have been escalated by the Project Manager and certain key documents that describe the project, foremost of which is the business case.

== Core project governance principles ==
Project governance frameworks should be based around a number of core principles in order to ensure their effectiveness.

=== Principle 1: Ensure a single point of accountability for the success of the project ===
The most fundamental project accountability is accountability for the success of the project. A project without a clear understanding of who assumes accountability for its success has no clear leadership. With no clear accountability for project success, there is no one person driving the solution of the difficult issues that beset all projects at some point in their life. It also slows the project during the crucial project initiation phase since there is no one person to take the important decisions necessary to place the project on a firm footing. The concept of a single point of accountability is the first principle of effective project governance.

However, it is not enough to nominate someone to be accountable – the right accountability for the success of the project is the subject of Principle 2.

=== Principle 2: Project ownership independent of Asset ownership, Service ownership or other stakeholder group ===
Often organisations promote the allocation of the project owner role to the service owner or asset owner with the goal of providing more certainty that the project will meet these owner's fundamental needs, which is also a critical project success measure. However, the result of this approach can involve wasteful scope inclusions and failure to achieve alternative stakeholder and customer requirements:

1. The benefit of the doubt goes to the stakeholder allocated with the project owner responsibility, skewing the project outcome;
2. Project owner requirements receive less scrutiny, reducing innovation and reducing outcome efficiency;
3. Different skill sets surround project ownership, Asset ownership and Service ownership placing sound project decision making and procedure at risk;
4. Operational needs always prevail, placing the project at risk of being neglected during such times;
5. Project contingencies are at risk of being allocated to additional scope for the stakeholder allocated project ownership.

The only proven mechanism for ensuring projects meet customer and stakeholder needs, while optimising value for money, is to allocate project ownership to specialist party, that otherwise would not be a stakeholder to the project. This is principle No. 2 of project governance.

The project owner is engaged under clear terms which outline the organisations key result areas and the organisation's view of the key project stakeholders. Often, organisations establish a Governance of Projects Committee, which identifies the existence of projects and appoints project owners as early as possible in a project's life, establishes Project Councils which form the basis of customer and stakeholder engagement, establishes the key result areas for a project consistent with the organisations values, and, oversees the performance of projects. These parameters are commonly detailed in a Project Governance Plan which remains in place for the life of the project (and is distinct from a Project Management Plan which is more detailed and only comes into existence during the development of the project).

Projects have many stakeholders and an effective project governance framework must address their needs. The next principle deals with the manner in which this should occur.

=== Principle 3: Ensure separation of stakeholder management and project decision making activities ===
The decision making effectiveness of a committee can be thought of as being inversely proportional to its size. Not only can large committees fail to make timely decisions, those it does make are often ill-considered because of the particular group dynamics at play.

As project decision making forums grow in size, they tend to morph into stakeholder management groups. When numbers increase, the detailed understanding of each attendee of the critical project issues reduces. Many of those present attend not to make decisions but as a way of finding out what is happening on the project. Not only is there insufficient time for each person to make their point, but those with the most valid input must compete for time and influence with those with only a peripheral involvement in the project. Further not all present will have the same level of understanding of the issues and so time is wasted bringing everyone up to speed on the particular issues being discussed. Hence, to all intents and purposes, large project committees are constituted more as a stakeholder management forum than a project decision making forum. This is a major issue when the project is depending upon the committee to make timely decisions.

There is no question that both activities, project decision making and stakeholder management, are essential to the success of the project. The issue is that they are two separate activities and need to be treated as such. This is the third principle of effective project governance. If this separation can be achieved, it will avoid clogging the decision making forum with numerous stakeholders by constraining its membership to only those select stakeholders absolutely central to its success.

There is always the concern that this solution will lead to a further problem if disgruntled stakeholders do not consider their needs are being met. Whatever stakeholder management mechanism that is put in place must adequately address the needs of all project stakeholders. It will need to capture their input and views and address their concerns to their satisfaction. This can be achieved in part by chairing of any key stakeholder groups by the chair of the Project Board. This ensures that stakeholders have the project owner (or SRO) to champion their issues and concerns within the Project Board.

=== Principle 4: Ensure separation of project governance and organisational governance structures ===
Project governance structures are established precisely because it is recognised that organisation structures do not provide the necessary framework to deliver a project. Projects require flexibility and speed of decision making and the hierarchical mechanisms associated with organisation charts do not enable this. Project governance structures overcome this by drawing the key decision makers out of the organisation structure and placing them in a forum thereby avoiding the serial decision-making process associated with hierarchies.

Consequently, the project governance framework established for a project should remain separate from the organisation structure. It is recognised that the organisation has valid requirements in terms of reporting and stakeholder involvement. However dedicated reporting mechanisms established by the project can address the former and the project governance framework must itself address the latter. What should be avoided is the situation where the decisions of the steering committee or project board are required to be ratified by one or more persons in the organisation outside of that project decision making forum; either include these individuals as members of the project decision-making body or fully empower the current steering committee/project board. The steering committee/project board is responsible for approving, reviewing progress, and delivering the project outcomes, and its intended benefits, therefore, they must have capacity to make decisions, which may commit resources and funding outside the original plan. This is the final principle of effective project governance.

Adoption of this principle will minimise multi layered decision making and the time delays and inefficiencies associated with it. It will ensure a project decision-making body empowered to make decisions in a timely manner.

=== Additional and complementary principles of governance ===
The board has overall responsibility for governance of project management. The roles, responsibilities and performance criteria for the governance of project management are clearly defined. Disciplined governance arrangements, supported by appropriate methods and controls are applied throughout the project life cycle. A coherent and supportive relationship is demonstrated between the overall business strategy and the project portfolio.

All projects have an approved plan containing authorisation points, at which the business case is reviewed and approved. Decisions made at authorisation points are recorded and communicated. Members of delegated authorisation bodies have sufficient representation, competence, authority and resources to enable them to make appropriate decisions. The project business case is supported by relevant and realistic information that provides a reliable basis for making authorisation decisions. The board or its delegated agents decide when independent scrutiny of projects and project management systems is required, and implement such scrutiny accordingly.

There are clearly defined criteria for reporting project status and for the escalation of risks and issues to the levels required by the organisation. The organisation fosters a culture of improvement and of frank internal disclosure of project information. Project stakeholders are engaged at a level that is commensurate with their importance to the organisation and in a manner that fosters trust.

=== Principles for multi-owned projects ===
Multi-owned is defined as being a project where the board shares ultimate control with other parties. The principles are:

- There should be formally agreed governance arrangements
- There should be a single point of decision making for the project
- There should be a clear and unambiguous allocation of authority for representing the project in contacts with owners, stakeholders and third parties
- The project business case should include agreed, and current, definitions of project objectives, the role of each owner, their incentives, inputs, authority and responsibility
- Each owner should assure itself that the legal competence and obligations and internal governance arrangements of co-owners, are compatible with its acceptable standards of governance for the project
- There should be project authorisation points and limiting constraints to give owners the necessary degree of control over the project
- There should be agreed recognition and allocation or sharing of rewards and risks taking into account ability to influence the outcome and creating incentives to foster co-operative behaviour
- Project leadership should exploit synergies arising from multi-ownership and should actively manage potential sources of conflict or inefficiency
- There should be a formal agreement that defines the process to be invoked and the consequences for assets and owners when a material change of ownership is considered
- Reporting during both the project and the realisation of benefits should provide honest, timely, realistic and relevant data on progress, achievements, forecasts and risks to the extent required for good *governance by owners
- There should be a mechanism in place to invoke independent review or scrutiny when it is in the legitimate interests of one or more of the project owners.
- There should be a dispute resolution process agreed between owners that does not endanger the achievement of project objectives.

== Roles ==
A key role in project governance is that of the project sponsor. The project sponsor has three main areas of responsibility which are to the board, the project manager and the project stakeholders.

=== The board ===
For the board, the sponsor provides leadership on culture and values, owns the business case, keeps the project aligned with the organisation's strategy and portfolio direction, governs project risk, works with other sponsors, focuses on realisation of benefits, recommends opportunities to optimise cost/benefits, ensures continuity of sponsorship, provides assurance and provides feedback and lessons learnt.

=== The project manager ===
For the project manager, the sponsor provides timely decisions, clarifies decision making framework, clarifies business priorities and strategy, communicates business issues, provides resources, engenders trust, manages relationships, and promotes ethical working.

=== Project stakeholders ===
For other project stakeholders, the project sponsor engages stakeholders, governs stakeholder communications, directs client relationship, directs governance of users, directs governance of suppliers and arbitrates between stakeholders.

== Elements ==
Project governance will:

- Outline the relationships between all internal and external groups involved in the project
- Describe the proper flow of information regarding the project to all stakeholders
- Ensure the appropriate review of issues encountered within each project
- Ensure that required approvals and direction for the project is obtained at each appropriate stage of the project.

Important specific elements of good project governance include:

- A compelling business case, stating the objects of the project and specifying the in-scope and out-of-scope aspects
- A mechanism to assess the compliance of the completed project to its original objectives
- Identifying all stakeholders with an interest in the project
- A defined method of communication to each stakeholder
- A set of business-level requirements as agreed by all stakeholders
- An agreed specification for the project deliverables
- The appointment of a project manager
- Clear assignment of project roles and responsibilities
- A current, published project plan that spans all project stages from project initiation through development to the transition to operations.
- A system of accurate upward status- and progress-reporting including time records.
- A central document repository for the project
- A centrally-held glossary of project terms
- A process for the management and resolution of issues that arise during the project
- A process for the recording and communication of risks identified during the project
- A standard for quality review of the key governance documents and of the project deliverables.

== See also ==
- Cost overrun
