= Project sponsorship =

Project sponsorship is the ownership of projects on behalf of the client organization.

There are two main differences between project sponsorship and project management. Firstly project sponsorship includes the identification and definition of the project whereas project management is concerned with delivering a project that is already defined, if only quite loosely. Secondly the project sponsor is responsible for the project’s business case and should not hesitate to recommend cancellation of the project if the business case no longer justifies the project.

Project sponsors can encourage separation of decision making responsibilities between project manager and project sponsor, accountability for the realisation of project benefits, oversight of the project management function and can carry out senior stakeholder management.

== Skills ==
The project sponsor or executive sponsor needs a range of skill sets, or at least access to skill sets which include appreciation of corporate strategy; ability to prepare a business case and profound knowledge of the organization’s operations. The project sponsor also needs to know his or her way around the organization and command respect within it. The project sponsor and project manager should form an effective partnership with the project manager orchestrating all players involved in delivering the project e.g. designers, manufacturers and contractors, whilst the project sponsor coordinates all departments of the client organization and associated stakeholders so as to integrate the delivered project into the client organization and take full benefits from it such that the business case is fulfilled.

Because the project sponsor is the ‘owner’ of the project from conception to commissioning and operation it is particularly important to achieve continuity of sponsor throughout the project yet correspondingly difficult to achieve because of the extended duration of sponsorship compared to project management.
