= Product flow diagram =

The product flow diagram (PFD) is a representation of the order by which a sequence of products is created according to product-based planning principles. It is related to the product breakdown structure (PBS).

The product flow diagram is a prescribed activity of the PRINCE2 project management methodology which mandates the use of product-based planning.

== Features ==
Some important features of the product flow diagram (PFD) include:

- The PFD is a planning aid, not an outcome of planning (like a PERT chart which looks similar), this is a common cause of confusion among the project managers
- The PFD should contain all the products of the product breakdown structure (equivalent to a work breakdown structure)
- The PFD should be kept as simple and high-level as possible for it to make sense (if additional detail is required, creating a supplementary, detailed product flow diagram can be useful)
- All products should be 'linked into' the product flow diagram, even if it's only to the start and the finish products
- Tt is vital not to get too 'hung up' on nuances such as the nature of each logical linkage in setting up a product flow diagram

The product flow diagram is typically created iteratively with product descriptions and the product breakdown structure because as a project manager works through the logic they will identify missing products and additional information about products.

== See also ==
- Product breakdown structure
- Work breakdown structure
