= Managing stage boundaries =

Managing Stage Boundaries is one of seven processes that make up PRINCE2, a systematic approach to project management developed by the UK's Office of Government Commerce and used widely in UK government and industry. The fundamental principle of Managing Stage Boundaries (SB) is to ensure that, at the end of each stage, the project stays focused on delivering business benefit.

== Description ==
Managing Stage Boundaries (SB) is one of seven processes outlined by PRINCE2. It is a decision point in the continuity of the project, from which the project will be either continued as planned, adjusted or stopped. The process involves reviewing the current stage (is the business case still valid, should we proceed to the next stage), preparing for the next one, and selecting information which can be of use later in the project.

The process is managed by the Project Manager, who informs the Project Board of the likelihood of success in attaining the project's business objective, project plan, together with associated risks and issues. If the Project Board is satisfied with the current stage end and the next stage plan, the project is permitted to continue. Managing Stage Boundaries is therefore a vital process in the management of the project. The objectives of the process are:

- To prove to the Project Board that all the products in the current stage are included and defined
- To provide the information required by the Project Board to assess if the project is still viable
- To obtain authorisation, and margins of tolerance, for the next stage
- To record any information or lessons which might be useful in later stages or in other projects

The products of the process (outputs) are:

- Current Plan actuals, used for showing the improvements from the original Stage Plan. The Stage Plan represents the basis of the Project Manager's day-to-day control and identifies in detail key deliverables, resource requirements and the total cost.
- Next Stage Plan, which represents the actual information stage with added facts and information, and forms part of the Project Board's assessment criteria for continuation of the project.
- Revised Project Plan. The Project Plan gives an overview of the total project, identifies key deliverables, resource requirements, the total cost, and major control points within the project, such as stage boundaries. It is used by the Project Board to measure the progress made and is revised and updated to reflect the latest understanding of the project.
- Updated Risk Log, provides identification, estimation, impact evaluation and countermeasures for all risks of the project. It is created during the start-up and developed during the life of the project and is used by the Project Board to check the viability of the project.
- Revised Business case. The Business Case is a part of the project mandate and is produced before the project is initiated. It includes the reasons for the project, expected business benefits, expected costs and expected risks. The ongoing viability of the project is monitored by the Project Board against this Business Case, which is updated with any new changes.
- Lessons Learned Report, describing lessons learned from any events occurring in each stage.
- Revised Project Management Team List This team comprises the entire management structure of Project Board, project manager, plus any Team Managers and project assurance roles. The team is checked and changes are updated if there are any.
- End Stage Report, given by the Project Manager to the Project Board and containing the results achieved during the stage.
