= Global Alliance for the Project Professions =

The Global Alliance for the Project Professions (GAPPS) is a nonprofit organization who provides independent reference benchmarks for project management standards and assessments. Driven entirely by volunteers, the GAPPS is an alliance of government, private industry, professional associations, and training and academic institutions working to develop globally applicable performance based competency standards for project management. The GAPPS produces standards, frameworks, and comparability maps (of other standards and frameworks) which are intended to facilitate mutual recognition of project management qualifications and are available for download, free of charge, from their website.

== Membership ==
GAPPS membership is open to any organization (public or private) or government agency and maintains a listing of current members on its website

Further, the GAPPS members are categorized into four distinct types:

- Standards & Qualifications Organizations
- Project Management Professional Associations
- Academic/Training Institutions
- Industry

== History ==
Beginning in the mid-1990s, people who were interested in the development of global project management standards began meeting, both formally and informally, during various project management conferences. In 1999, the International Project Management Association (IPMA) initiated a series of Global Working Parties, including one focused specifically on project management standards. The newly formed "standards working party met" at a number of project management conferences that featured international representation. During these meetings, number of initiatives were identified. One of these was the opportunity for the development of global performance based standards for project personnel that would complement existing knowledge based standards (such as the Project Management Institute’s A Guide to the Project Management Body of Knowledge, the Association for Project Management’s Body of Knowledge, International Project Management Association’s International Competence Baseline, and Japan’s Guidebook for Project and Program Management for Enterprise Innovation) and at the same time provide a basis for transferability and mutual recognition of project management qualifications.

The committee initiated development of global performance based standards for project managers, which, as a joint initiative of governments, professional associations, and corporations, provides an opportunity to:

1. Respond directly to the expressed needs of industry.
2. Enhance the profile and effectiveness of project management throughout the project management community, both globally and locally.
3. Increase support for project management as a field of practice and as an emerging profession.
4. Enhance the value and recognition of the performance based standards approach.

Following a Global Steering Committee meeting hosted by Services SETA of South Africa and held in London in August 2002, the first Working Session of the GAPPS (initially called Global Performance Based Standards for Project Management Personnel) was held in Lille, France, in February 2003. Attendees at this Working Session represented member organizations including major project professional organizations such as PMI, AIPM, Singapore Society of Project Managers and the Project Management Association of Japan, government standards bodies from Australia and South Africa, academic institutions and industry. Work of the GAPPS is largely produced by globally representative volunteers, in these three-day Working Sessions which are usually held three times a year.

== Objectives ==
According to the GAPPS website, their objectives are to:

1. Facilitate, develop, approve, publish, promote, maintain and review:
  1. global project management standards
  2. usage guidelines for project management standards, but
2. NOT consult, advise, express opinion or develop products based upon standards and guidelines
3. NOT provide training, assessment, certifications or qualifications to individuals based upon standards and guidelines

=== Approach to standards ===
The GAPPS "explicitly recognises" that there are many different approaches to project management that can achieve satisfactory results and that there are many different ways for project managers to develop their competence. The GAPPS standards for qualifications of Junior Project Manager (known as Global 1, or G1) and Senior Project Manager (known as Global 2, or G2) are quite generic, though this is intentionally so, as they are written as a complement to project management standards including those of professional associations (e.g. PMBOK®Guide, IPMA Competence Baseline and associated National Competence Baselines, APMBoK, P2M) as well as other standards such as BS6079 Guide to Project Management. All of these aforementioned documents can be used in association with the GAPPS to provide further detail, knowledge, and understanding of specific applications.

=== Adoption of standards ===
The GAPPS initiative encourages professional associations to consider adopting these standards to support existing standards and qualifications processes by adding and/or strengthening the performance based dimension. GAPPS also allows additions and modifications to be made to suit specific local and regulatory requirements. Standards and qualifications bodies are similarly encouraged to consider adopting the global performance based standards to facilitate transportability and mutual recognition of qualifications. Further, professional associations that do not have their own standards or qualifications are encouraged to adopt the standards and several associations have already begun this process.

Public and private organizations are encouraged to adopt the global standards as a basis for internal development and accreditation systems that will facilitate consistency across their global operations. This also applies to organizations that only operate locally but who are required to operate, source, and assess their project management personnel in an increasingly global marketplace, where assurance of the global relevance of qualifications is of value.

== Products ==
Since inception, the GAPPS has produced the following standards, research, and documents:

- Standards
  - Project Manager Standards
  - CIFTER Table for Evaluating PM Roles
  - Standards for Global 1 (Junior PM) and Global 2 (Senior PM)
  - Review commenced (to include Global Project Manager)
- Program Manager Standards
  - Six categories of Program Manager
  - ACDC Table for Program Manager Role Definition
- Mapping of Standards including
  - Australian Institute of Project Management Standards (AIPM)
  - Australian National Competency Standards for Project Management (ANCSPM)
  - International Project Management Association's (IPMA) Competence Baseline V3.0 (ICB®)
  - P2M
  - Project Management Institute's (PMI) PMBoK®Guide 2008
  - PRINCE2 2009
  - SAQA National Qualifications Level 5 Standard

In addition to the development of performance based standards (which can be used to complement existing knowledge based standards or in their own right) the GAPPS provides additional guidelines for their use in assessment and offers an Endorsed Provider program that provides assurance of equivalency between assessments.
