= AXELOS =

UK company set up in 2014

AXELOS is a joint venture set up in 2014 by the Government of the United Kingdom and Capita, to develop, manage and operate qualifications in best practice, in methodologies formerly owned by the Office of Government Commerce (OGC). PeopleCert, an examination institute that was responsible for delivering AXELOS exams, acquired AXELOS in 2021.

== Portfolio ==
AXELOS manages:

- ITIL (Information Technology Infrastructure Library) – IT Service Management
  published in 1989 (updated 2000, 2007, 2011 & 2019/20)
- PRINCE2 (Projects IN Controlled Environments) – Project Management
  published in 1996 (updated 1998, 2002, 2005, 2009 & 2017)
- MSP (Managing Successful Programmes) – Program Management
  published in 1999 (updated 2003, 2007, 2011 & 2020)
- M_o_R (Management of Risk) – Risk Management
  published in 2002 (updated 2007 & 2010)
- P3M3 or Portfolio, Programme and Project Management Maturity Model
  published in 2005 (updated 2008 & 2015)
- P3O (Portfolio, Programme and Project Offices)
  published in 2008 (updated 2013)
- MoV (Management of Value) – Value Management
  published in 2010
- MoP (Management of Portfolios) – Portfolio Management
  published in 2011
- RESILIA
  published in 2015
- PRINCE2 Agile – Agile Project Management
  published in 2015
- AgileSHIFT
  published in 2018

There are third-party training providers, but Axelos manages certification. In April 2014, AXELOS announced that it was also launching a cyber-resilience qualification; this would complement guidance available from CESG.

PeopleCert have been chosen by AXELOS as the sole EI (Examination Institute) for the delivery of Accreditation and Examination services worldwide, starting 1 January 2018.

== Background ==
The portfolio was originally developed for UK government, and is valuable; the government periodically requests tenders for private-sector partners to manage it. Historically, this had been APMG. However, in April 2013 Capita won the contract, under a new arrangement which required them to invest in a joint venture. Capita hold a 51% majority stake, the Cabinet Office the remaining 49%. This joint venture, AXELOS, was formed in July 2013, and it took over from APMG on 1 January 2014.

AXELOS was acquired by PeopleCert in July 2021.
