= Total cost management =

Total cost management (TCM) is the name given by AACE International to a process for applying the skills and knowledge of cost engineering. It is also the first integrated process or methodology for portfolio, program and project management. It was initially conceived by Thomas D. Fromm and John Nunnemaker of Perkins & Will, architects, in 1990 to apply to the design of the University of Illinois Life and Science Building and was presented as a concept to the Society of University and College Planners (SCUP) the following year. AACE first introduced the concept in the 1990s and published the full presentation of the process in the "Total Cost Management Framework" in 2006.

== Overview ==
Traditionally, the field of project management begins with the "initiation" of a project. The most well known treatment of the project management process is included in the Project Management Institute's Project Management Body of Knowledge (PMBOK). However, the PMBOK does not address what happens before a project is initiated; i.e., how does a project come into being?, how is the project identified and decided upon among other operating, maintenance, or investment options available to an enterprise. Total Cost Management maps the process upstream of project management. In TCM, what precedes project management is referred to as "strategic asset management" or more traditionally, "portfolio and program management". A unique element of the TCM process is that it integrates all the steps that an organization must take to deploy its business strategy. This includes monitoring and becoming aware of a performance issue with an asset in its asset portfolio (i.e., capital asset base), to completing a project and delivering a modified or new asset to the company's portfolio. It also addresses managing multiple projects as a program or project portfolio.

TCM has found its widest audience in the companies that make large capital investments in fixed capital assets through construction projects (e.g., oil and gas, chemical, pharmaceuticals, utilities, etc.). However, the process is industry generic and is finding wider use in IT, software and other companies.

== Total Cost Management Framework ==
In 2006, AACE published their Total Cost Management Framework – An Integrated Methodology for Portfolio, Program and Project Management. In this tested and proven methodology, portfolios of assets are optimized through the use of portfolios of projects, using project management as a delivery system, to support and enhance large, strategic or operational programs in support of the business and strategic objectives of the organization.

The TCM Framework is made freely available online for AACE members.
