= Global Alliance for Preserving the History of WWII in Asia =

Non-profit federation of organizations

Global Alliance For Preserving the History of WWII in Asia
- Website: http://www.global-alliance.net/

Global Alliance For Preserving the History of WWII in Asia is a non-profit, non-partisan federation of over 40 grassroots organizations dedicated to the remembrance, redress and reconciliation concerning World War II in Asia, also known as the Pacific War. It is concerned about crimes committed by the Imperial Japanese Army and issues related to them such as the Nanjing Massacre, Unit 731, Comfort women, Prisoners of War and Forced Labor. It aims to bring together such groups electronically, organizationally, and personally. This federation has become increasingly recognized as the leading organization safeguarding humanity and international justice with relation to World War II in Asia and the Pacific and its aftermath. It is also the first organization of its kind since previous similar groups were only focused on one or some aspects of the war.

== Mission and goals ==
Global Alliance's mission focuses on bringing about the closure of issues arising from Japan's aggression that led to World War II in Asia and the Pacific. It seeks justice for victims through punishment of those who never faced justice in the post war environment. Furthermore, it asks war reparations to be given to such victims.

Besides reparation and redress, members of Global Alliance seek to preserve and disseminate the events of the war. Revisionist theories have focused on the denial of such massacres as the Rape of Nanjing, and the events that took place during the war are largely unknown in Japan and the West. To address this issue, the organization has worked towards building a memorial museum in the U.S. similar to the United States Holocaust Memorial Museum to preserve the memory of atrocities during World War II. Finally, Global Alliance advocates expanded coverage of World War II history in the public school textbooks, and has promoted the inclusion of material on the Asian experience of the war.

== Beliefs ==
The federation believes that historical truth will bring about justice for victims and safeguard humanity from repeating the mistakes of the past. The following beliefs summarize Global Alliance's ideology:

- A full accounting of the Asia-Pacific War is imperative with relation to the Japanese Government’s factions that foster collective amnesia and ultra-nationalism, justifying and whitewashing Japanese war crimes
- Crimes against humanity were committed on a grand scale during this time period
- Victims are still seeking justice after nearly 60 years of the war’s end
- A nation who forgets the past is condemned to repeat its mistakes
- Embrace a feeling of sympathy and friendship with the people of Japan, for they too have been victims of Japanese militarism
- Transfer Confucius’ Golden Rule to an international scale: Nations shall not do unto other countries what they would not want others do unto themselves

== Demands ==
Based on the premise that the Government of Japan has to honor its post-war responsibilities, Global Alliance demands that through legislation enacted by the Diet of Japan, the Government of Japan must:

- Offer an official and unequivocal apology acknowledging the commission of atrocities in China, Korea, and other Asian states during the Asia-Pacific War
- Authorize full disclosure and preservation of documents relating to the mentioned events
- Mandate inclusion and teaching at all levels of schooling lessons of humanity learned from Japan's wars of aggression and its related war crime issues in the first half of the 20th century
- Provide just and due compensation to all identified surviving victims and surviving family members of the deceased victims, and victims whose properties were looted and/or destroyed
- Amend all statutory limitations under Japanese laws to make them non-applicable to war crimes and crimes against humanity committed by Japanese Imperial Forces during the Asia-Pacific War such that victims could seek due redress in the courts of Japan
- Provide funding for the creation of a memorial museum in Tokyo dedicated to: the commemoration and remembrance of war victims of the Asia-Pacific War, the preservation of documents declassified, research and publication of information pertaining to all facets of the war, educational outreach focusing on lessons learned through war crimes and related issues of this period, and to the efforts to bring closure to this war and to prevent future wars of aggression
- Outlaw public denial of war crimes committed by the Imperial Japanese Army
- Prosecute the living Japanese war criminals that have escaped international war crime trials after the end of the war, such as the International Military Tribunal for the Far East
- Remove relics of all war criminals now enshrined in the Yasukuni Shrine and prohibit honoring and worshiping of war criminals in that Shrine or any other religious establishments of national significance
- Establish a national day of remembrance for victims of the Asia-Pacific War
- Return all looted national treasures, including cultural and historical relics
- Honor the "military monetary certificates" issued by the Japanese occupational authorities for which people of victimized countries were forced to exchange their national currencies with due interest payment and adjustment for inflation

== Activities ==
- Link to affiliate websites in order to enhance communication and public education
- Espouse the study, research, and dissemination of historical truths regarding World War II
- Support exhibits on World War II and exhibits on war crimes committed by the Japanese army
- Lobby to promote legislation in the U.S. and elsewhere that will facilitate sue for redress for victims
- Organize conferences to call the world's attention to Japan's unresolved wartime issues
- Support efforts related to the redress movement of the survivors and victims of Japanese Asia-Pacific War atrocities
- Coordinate joint projects and activities related to Global Alliance's mission among member organizations
- Convene conferences on goal-related and mission-relevant subjects of importance

== Member organizations ==
Global Alliance is open to institutional membership, while individuals can join as non-voting supporters.

- Rape of Nanjing Redress Coalition (RNRC): An Organization founded in the U.S. by Asian Americans dedicated to bringing about appropriate and timely redress to victims of the Rape of Nanjing
- Alliance to Preserve the History of WWII in Asia - Los Angeles (ALPHA-LA):A group sharing the objective of preserving the history of World War II in Asia through public education.
- Association for Preserving Historical Accuracy of Foreign Invasions in China (APHAFIC): An association seeking to preserve the history of foreign invasions of China from the 19th century until the end of World War II.
- British Columbia Association for Learning & Preserving the History of WW II in Asia (B.C. ALPHA): Association based in Canada with the aim of preserving historical records of World War II in Asia and making the Japanese government acknowledge its role in the war.
- Hong Kong Reparation Association: Association based in Hong Kong seeking redress for the war crimes and the looting which this city was subjected to under Imperial Japan's occupation.
- Global Alliance China Chapter (RNRC): An Organization founded as part of the GA in the Greater China area by overseas Chinese Americans and Asian Americans dedicated to GA's mission to bring about appropriate and timely redress to victims of the Rape of Nanjing, Unit 731 Germ Warfare and "Comfort women".

== Newsletter ==
A newsletter is published by Global Alliance mostly in Chinese but occasionally in trilingual format (English, Japanese, and Chinese). It aims to enhance communication among the federation's members, to provide a record of all their dedicated work. The newsletter includes activity reports, essays, research results, personal profiles, news clippings and photos, and other documents which are relevant to Global Alliance's cause. It has over 3000 affiliated organizations, schools, libraries, U.S. government and U.N. agencies. There is no subscription fee for this newsletter, and it is supported through donations and volunteerships.

== Related events ==
- In 2000, H.Res 759, a resolution ordering Japan to apologize and compensate victims of war crimes committed during World War II, was proposed to the U.S. House of Representatives. The resolution included measures for comfort women, women forced into providing sex to the Japanese Army. Congressman Lane Evans - Illinois's 13th congressional district - submitted the resolution to the United States House Committee on Foreign Affairs, formerly known as the International Relations Committee, on June 19 for consideration during the 106th Congress in September. This resolution is the second of its kind, following one submitted by Congressman William Lipinski- Illinois's 3rd congressional district - in July 1997. The resolution was passed on to the International Relations Committee's Subcommittee on Asia and the Pacific, but it was later scrapped when congressmen delayed passing the resolutions, fearing damage to United States relations with Japan.
- In 2006, two members of the United States Congress, Representative Lane Evans (D-Illinois) and Representative Chris Smith (R-New Jersey), have introduced a non-binding resolution (H.Res. 759) in the current congressional session which calls on the government of Japan to "formally acknowledge and accept responsibility for its sexual enslavement of young women" during the 1930s and 40s.
