= Project controller =

The project controller is a key member of the project team and works directly with the project manager to help define the project's goals and objectives; create and maintain a project's budget and schedule, analyze progress reported against the work schedules; and recommend actions to improve progress. In order to ensure accurate documentation and reporting on a consistent basis, many organizations are positioning the project manager and project controller as part of a centralized project support organization.

== Job ==
Project controllers are often employed by consulting firms that perform management, technology, and/or human capital work for an external client. Although titles vary from firm to firm, most large consulting firms such as Accenture, PWC, Deloitte and Bearing Point have individuals who perform project controller duties. The project controller is responsible for overseeing the financial health of the project by analyzing costs, revenue, risks, and pricing for the consulting firm. The role of the project controller can vary depending on the type and scale of the project, but most all project controllers maintain budget tracking tools, issue invoices and billings, manage fee structures, and forecast potential gains and losses in pursuing future work with a client.

Not all projects have a project controller. Smaller projects that are expected to be shorter in duration typically may have no project controller overseeing the daily financial activity of the project. The responsibility will usually be assumed by the project manager of the project. For larger scale projects or projects requiring on-site interaction with the external client (typically public sector projects), there may be one or several project controllers to ensure that staffing levels and billing rates are appropriate for the budgetary scope of the project. Because most project controllers are serving the internal project management team, they are typically considered non-billable to the client. However, in projects where client staff and the consulting firm work in the same unit, some clients have agreed to be billed for project controllers to facilitate financial transactions and communications between the consulting firm and the client. Some project controllers will also perform expense audits for the project to ensure that all expenses to the project are in compliance with the consulting firm's and the client's expense policies.

Along with profit/loss analysis and budgeting, project controllers are often involved in the original pricing of a project. The pricing of a project occurs before the work begins and is meant to decide the best fee structure and overall cost to the client for the service that will be provided. The project controller helps determine the optimal price to charge the client in order to retain profit at the end of the engagement.

== Qualification ==
Although there are no formal qualification criteria, project controllers usually have graduate level training in project management or finance such as MSF or MBA degrees, or are qualified accountants (i.e. CIMA, CCA, ACCA, CGA, CMA, or CA designation). "Industry experience" is often a pre-requisite and so controllers often have undergraduate degrees in related fields. Also, many analysts originally enter this domain through their practice as consultants or accountants and so a very wide range of qualifications is common.

In some firms, it is (additionally) preferred that analysts earn a professional certification such as the Chartered Institute of Management Accountants (CIMA) Chartered Financial Analyst (CFA) designation, or the Certified International Investment Analyst (CIIA) designation. However, professional designation is rarely a requirement, and many have reached the peak of the profession without ever sitting for the CFA or the CIIA exam.

Basic analytical skills, and strong numerical skills are necessary and a proficient understanding of and experience with Microsoft Excel is usually required.

== See also ==
- Accounting analyst
- Financial services
- Financial Analyst
