= Executive sponsor =

Senior executive responsible for guiding and overseeing a project

Executive sponsor (sometimes called project sponsor or senior responsible owner) is a role in project management, usually the senior member of the project board and often the chair. The project sponsor will be a senior executive in a corporation (often at or just below board level) who is responsible to the business for the success of the project.

== Responsibilities ==
The sponsor has a number of interfaces and responsibilities for the project.

=== Board ===
The responsibilities for which the sponsor is accountable to the board are:

- Provides leadership on culture and values
- Owns the business case
- Keeps project aligned with organization's strategy and portfolio direction
- Governs project risk
- Works with other sponsors
- Focuses on realization of benefits
- Recommends opportunities to optimize cost/benefits
- Ensures continuity of sponsorship
- Provides assurance
- Provides feedback and lessons learned

=== Project manager ===
The governance activities that take place between the sponsor and the project manager are:

- Provides timely decisions
- Clarifies decision-making framework
- Clarifies business priorities and strategy
- Communicates business issues
- Provides resources
- Engenders trust
- Manages relationships
- Supports the project manager's role
- Promotes ethical working

=== Project stakeholders ===
In addition to these activities the following activities take place between the sponsor and other project stakeholders:

- Engages stakeholders
- Governs stakeholder communications
- Directs client relationships
- Directs governance of users
- Directs governance of suppliers
- Arbitrates between stakeholders

== Impact ==
Due to the problem-solving needs of the role, the executive sponsor often needs to be able to exert pressure within the organization to overcome resistance to the project. For this reason a successful executive sponsor will ideally be a person with five personal attributes - understanding, competence, credibility, commitment and engagement.

A few research studies have been published that not only detail the role of this individual within project management but also provide a way to ensure that the success of a project is increased if this individual plays a more active role.

== Senior Responsible Officer role ==
The UK government treats the role of a Senior Responsible Officer (SRO) as distinct from the sponsor's role, referring to projects where the sponsor "may be considered to be at a very senior level or part of a sponsoring group, above the SRO". In relation to oversight of contract delivery, the term "Senior Contract Owner" has similar a similar meaning. Professional Standards specifically for SROs were, as of July 2019, under development.

A Public Administration Select Committee report published in 2011, which was critical of UK government IT procurement, noted that SROs had often moved on to new roles during the course of an acquisition project, and this was one of the reasons why problems had been encountered.

== See also ==
- Project sponsorship
