= Cost engineering =

Practice of regarding cost in engineering projects

Cost engineering is "the engineering practice devoted to the management of project cost, involving such activities as estimating, cost control, cost forecasting, investment appraisal and risk analysis". "Cost Engineers budget, plan and monitor investment projects. They seek the optimum balance between cost, quality and time requirements."

Skills and knowledge of cost engineers are similar to those of quantity surveyors. In many industries, cost engineering is synonymous with project controls. As the title "engineer" has legal requirements in many jurisdictions (e.g. Canada, Texas), the cost engineering discipline is often renamed to project controls.

A cost engineer is "an engineer whose judgment and experience are utilized in the application of scientific principles and techniques to problems of estimation; cost control; business planning and management science; profitability analysis; project management; and planning and scheduling".

== Overview ==
One key objective of cost engineering is to arrive at accurate cost estimates and schedules, and to avoid cost overruns and schedule slips. Cost engineering goes beyond preparing cost estimates and schedules by helping manage resources and supporting assessment and decision-making. "The discipline of ‘cost engineering’ can be considered to encompass a wide range of cost-related aspects of engineering and programme management, but in particular cost estimating, cost analysis/cost assessment, design-to-cost, schedule analysis/planning and risk assessment." The broad array of cost engineering topics represent the intersection of the fields of project management, business management, and engineering. Most people have a limited view of what engineering encompasses. The most obvious perception is that engineering addresses technical issues, such as the physical design of a structure or system. However, beyond the physical manifestation of a design of a structure or system (for example, a building), there are other dimensions to consider such as the money, time, and other resources that were invested in the creation of the building. Cost engineers refer to these investments collectively as "costs".

Cost engineering, then, can be considered an adjunct of traditional engineering. It recognizes and focuses on the relationships between the physical and cost dimensions of whatever is being "engineered". Cost engineering is most often taught at universities as part of construction engineering, engineering management, civil engineering, and related curricula because it is most often practiced on engineering and construction capital projects. Engineering economics is a core skill and knowledge area of cost engineering.

Associations, considered non-profit organizations--one example, is AACE International "is dedicated to the tenets of furthering the concepts of Total Cost Management and Cost Engineering. Total Cost Management is the effective application of professional and technical expertise to plan and control resources, costs, profitability and risk. Simply stated, it is a systematic approach to managing cost throughout the life cycle of any enterprise, program, facility, project, product or service. This is accomplished through the application of cost engineering and cost management principles, proven methodologies and the latest technology in support of the management process. ... Total Cost Management is that area of engineering practice where engineering judgment and experience are utilized in the application of scientific principles and techniques to problems of business and program planning; cost estimating; economic and financial analysis; cost engineering; program and project management; planning and scheduling; and cost and schedule performance measurement and change control. In summary, the list of practice areas ... are collectively called cost engineering; while the “process” through which these practices are applied is called total cost management or TCM.

== History ==
Cost engineering is a field of engineering practice that began in the 1950s (AACE International was founded in 1956). The skills and knowledge areas of cost engineers are similar to those of quantity surveyors. AACE International is one of many international engineering organizations representing practitioners in these fields. The International Cost Engineering Congress (ICEC) was founded in 1976 as a Worldwide Confederation of Cost Engineering, Quantity Surveying and Project Management Societies.

In 2006, AACE published the Total Cost Management (TCM) Framework, which outlines an integrated process for applying the skills and knowledge of cost engineering (see References). This has also been called the world's first process for portfolio, program and project management.

== Professional titles or positions in cost engineering ==
"Cost engineering practitioners tend to be: a) specialized in function (e.g., cost estimating, planning and scheduling, etc.); b) focused on either the asset management or project control side of the TCM process; and c) focused on a particular industry (e.g., engineering and construction, manufacturing, information technology, etc) or asset type (e.g., chemical process, buildings, software, etc.)... They may work for the business that owns and operates the asset (emphasis on economics and analysis), or they may work for the contractor that executes the projects (emphasis on planning and control)."

Some titles or positions in the Cost Engineering practice include:

- Claims and Changes Specialist
- Construction Estimator
- Construction Manager
- Contract Management Specialist
- Cost Analyst
- Cost Engineer
- Cost Estimator (or Estimator)
- Planner/Scheduler (or Scheduling Engineer)
- Pre-Construction Manager
- Project Controls Engineer
- Project Controls Manager
- Project Controls
- Project Controller
- Project Manager
- Quantity Surveyor
- Estimating Engineer
- Forecast Engineer
- Budgeting and Analyser
- Cost Control Manager

== See also ==
- AACE International
- Building estimator
- Construction Management
- Cost estimate
- Construction Estimating Software
- Cost overrun
- Cost-plus contract
- International Cost Engineering Council
- Moral hazard
- Muntzing
- Optimism bias
- Pre-construction services
- Project management
- Quantity surveyor
- Reference class forecasting
- Risk management
  - Risk premium
- Total delivery cost
- Value engineering
