= AACE International =

Engineering organization in the US

AACE International (Association for the Advancement of Cost Engineering) was founded in 1956 by 59 cost estimators and cost engineers during the organizational meeting of the American Association of Cost Engineering at the University of New Hampshire in Durham, New Hampshire. AACE International Headquarters is located in Morgantown, West Virginia, USA. AACE is a 501(c)(3) non-profit professional association. AACE International is a member of the Board of the Council of Engineering and Scientific Specialty Boards (CESB).

== Activities ==
AACE is a non-profit organization with about 15 employees at its headquarters in Morgantown, WV. A variety of other organizations in the United States provide similar certifications, often specialized for particular industries, such as power, manufacturing, gas and oil.

AACE is the publisher of Cost Engineering, a bi-monthly technical journal, Skills and Knowledge of Cost Engineering (currently in its 6th edition), Source magazine (a bi-monthly magazine), 20 different AACE International Professional Practice Guides, approximately 120 Recommended Practices, and its most comprehensive publication, the Total Cost Management Framework: An Integrated Approach to Portfolio, Program and Project Management.

== Certification programs ==
AACE currently manages eight certification programs, as listed below. All require agreeing to adhere to canons of ethics, and passing an examination. Most require prior industry experience, and also involve recertification by continuing education or reexamination.

- Certified Cost Technician (formerly known as Interim Cost Consultant), an entry-level certification and is not eligible for renewal
- Certified Scheduling Technician, an entry-level certification
- Certified Cost Professional (formerly Certified Cost Consultant / Certified Cost Engineer), which additionally requires a technical paper submission
- Certified Estimating Professional
- Certified Forensic Claims Consultant, which has additional requirements, including submission of a publication
- Decision & Risk Management Professional
- Earned Value Professional
- Planning & Scheduling Professional

Since becoming a charter member of the Council of Engineering and Scientific Specialty Boards in 1990, six of its certification programs (CCP, CCT, CEP, CST, EVP and PSP) have been accredited by the CESB.

== Membership ==
As of 2012, AACE reported over 8,000 members. To network in local areas, there are over 80 local sections located in 80 countries. There are also 11 technical subcommittees and 17 special interest groups.
