= Resource (project management) =

In project management, resources are required to carry out the project tasks

In project management, resources are required to carry out the project tasks. These can be people, equipment, facilities, funding, or anything else capable of definition (usually other than labour) required for the completion of a project activity. The lack of a resource can therefore be a constraint on the completion of the project activity. Resources may be storable or not storable. Storable resources remain available unless depleted by usage, and may be replenished by project tasks that produce them. Nonstorable resources must be renewed for each time period, even if not used in previous periods.

Resource scheduling, availability, and optimisation are considered key to successful project management.

Allocation of limited resources is based on the priority given to each of the project activities. Their priorities are calculated using the critical path method and heuristic analysis. For a case with a constraint on the available resources, the objective is to create the most efficient schedule possible - minimising project duration and maximising the use of the resources available.

== See also ==
- Project management
- List of project management software
