= PRINCE2 =

Project management method

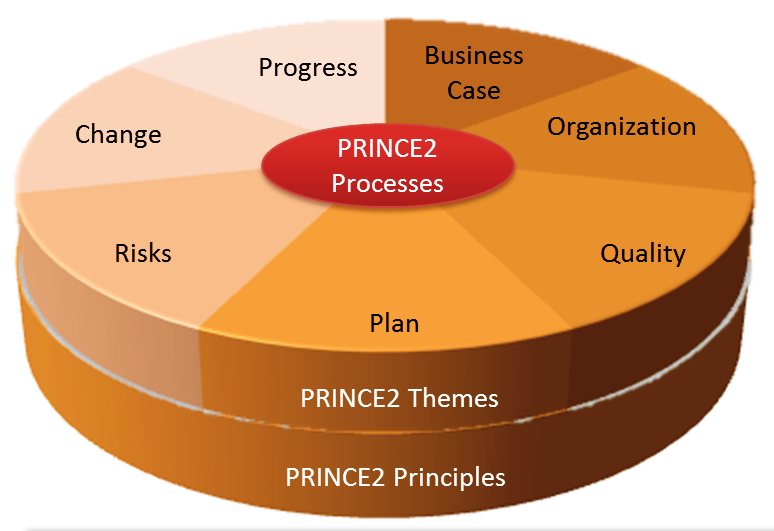
PRINCE2 – structure

PRINCE2 (PRojects IN Controlled Environments) is a structured project management method and practitioner certification programme. PRINCE2 emphasises dividing projects into manageable and controllable stages.

It is adopted in many countries worldwide, including the UK, Western European countries, and Australia. PRINCE2 training is available in many languages.

PRINCE2 was developed as a UK government standard for information systems projects. In July 2013, ownership of the rights to PRINCE2 were transferred from HM Cabinet Office to AXELOS Ltd, a joint venture by the Cabinet Office and Capita, with 49% and 51% stakes respectively.

In 2021, PRINCE2 was transferred to PeopleCert during their acquisition of AXELOS.

== History ==
PRINCE was derived from an earlier method called PROMPT II (Project Resource Organisation Management Planning Techniques). In 1989 the Central Computer and Telecommunications Agency (CCTA) adopted a version of PROMPT II as a UK Government standard for information systems (IT) project management. They gave it the name 'PRINCE', which originally stood for "PROMPT II IN the CCTA Environment". PRINCE was renamed in a civil service competition as an acronym for "PRojects IN Controlled Environments". PRINCE2 is the second edition of the earlier PRINCE method which was initially announced and developed in 1989 by the Central Computer and Telecommunications Agency (CCTA), a UK government support agency. PRINCE2 was released in 1996 as a generic project management method.

Since then, PRINCE2 became increasingly popular and is now a de facto standard for project management in many UK government departments and across the United Nations system.

There have been three major revisions of PRINCE2 since its launch in 1996: "PRINCE2:2009 Refresh" in 2009, and "PRINCE2 2017 Update" in 2017. The justification for the 2017 update was the evolution in practical business practices and feedback from PRINCE2 practitioners in the actual project environment. More recently, in 2023 AXELOS launched PRINCE2 7 - the 7th edition - which is described below.

== Overview of PRINCE2 ==
=== Seven aspects of project performance ===
These aspects are also called tolerances or performance goals. Tolerances define the delegated levels of authority which are set by a higher level of management to a lower level. The management level responsible must manage within the tolerances provided only as long as they are not forecast to be exceeded. Otherwise they are deemed to be an exception which requires escalating to the management level which delegated them. This way of managing is known as 'management by exception' and is one of the principles of PRINCE2. By managing in this way, it saves the time of senior management. In some organisations tolerances can be key performance indicators (KPIs). In the following table project level tolerances are summarised:

Tolerance type	Defined in management product	Example
Scope	Project/stage plan, work package description	The printer must print documents in black/white, and should also print in colour.
Timescale	Project/stage plan, work package description	The work must be delivered within 2–3 months.
Risk	Business case, stage plan, work package description	Printer might not work if it is exposed to water.
Quality	Project product description, product description	Printer should not suffer mechanical failure when printing between 2,000 and 10,000 pages.
Benefits	Business case, stage plan	Sales should enable a net profit of between £200,000 to £400,000.
Cost	Project/stage plan, work package description	The cost of the project should be between £100,000 and £150,000.
Sustainability	Business case, stage plan, work package description, product description	Toner for the printer must be carbon neutral.

Management level	Delegated tolerance level	Escalated issue/exception
Business layer	Project tolerance	—N/a
Project board	Stage tolerance	Project exception
Project manager	Work package tolerance	Stage exception
Team manager	—N/a	Issue

=== Seven principles (why, or guidelines to follow) ===
PRINCE2 is based on seven principles and these cannot be tailored. The PRINCE2 principles can be described as a mindset that keeps the project aligned with the PRINCE2 methodology. If a project does not adhere to these principles, it is not being managed using PRINCE2.

1. Ensure continued business justification: The business case is the most important document, and is updated at every stage of the project to ensure that the project is still viable. Early termination can occur if this ceases to be the case.
2. Learn from experience: Each project maintains a lessons log and projects should continually refer to their own and to previous and concurrent projects' lesson logs to avoid reinventing wheels. Unless lessons provoke change, they are only lessons identified (not learned).
3. Define roles, responsibilities, and relationships: Roles are separated from individuals, who may take on multiple roles or share a role. Roles in PRINCE2 are structured in four levels (corporate or programme management, project board, project manager level and team level). Project Management Team contains the last three, where all primary stakeholders (business, user, supplier) need to be presented.
4. Manage by stages: The project is planned and controlled on a stage by stage basis. Moving between stages includes updating the business case, risks, overall plan, and detailed next-stage plan in the light of new evidence.
5. Manage by exception: A PRINCE2 project has defined tolerances (6 aspects above) for each project objective, to establish limits of delegated authority. If a management level forecasts that these tolerances are exceeded (e.g. time of a management stage will be longer than the estimated time in the current management stage), it is escalated to the next management level for a decision how to proceed.
6. Focus on products: A PRINCE2 project focuses on the definition and delivery of the products, in particular their quality requirements.
7. Tailor to suit the project: PRINCE2 is tailored to suit the project environment, size, complexity, importance, time capability and risk. Tailoring is the first activity in the process initiating a project and reviewed for each stage.

Not every aspect of PRINCE2 will be applicable to every project, thus every process has a note on scalability. This provides guidance to the project manager (and others involved in the project) as to how much of the process to apply. The positive aspect of this is that PRINCE2 can be tailored to the needs of a particular project. The negative aspect is that many of the essential elements of PRINCE2 can be omitted sometimes resulting in a PINO project – PRINCE in Name Only

=== Seven PRINCE2 practices and the management products used to support each practice ===
Practice	Management products which support the practice
Business case	Business case; Benefits management approach; Sustainability management approach
Organizing	Communication management approach; Project management team structure; Role descriptions
Quality	Product description; Quality management approach; Quality register; Product register
Plans	Plan (project, stage, team, exception); Project product description; Work package description
Risk	Risk management approach; Risk register
Issues	Issue management approach; Issue register; Issue report
Progress	Digital and data management approach; Daily log; Lessons log; Checkpoint report; Highlight report; Lessons report; Exception report; End stage report; End project report

=== Seven processes (who does what and when from start to finish) ===
1. Starting up a project, in which the project team is appointed including an executive and a project manager, and a project brief is produced.
2. Initiating a project, in which the business case is refined and project initiation documentation is assembled.
3. Directing a project, in which the project board directs the project manager and oversees the project.
4. Controlling a stage, in which the project manager authorises work packages to team managers, manages issues and risks, and reports progress to the project board.
5. Managing product delivery, which provides an interface between the project manager and the team manager(s) by placing formal requirements on accepting, executing and delivering project work.
6. Managing stage boundaries, in which the project manager prepares the information for the project board to decide whether to authorise the next stage or close the project.
7. Closing a project, in which the project is the formally closed, follow-on actions are documented and assigned, lessons are learned, and benefits are evaluated.

=== People in PRINCE2 ===
The 7th edition of PRINCE2 introduced a major new aspect to the method - the role of people. The purpose of a project is to deliver change, which will affect the people who perform business as usual (BAU) activities. How well the project delivers the change, depends on the capabilities of the project team, the strength of the relationships between them, and the people impacted by the change. For these reasons, PRINCE2 recommends that projects must incorporate change management to be able to successfully implement the change into the organization.

== Integration with other techniques ==
The management products described by PRINCE2 are only used for the "high-level" management of the project. Within its tasks, task managers must still decide on their own project management framework. Some suggestions given in the PRINCE2 manual are product based planning, change control, quality review technique, Kanban boards, Gantt charts, PERT charts and critical path analysis.

PRINCE2 can also be used to manage projects that use agile software development methods.

=== Quality review technique ===
The quality review technique ensures a project's products are of the required standard (i.e. meet defined quality criteria). This takes place in a quality review meeting, which identifies errors in the product. The quality review meeting will not attempt to solve the problems it identifies. The meeting brings together people who have an interest in the project's outputs (or products) and people on the project team able to address issues identified.

== History of PRINCE2 editions ==
Below is a list of all the editions of PRINCE2. As of 1 January 2020, "PRINCE2 2017" was renamed "PRINCE2 6th Edition". Also, the previous edition, "PRINCE2 2009" was renamed "PRINCE2 5th Edition". There were no other changes except the name of the brand. The reason for the name change was to "ensure the format of the name is aligned with that used by other frameworks within the project management industry". As list of all versions of PRINCE2 are printed in the cover of the PRINCE2 manual:

Release year	Release name	Release edition
1996	PRINCE2 1996	PRINCE2 1st Edition*
1998	PRINCE2 1998	PRINCE2 2nd Edition*
2002	PRINCE2 2002	PRINCE2 3rd Edition*
2005	PRINCE2 2005	PRINCE2 4th Edition*
2009	PRINCE2 2009	PRINCE2 5th Edition
2017	PRINCE2 2017	PRINCE2 6th Edition
2023	PRINCE2 2023	PRINCE2 7th Edition

(*nth names added for other editions in order for context, but they were not referred to these names originally. However, they are referenced as such in the PRINCE2 manual cover page.)

== Differences between 2009 and 2017 versions of PRINCE2 Manual ==
2009 version	2017 version	Type
Benefits review plan	Benefits management approach	Management product
Communication management strategy	Communication management approach	Management product
Risk management strategy	Risk management approach	Management product
Quality management strategy	Quality management approach	Management product
Configuration management strategy	Change control approach	Management product

== New aspects introduced in the 7th edition ==
PRINCE2 7th edition
Performance target for sustainability
Renaming of some principles
Renaming of themes to practices
Change practice now called Issues
Configuration management strategy
Introduction of new management products: sustainability management approach, digital and data management approach, project log.

== Advantages and criticisms ==
Some of the advertised benefits of PRINCE2 are: increased quality of the finished products, efficient control of resources, avoidance of either "heroic" (under-regulated) or "mechanistic" (over-regulated) working, and increased confidence among the project team.

PRINCE2 is sometimes considered inappropriate for small projects or where requirements are expected to change, due to the work required in creating and maintaining documents, logs and lists. The deliverable structure may also lead to focus on producing deliverables for their own sake, to "tick the boxes" rather than do more useful work.

The general response of PRINCE2's authors to criticism has been to point out that the methodology is scalable and can be tailored to suit the specific requirements and constraints of the project and the environment. This strong emphasis on tailoring has led some users to complain that PRINCE2 is unfalsifiable, i.e. it is impossible to tell whether PRINCE2 "works" or constitutes "best practice" if any problems encountered with a project can be blamed on inappropriate application of PRINCE2 rather than on PRINCE2 itself.

The experiences of the Blair government in the UK between 1997 and 2007 (and of subsequent UK governments) arguably undermine PRINCE2's claim to be "best practice", given the string of high-profile failed IT projects charged to the taxpayer during that time, and the controversy surrounding the financial relationship between the Blair government and PRINCE2's co-owners Capita. PRINCE2's training material addresses these failures, blaming them on inappropriate tailoring of PRINCE2 to the project environment, and advocating for more PRINCE2 training for government project managers to solve the problem.

== Differences from PMP ==
Project Management Professional (PMP) from Project Management Institute may be seen as a competitor of PRINCE2. In general, the UK and Australia prefer PRINCE2, and US prefers PMP. Asia, Africa and the Middle East area have no strong preference for PMP or PRINCE2. The important thing is that PMP (PMBOK) can be used with PRINCE2.

PRINCE2 and PMP acknowledge each other's existence in their advertising material and attempt to position themselves as complementary products – PRINCE2 as a "methodology" and PMP as a "standard" – which can be used alongside each other. In practice, companies and practitioners choose one system or both depending on the project environment, their geographical location and costs involved.

== See also ==
- Agile software development
- Comparison of project-management software
- Gantt chart
- List of project management topics
- Work breakdown structure
