= Stakeholder register =

A stakeholder register is a document that describes who (individual or group) is affected by a project, and their effect and impact on the project. A stakeholder register is ideally completed early in the project to ensure proper engagement of stakeholders. Sources for the register include:

- Project sponsor
- Senior leadership
- Project business case
- Project charter
- Analysis or research
- Subject matter experts

== Contents ==
Contents include:

- Name
- Functioning Department
- Job title
- Project role
- Significance
- Category

== See also ==
- Project stakeholder
- Stakeholder analysis
- Stakeholder engagement software
- Stakeholder management
