= Conservation and restoration of cultural property =

Process of protecting cultural property

Removal of adherent surface deposits by physical chemical means (by cotton swab) at Church of Sucevița Monastery, burial chamber, in Suceava, Romania

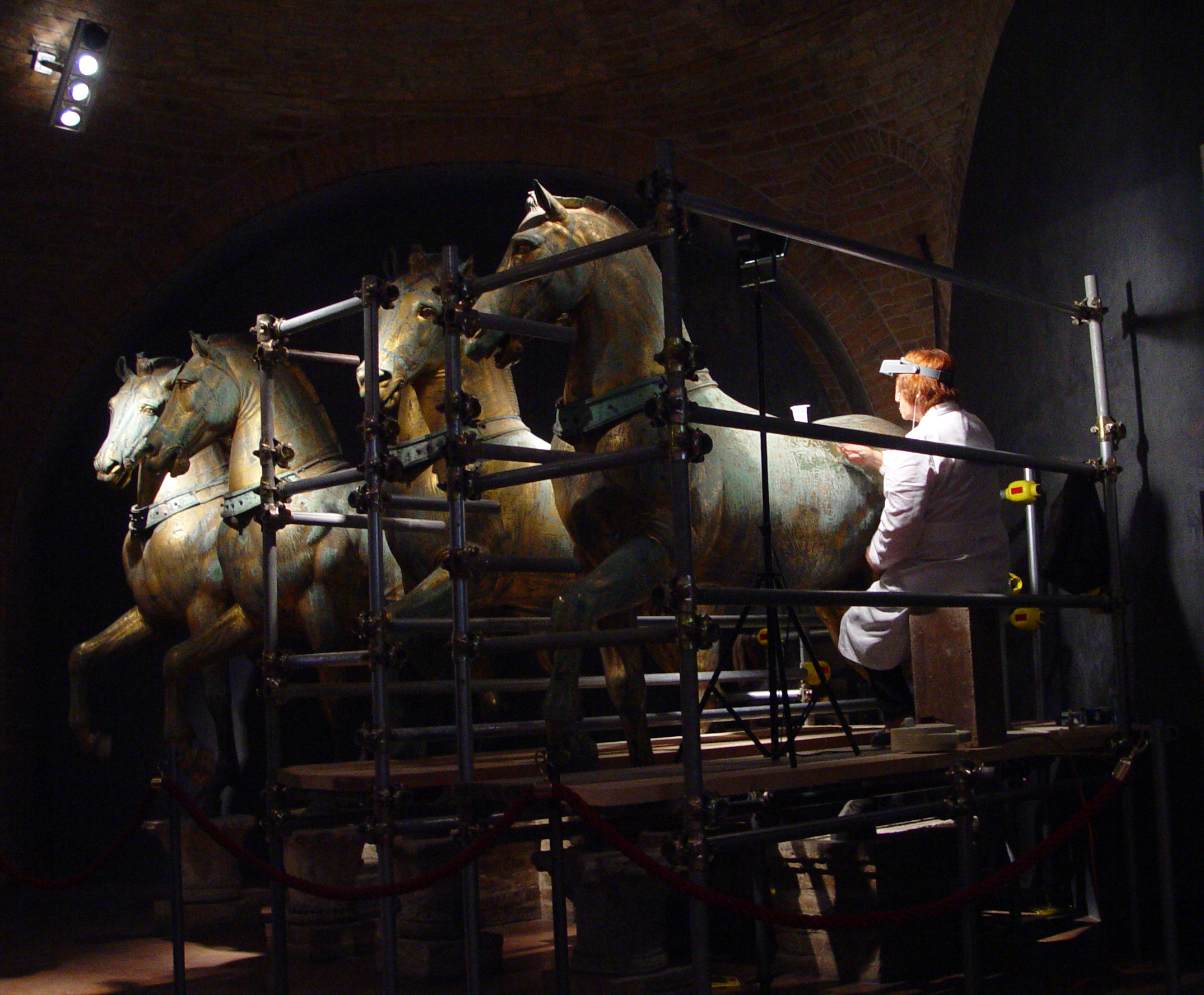
Conservation of the Horses of Saint Mark (Venice)

The conservation and restoration of cultural property focuses on protection and care of cultural property (tangible cultural heritage), including artworks, architecture, archaeology, and museum collections. Conservation activities include preventive conservation, examination, documentation, research, treatment, and education. This field is closely allied with conservation science, curators and registrars.

== Definition ==
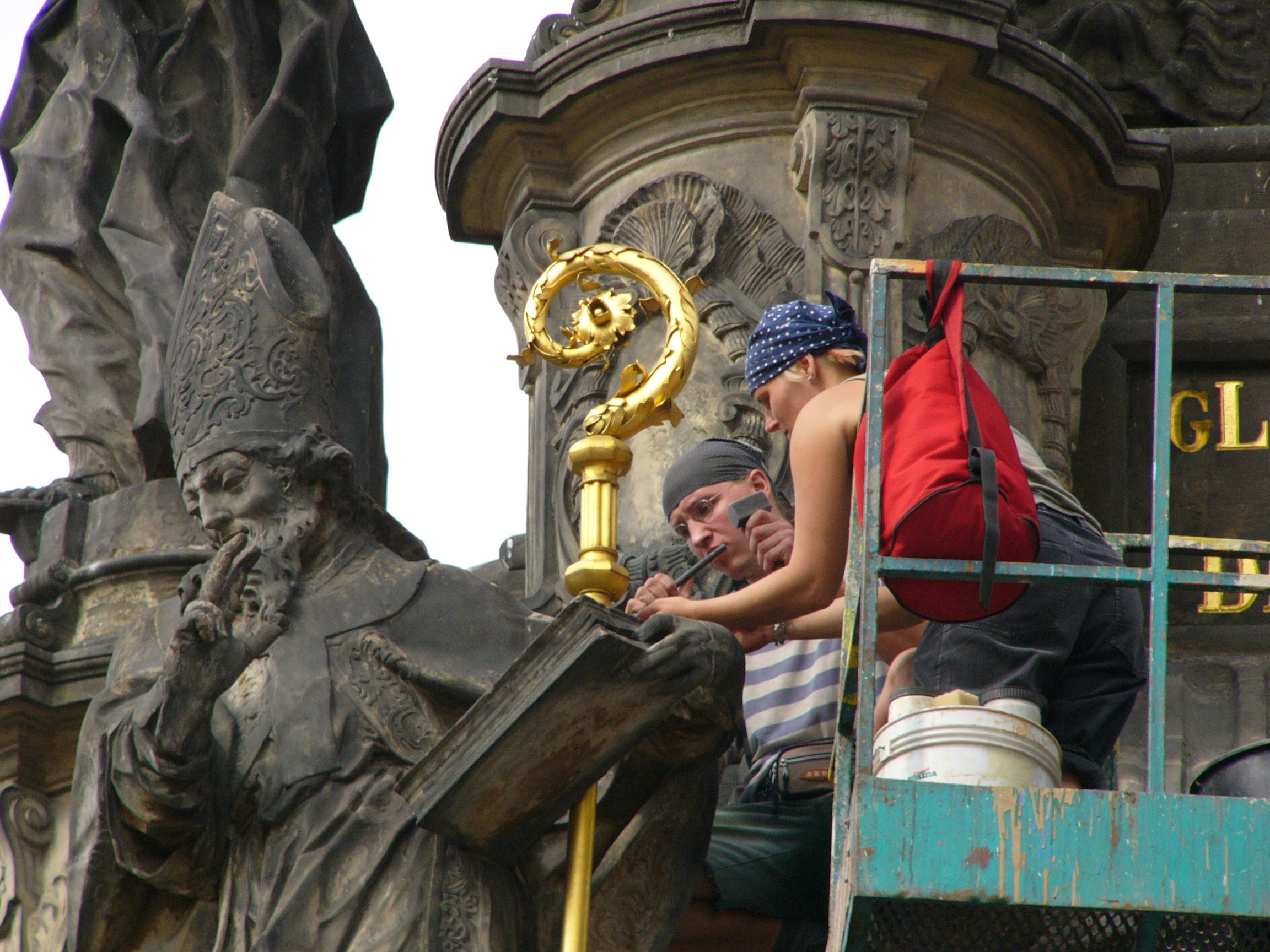
Revision and conservation of the Holy Trinity Column in Olomouc (Czech Republic) in 2006

Conservation of cultural property involves protection and restoration using "any methods that prove effective in keeping that property in as close to its original condition as possible for as long as possible." Conservation of cultural heritage is often associated with art collections and museums and involves collection care and management through tracking, examination, documentation, exhibition, storage, preventive conservation, and restoration.

The scope has widened from art conservation, involving protection and care of artwork and architecture, to conservation of cultural heritage, also including protection and care of a broad set of other cultural and historical works. Conservation of cultural heritage can be described as a type of ethical stewardship.

It may broadly be divided into:

- Conservation and restoration of movable cultural property
- Conservation and restoration of immovable cultural property

Conservation of cultural property applies simple ethical guidelines:

- Minimal intervention;
- Appropriate materials and reversible methods;
- Full documentation of all work undertaken.

Often there are compromises between preserving appearance, maintaining original design and material properties, and the ability to reverse changes. Reversibility is now emphasized so as to reduce problems with future treatment, investigation, and use.

In order for conservators to decide upon an appropriate conservation strategy and apply their professional expertise accordingly, they must take into account views of the stakeholder, the values, the artist's intent, meaning of the work, and the physical needs of the material.

Cesare Brandi in his Theory of Restoration, describes restoration as "the methodological moment in which the work of art is appreciated in its material form and in its historical and aesthetic duality, with a view to transmitting it to the future".

== History and science ==
=== Key dates ===
Some consider the tradition of conservation of cultural heritage in Europe to have begun in 1565 with the restoration of the Sistine Chapel frescoes, but more ancient examples include the work of Cassiodorus.

=== Brief history ===
An early video showing some activities in a conservation laboratory at the Rijksmuseum

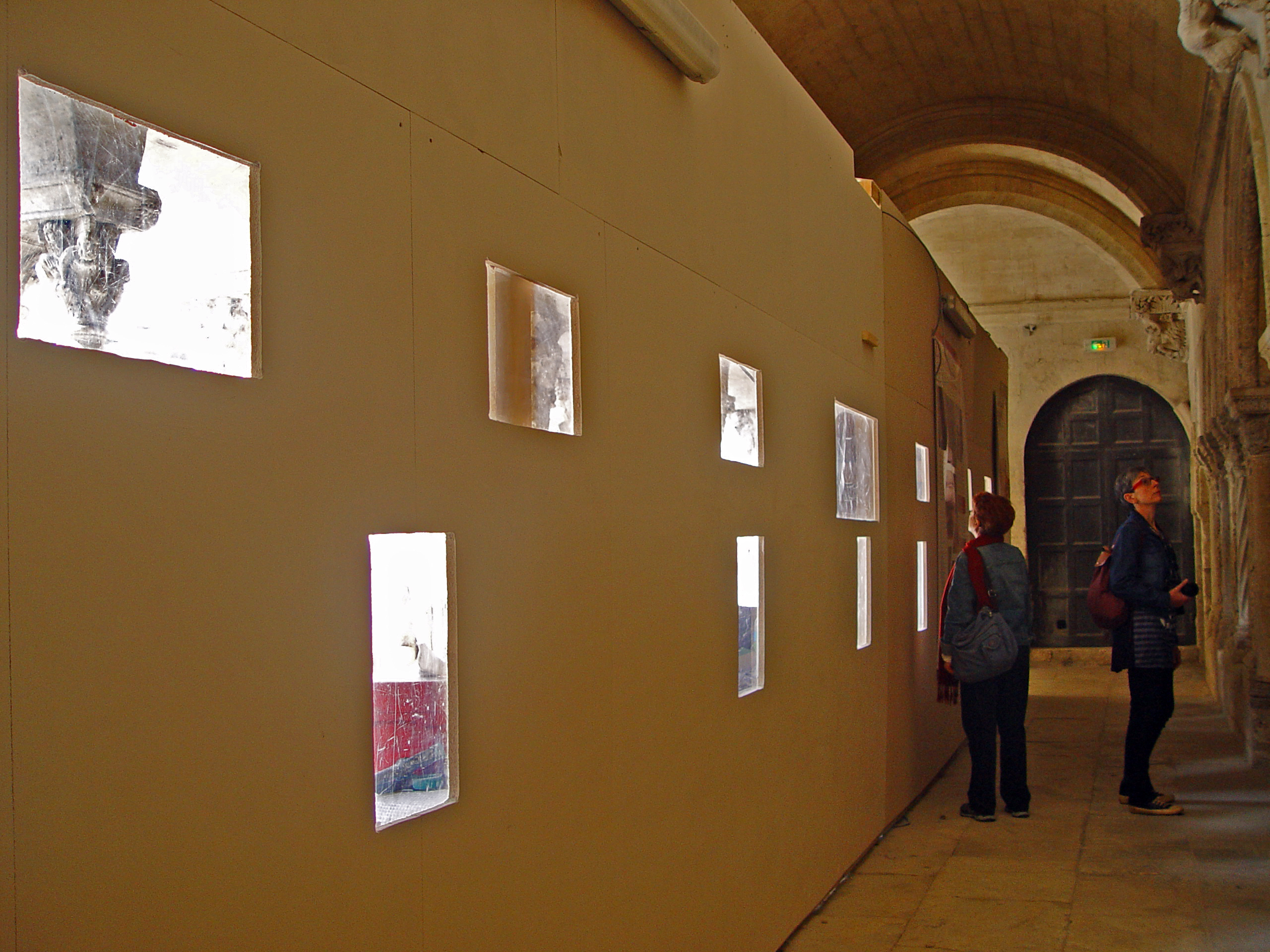
A temporary windowed partition along restoration work area in the cloister of the Church of St. Trophime, Arles

The care of cultural heritage has a long history, one that was primarily aimed at fixing and mending objects for their continued use and aesthetic enjoyment. Until the early 20th century, artists were normally the ones called upon to repair damaged artworks. During the 19th century, however, the fields of science and art became increasingly intertwined as scientists such as Michael Faraday began to study the damaging effects of the environment on works of art. Louis Pasteur carried out scientific analysis on paint as well. However, perhaps the first organized attempt to apply a theoretical framework to the conservation of cultural heritage came with the founding in the United Kingdom of the Society for the Protection of Ancient Buildings in 1877. The society was founded by William Morris and Philip Webb, both of whom were deeply influenced by the writings of John Ruskin. During the same period, a French movement with similar aims was being developed under the direction of Eugène Viollet-le-Duc, an architect and theorist, famous for his restorations of medieval buildings.

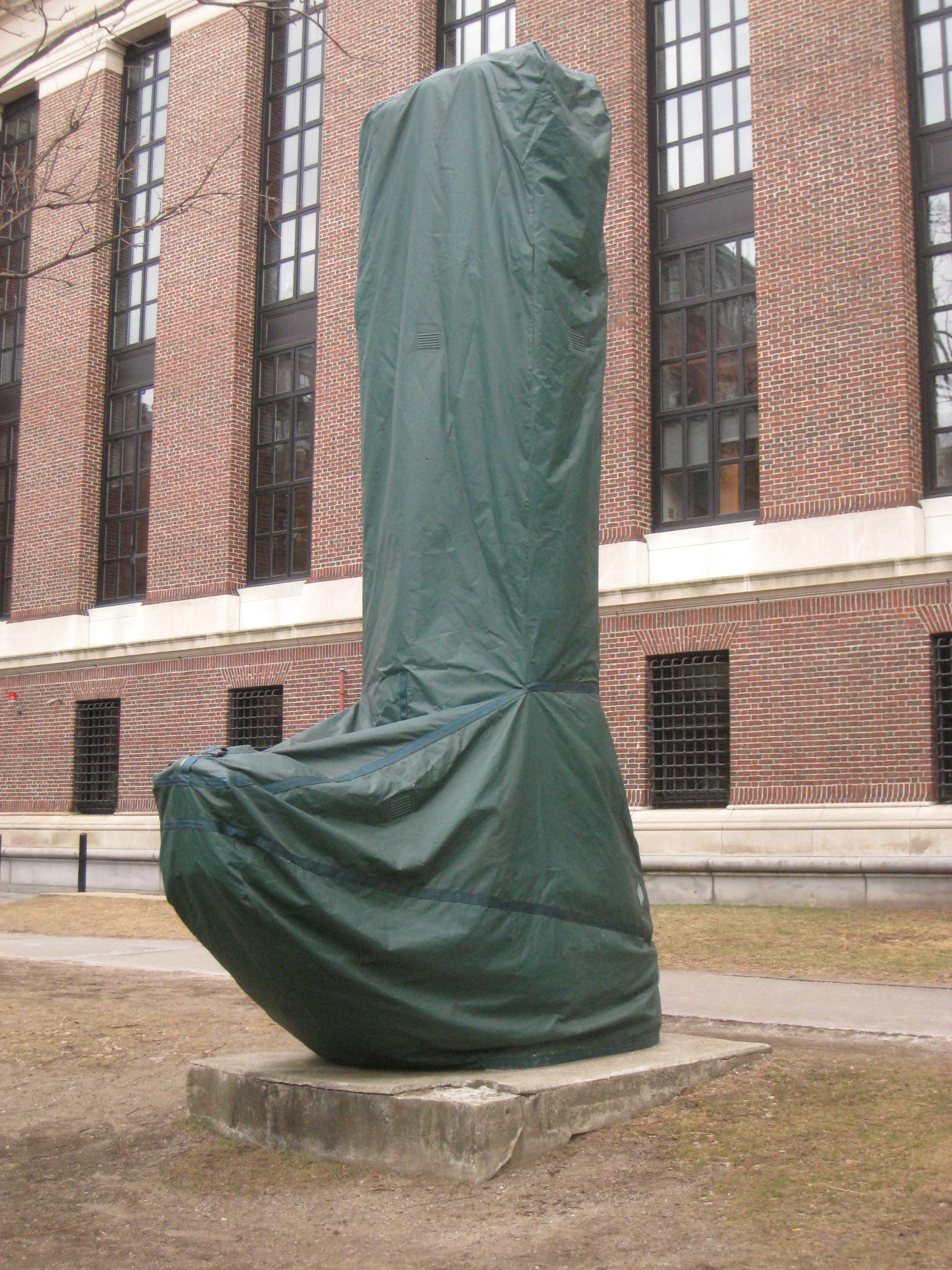
Since 1998, Harvard University wraps some of the valuable statues on its campus, such as this "Chinese stele", with waterproof covers every winter, in order to protect them from erosion caused by acid rain.

Conservation of cultural heritage as a distinct field of study initially developed in Germany, where in 1888 Friedrich Rathgen became the first chemist to be employed by a Museum, the Koniglichen Museen, Berlin (Royal Museums of Berlin). He not only developed a scientific approach to the care of objects in the collections, but disseminated this approach by publishing a Handbook of Conservation in 1898. The early development of conservation of cultural heritage in any area of the world is usually linked to the creation of positions for chemists within museums. In British archaeology, key research and technical experimentation in conservation was undertaken by women such as Ione Gedye both in the field and in archaeological collections, particularly those of the Institute of Archaeology, London.

In the United Kingdom, pioneering research into painting materials and conservation, ceramics, and stone conservation was conducted by Arthur Pillans Laurie, academic chemist and Principal of Heriot-Watt University from 1900. Laurie's interests were fostered by William Holman Hunt. In 1924 the chemist Harold Plenderleith began to work at the British Museum with Alexander Scott in the recently created Research Laboratory, although he was actually employed by the Department of Scientific and Industrial Research in the early years. Plenderleith's appointment may be said to have given birth to the conservation profession in the UK, although there had been craftsmen in many museums and in the commercial art world for generations. This department was created by the museum to address the deteriorating condition of objects in the collection, damage which were a result of their being stored in the London Underground tunnels during the First World War. The creation of this department moved the focus for the development of conservation theory and practice from Germany to Britain, and made the latter a prime force in this fledgling field. In 1956 Plenderleith wrote a significant handbook called The Conservation of Antiquities and Works of Art, which supplanted Rathgen's earlier tome and set new standards for the development of art and conservation science.

In the United States, the development of conservation of cultural heritage can be traced to the Fogg Art Museum, and Edward Waldo Forbes, its director from 1909 to 1944. He encouraged technical investigation, and was Chairman of the Advisory Committee for the first technical journal, Technical Studies in the Field of the Fine Arts, published by the Fogg from 1932 to 1942. Importantly he also brought onto the museum staff chemists. Rutherford John Gettens was the first of such in the US to be permanently employed by an art museum. He worked with George L. Stout, the founder and first editor of Technical Studies. Gettens and Stout co-authored Painting Materials: A Short Encyclopaedia in 1942, reprinted in 1966. This compendium is still cited regularly. Only a few dates and descriptions in Gettens' and Stout's book are now outdated.

George T. Oliver, of Oliver Brothers Art Restoration and Art Conservation-Boston (Est. 1850 in New York City) invented the vacuum hot table for relining paintings in 1920s; he filed a patent for the table in 1937. Taylor's prototype table, which he designed and constructed, is still in operation. Oliver Brothers is believed to be the first and the oldest continuously operating art restoration company in the United States.

The focus of conservation development then accelerated in Britain and America, and it was in Britain that the first International Conservation Organisations developed. The International Institute for Conservation of Historic and Artistic Works (IIC) was incorporated under British law in 1950 as "a permanent organization to co-ordinate and improve the knowledge, methods, and working standards needed to protect and preserve precious materials of all kinds." The rapid growth of conservation professional organizations, publications, journals, newsletters, both internationally and in localities, has spearheaded the development of the conservation profession, both practically and theoretically. Art historians and theorists such as Cesare Brandi have also played a significant role in developing conservation science theory. In recent years ethical concerns have been at the forefront of developments in conservation. Most significantly has been the idea of preventive conservation. This concept is based in part on the pioneering work by Garry Thomson CBE, and his book Museum Environment, first published in 1978. Thomson was associated with the National Gallery in London; it was here that he established a set of guidelines or environmental controls for the best conditions in which objects could be stored and displayed within the museum environment. Although his exact guidelines are no longer rigidly followed, they did inspire this field of conservation.

=== Conservation laboratories ===
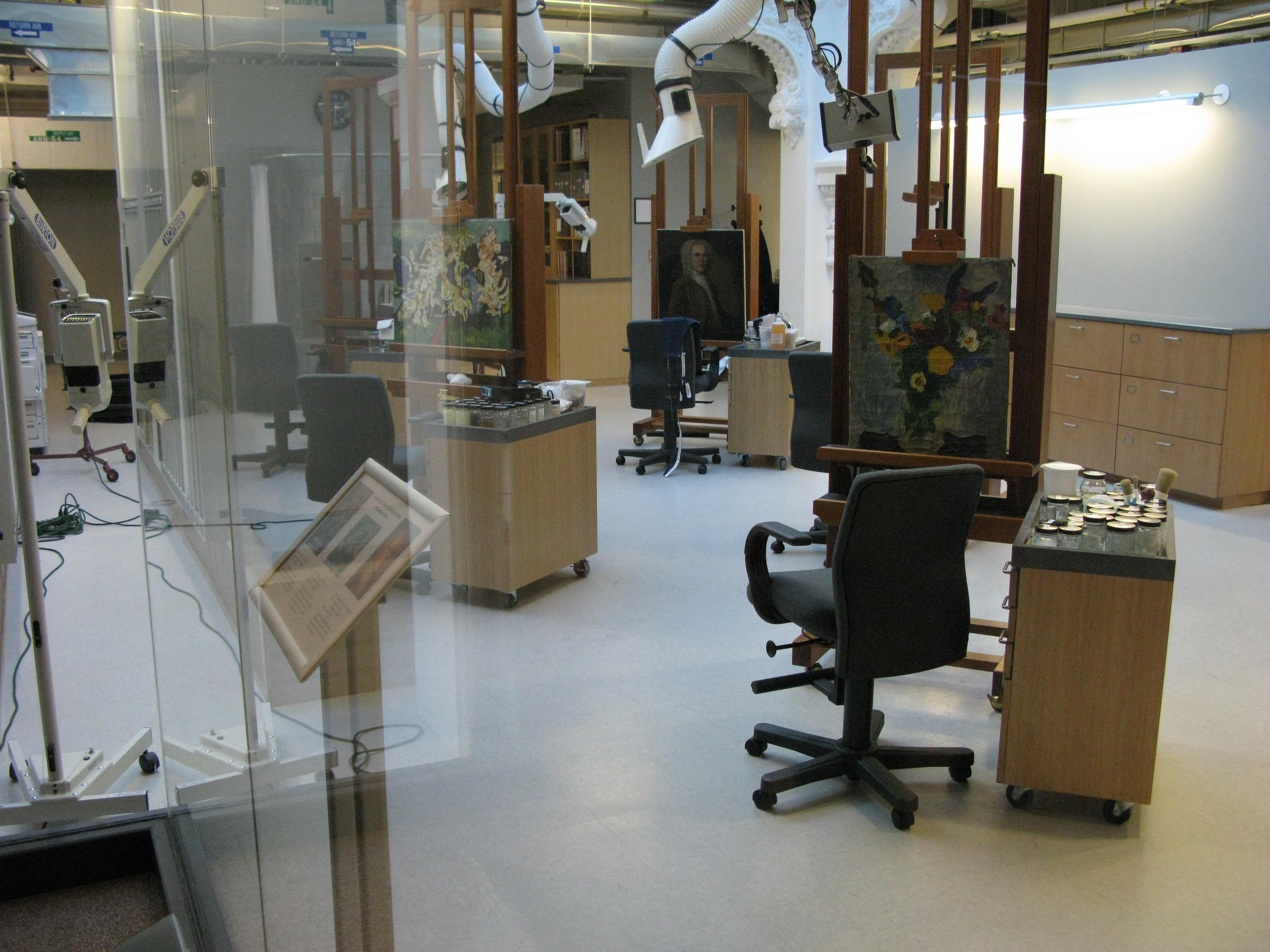
The Lunder Conservation Center. Conservation staff for both the Smithsonian American Art Museum and the National Portrait Gallery are visible to the public through floor-to-ceiling glass walls that allow visitors to see firsthand all the techniques that conservators use to examine, treat and preserve artworks within a functioning conservation Laboratory.

Conservators routinely use chemical and scientific analysis for the examination and treatment of cultural works. The modern conservation laboratory uses equipment such as microscopes, spectrometers, and various x-ray regime instruments to better understand objects and their components. The data thus collected helps in deciding the conservation treatments to be provided to the object.

== Ethics ==
The conservator's work is guided by ethical standards. These take the form of applied ethics. Ethical standards have been established across the world, and national and international ethical guidelines have been written. One such example is:

- American Institute for Conservation Code of Ethics and Guidelines for Practice

Conservation OnLine provides resources on ethical issues in conservation, including examples of codes of ethics and guidelines for professional conduct in conservation and allied fields; and charters and treaties pertaining to ethical issues involving the preservation of cultural property.

As well as standards of practice conservators deal with wider ethical concerns, such as the debates as to whether all art is worth preserving.

Keeping up with the international contemporary scenario, recent concerns with sustainability in conservation have emerged. The common understanding that "the care of an artifact should not come at the undue expense of the environment" is generally well accepted within the community and is already contemplated in guidelines of diverse institutions related to the field.

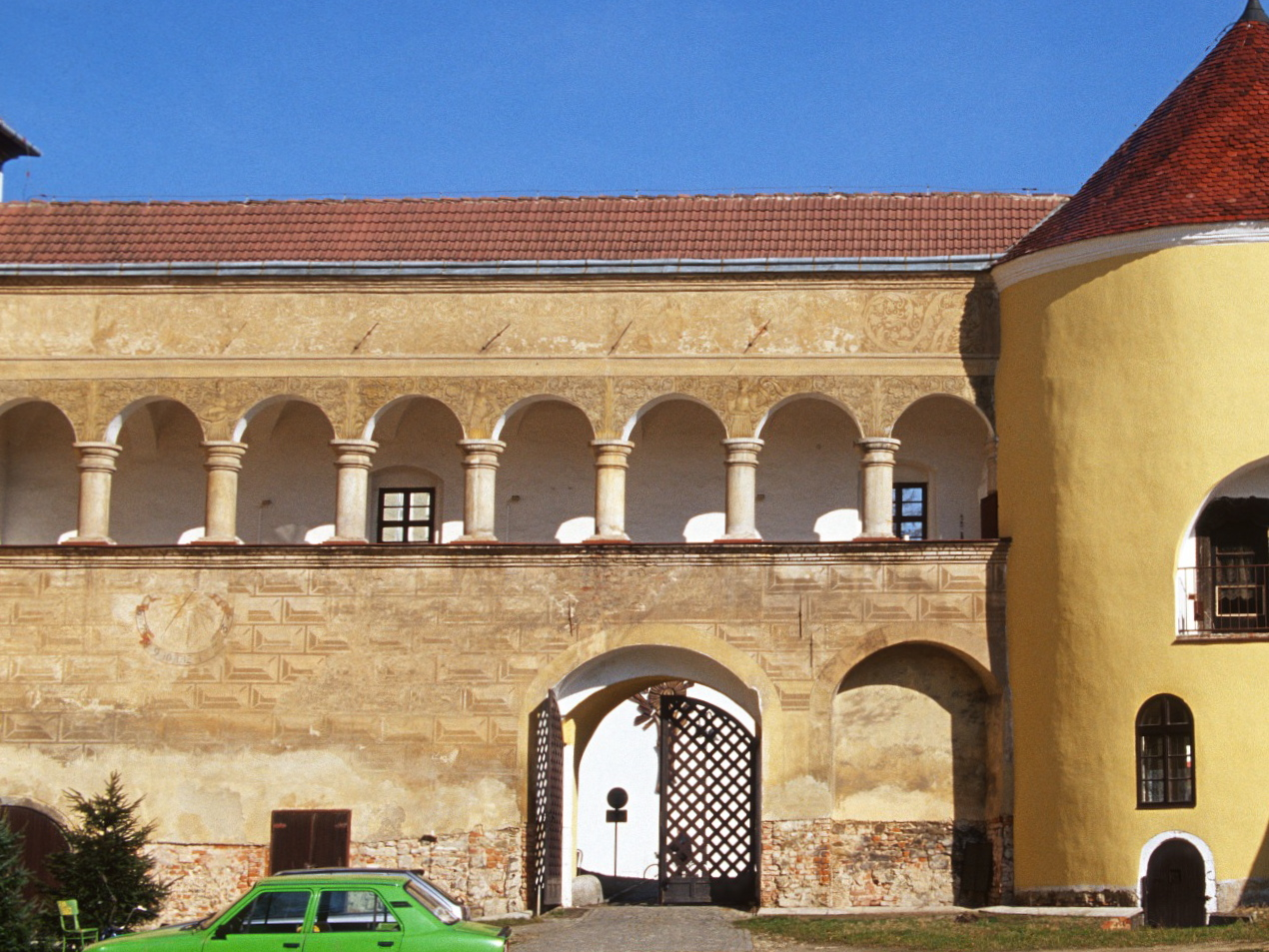
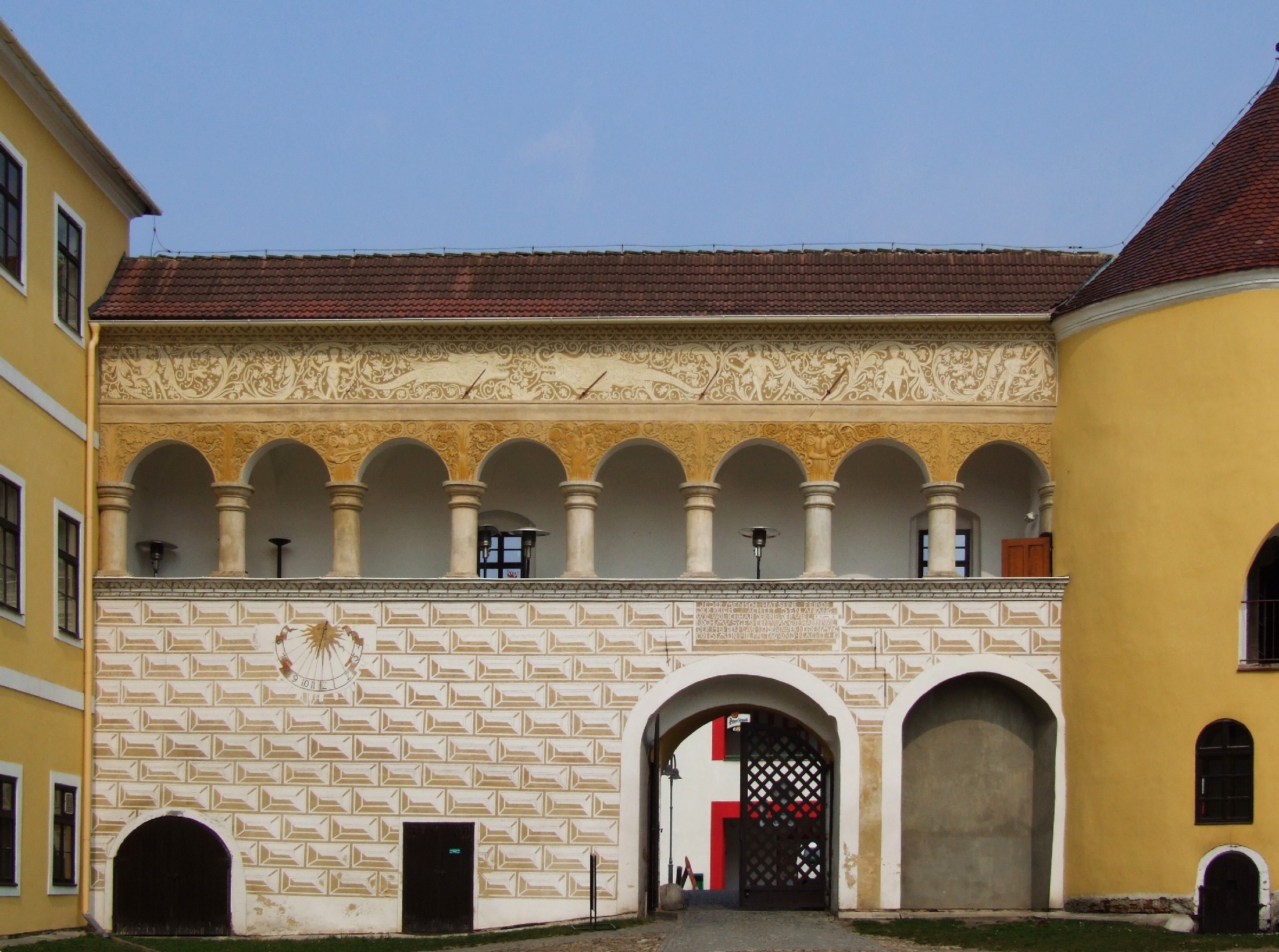
Castle gate of Krnov before (2001) and after (2009) restoration

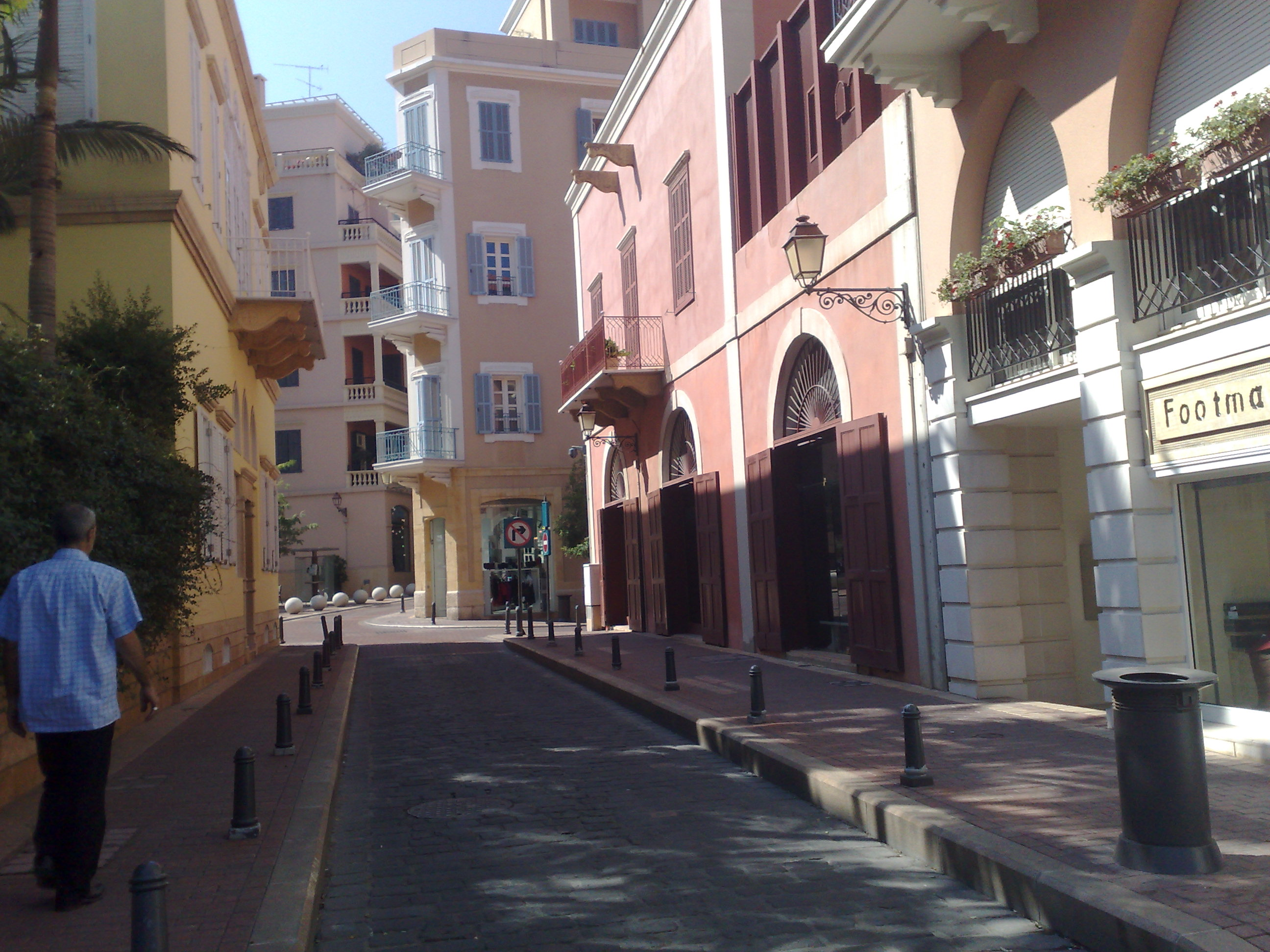
Preserved historical quarter in Beirut Central District

== Practice ==
=== Preventive conservation ===
Many cultural works are sensitive to environmental conditions such as temperature, humidity and exposure to visible light and ultraviolet radiation. These works must be protected in controlled environments where such variables are maintained within a range of damage-limiting levels. For example, watercolour paintings usually require shielding from sunlight to prevent fading of pigments.

Collections care is an important element of museum policy. It is an essential responsibility of members of the museum profession to create and maintain a protective environment for the collections in their care, whether in store, on display, or in transit. A museum should carefully monitor the condition of collections to determine when an artifact requires conservation work and the services of a qualified conservator.

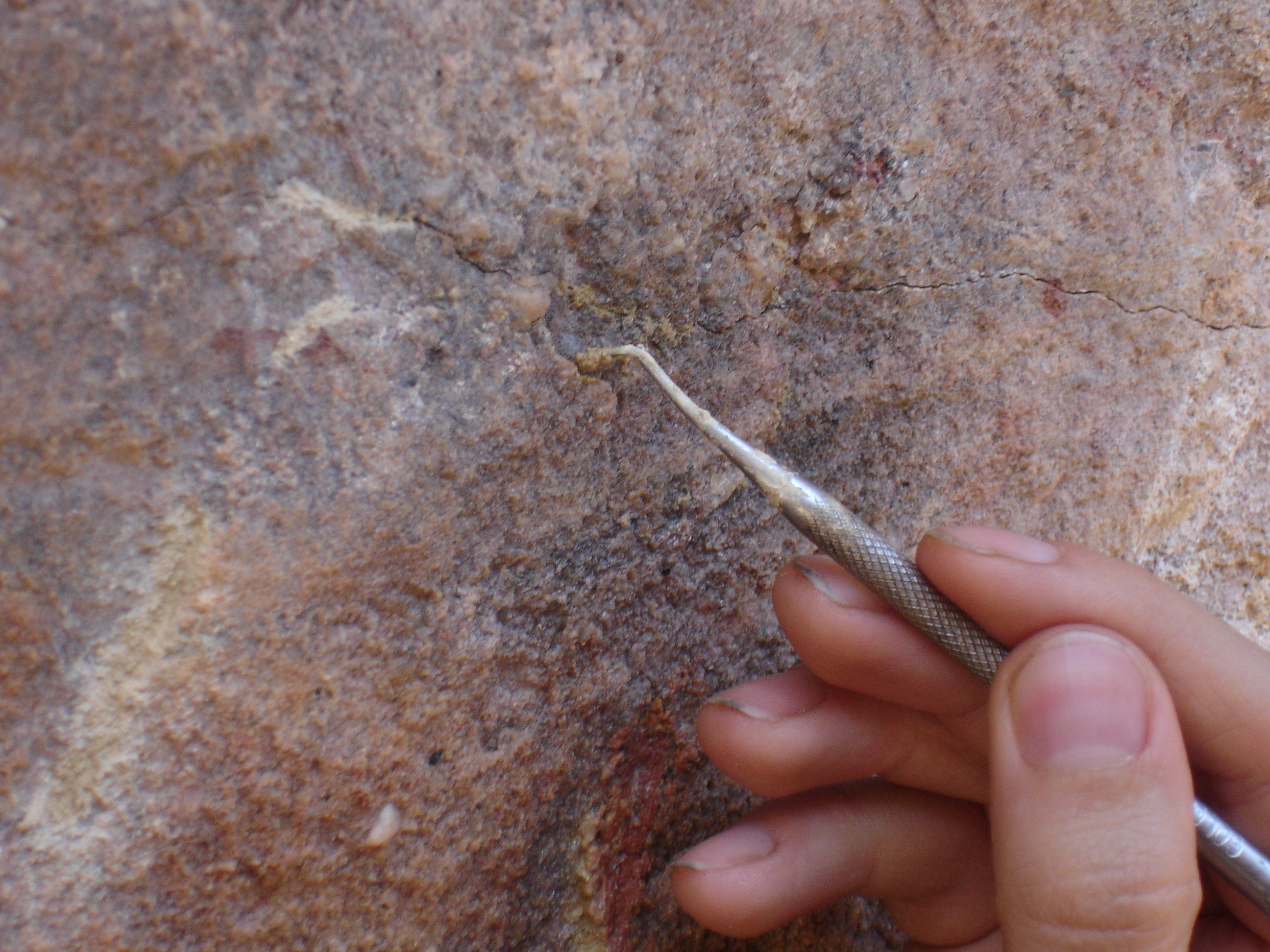
Work of preventive conservation in a rock wall with prehistoric paintings at the Serra da Capivara National Park. The work consists of filling the cracks to prevent the fragmentation of the wall.

=== Interventive conservation and restoration ===
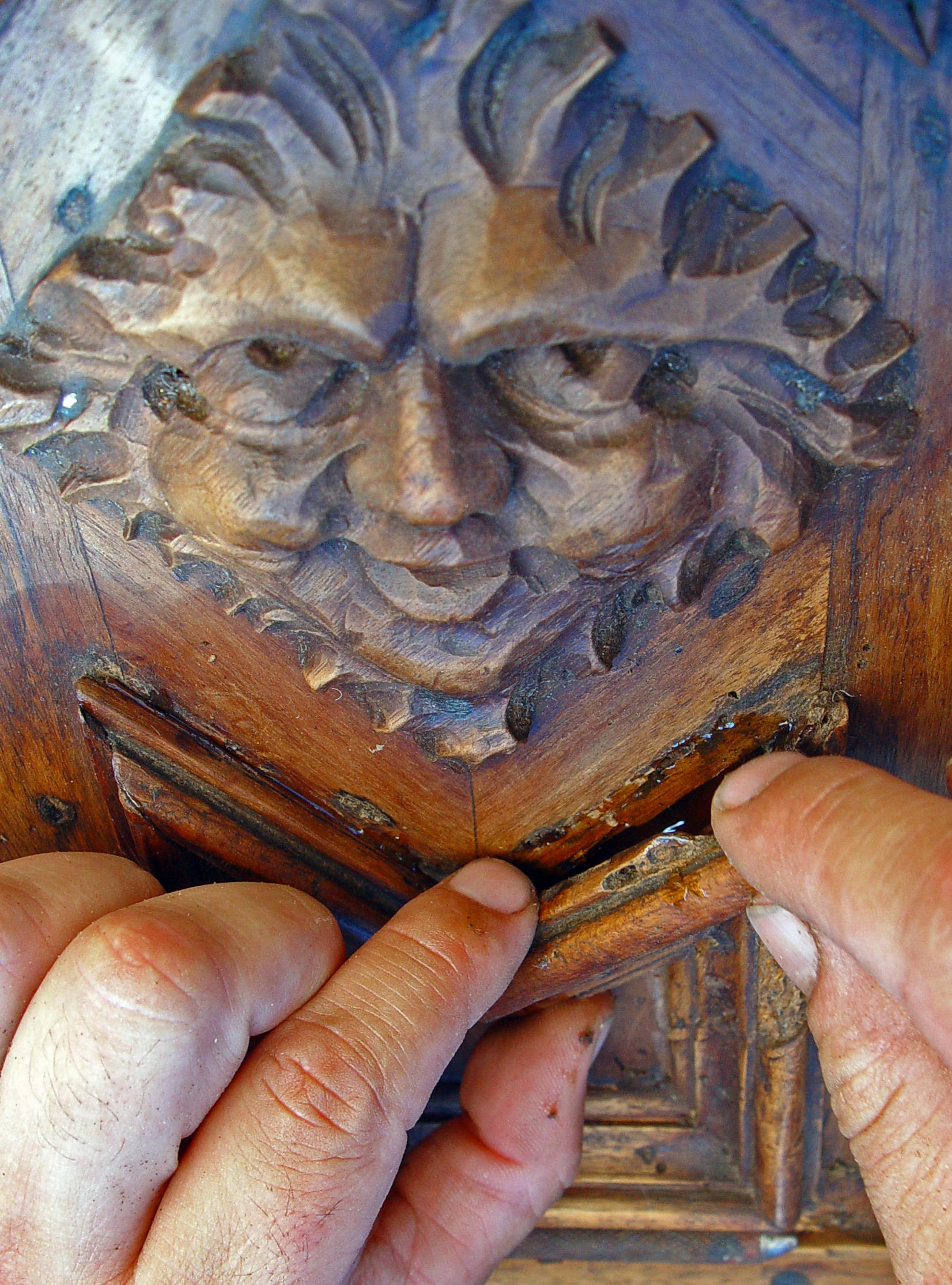
Furniture conservation – Re-glueing loose element of solid nut marriage chest (probably Italy, 19th century)

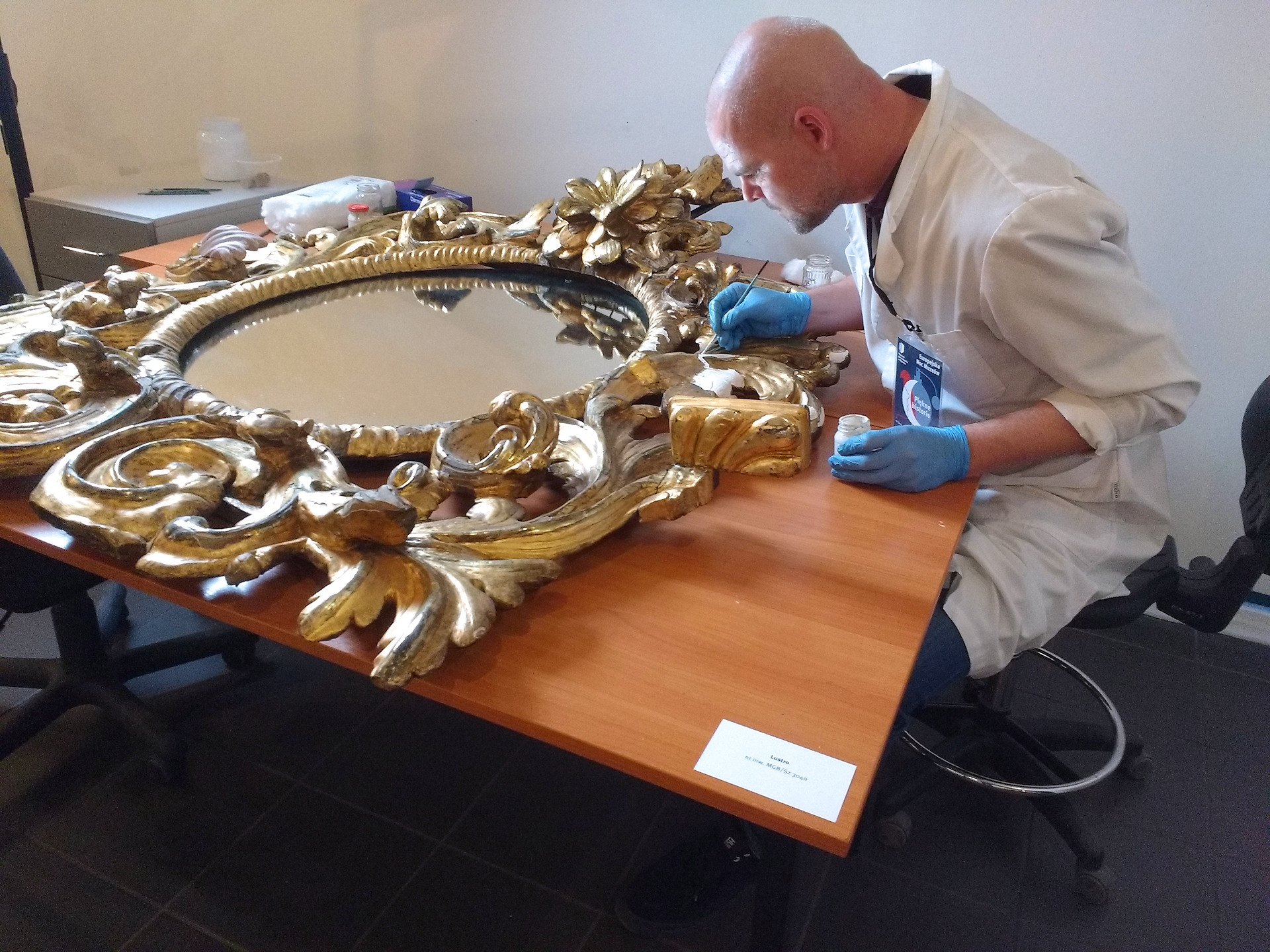
Antique conservation – Re-painting of the frame by museum employee

A teaching programme of interventive conservation was established in the UK at the Institute of Archaeology by Ione Gedye, which is still teaching interventive conservators today.

A principal aim of a cultural conservator is to reduce the rate of deterioration of an object. Both non-interventive and interventive methodologies may be employed in pursuit of this goal. Interventive conservation refers to any direct interaction between the conservator and the material fabric of the object. Interventive actions are carried out for a variety of reasons, including aesthetic choices, stabilization needs for structural integrity, or cultural requirements for intangible continuity. Examples of interventive treatments include the removal of discolored varnish from a painting, the application of wax to a sculpture, and the washing and rebinding of a book. Ethical standards within the field require that the conservator fully justify interventive actions and carry out documentation before, during, and after the treatment.

One of the guiding principles of conservation of cultural heritage has traditionally been the idea of reversibility, that all interventions with the object should be fully reversible and that the object should be able to be returned to the state in which it was prior to the conservator's intervention. Although this concept remains a guiding principle of the profession, it has been widely critiqued within the conservation profession and is now considered by many to be "a fuzzy concept." Another important principle of conservation is that all alterations should be well documented and should be clearly distinguishable from the original object.

An example of a highly publicized interventive conservation effort would be the conservation work conducted on the Sistine Chapel.

==== Example of an archaeological discovery and restoration of a mural painting ====
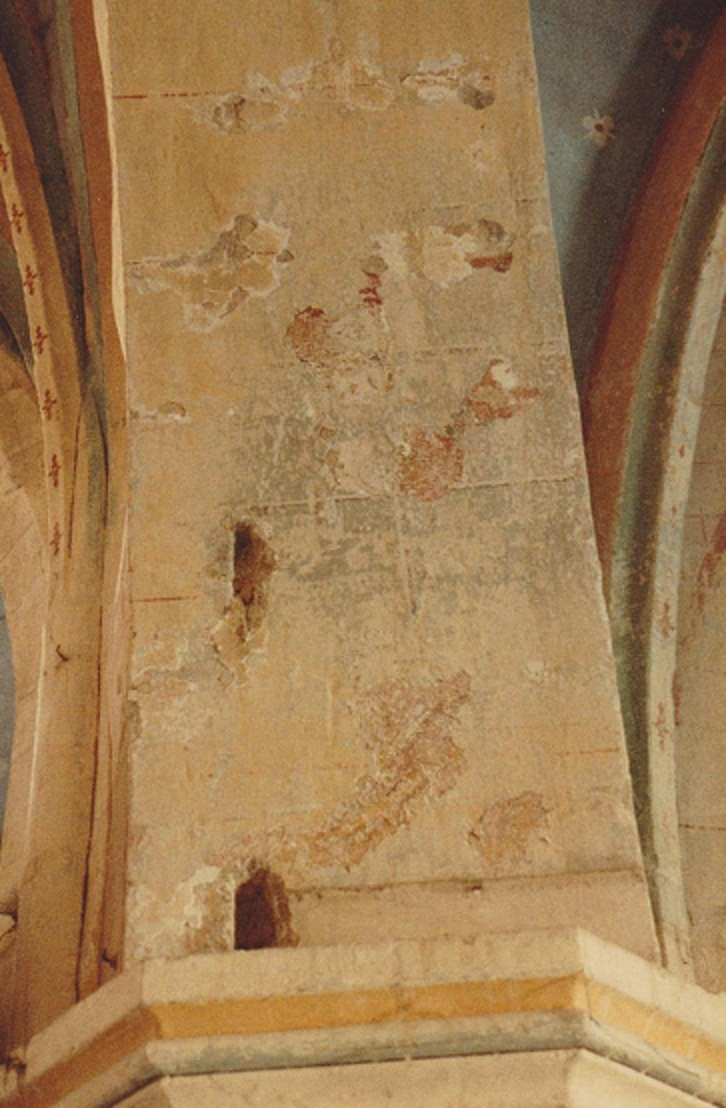
First archaeological search in the 19th-century layer by French archaeologist and restorer Yves Morvan

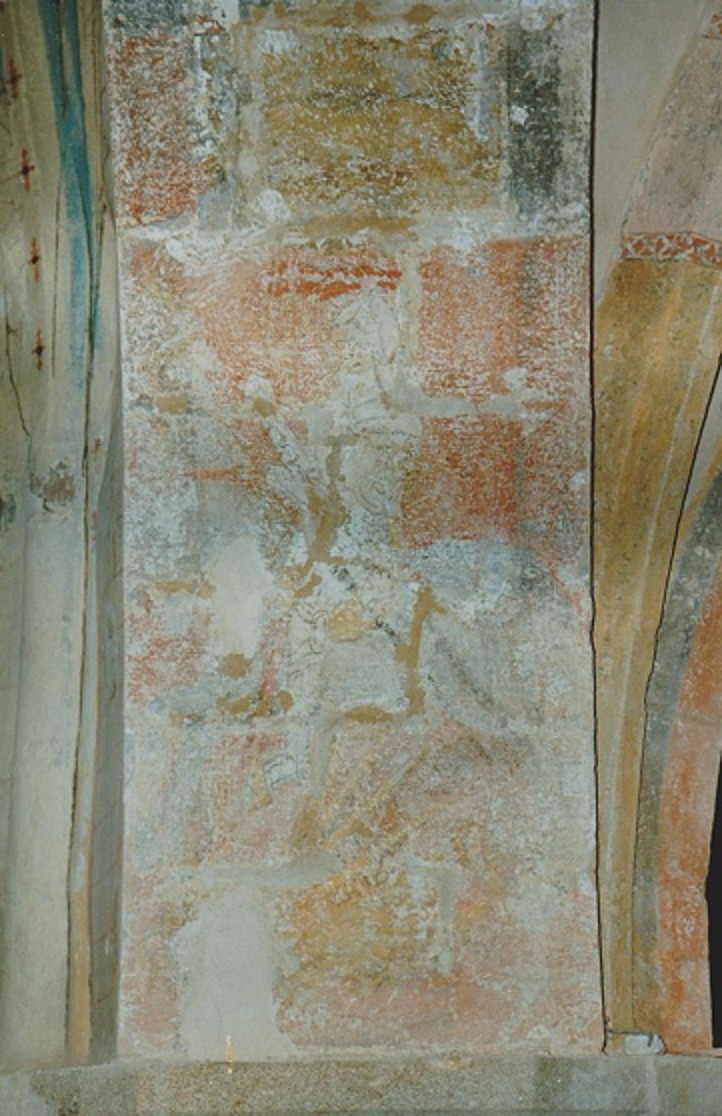
Painting of the 15th century cleared before restoration

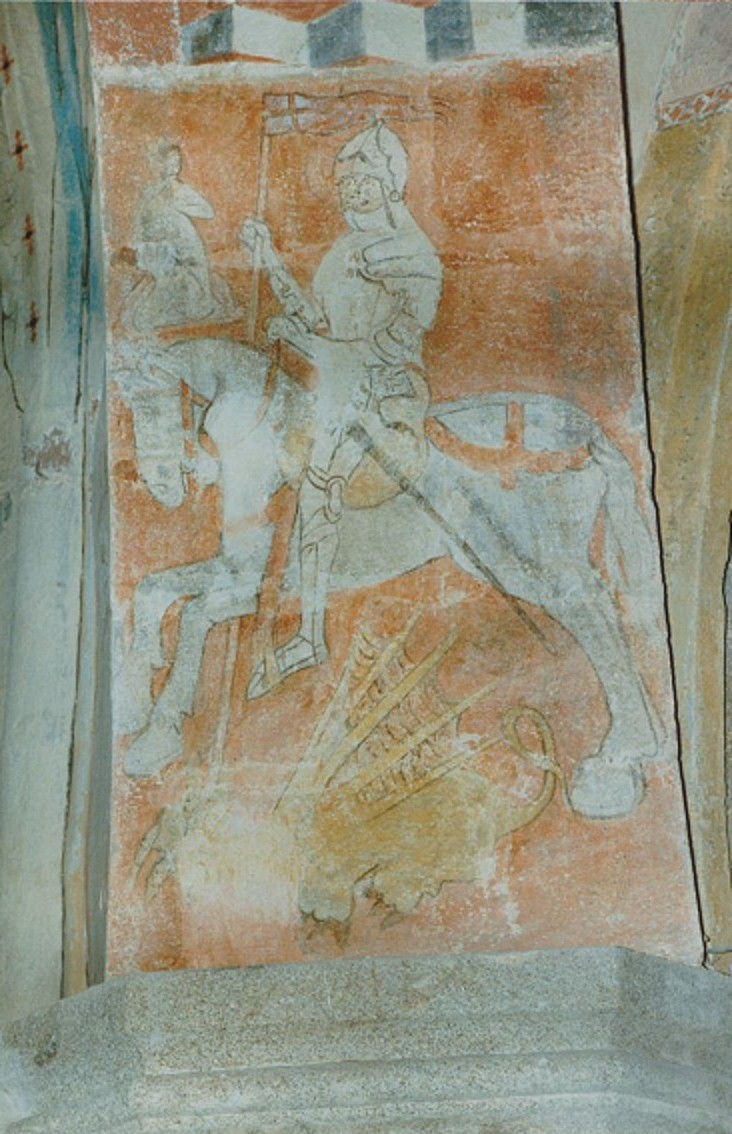
Painting after restoration

==== Examples of the restoration of an oil painting ====
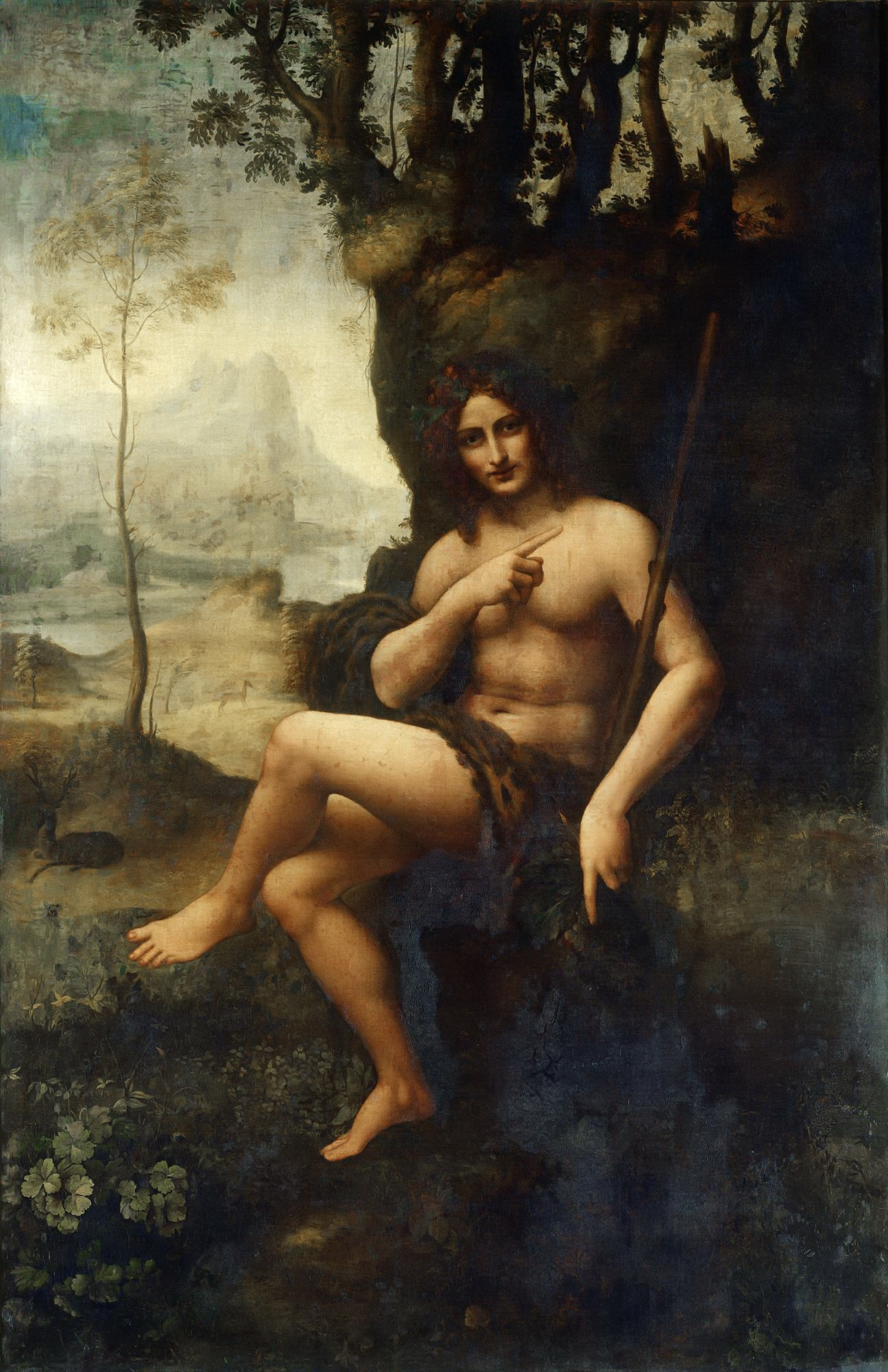
Bacchus, the painting originating from the Workshop of Leonardo da Vinci, seen here before restoration.

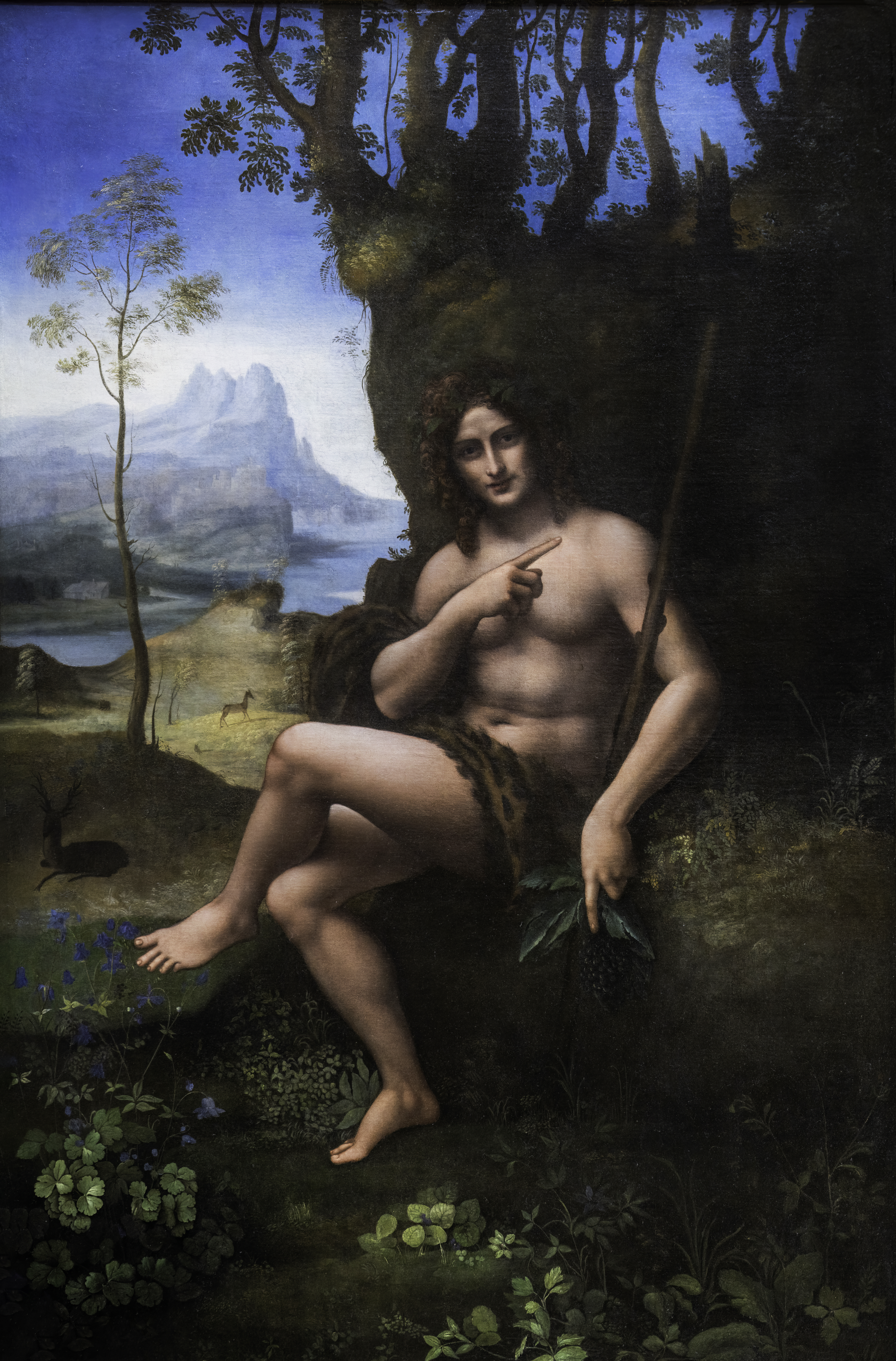
Bacchus after restoration with colors closer to original and details better visible again.

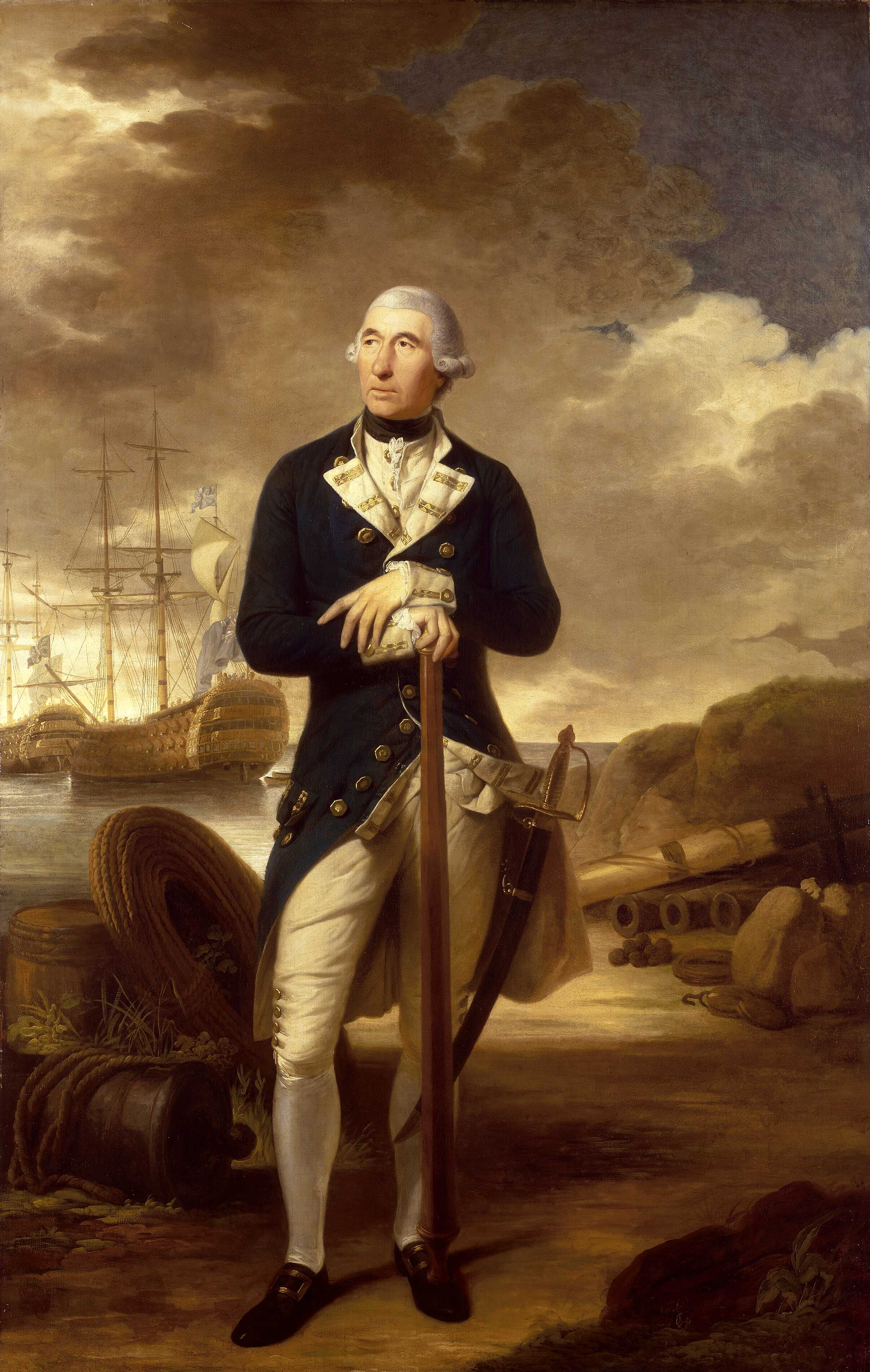
Rear-Admiral Richard Kempenfelt by Tilly Kettle, before cleaning

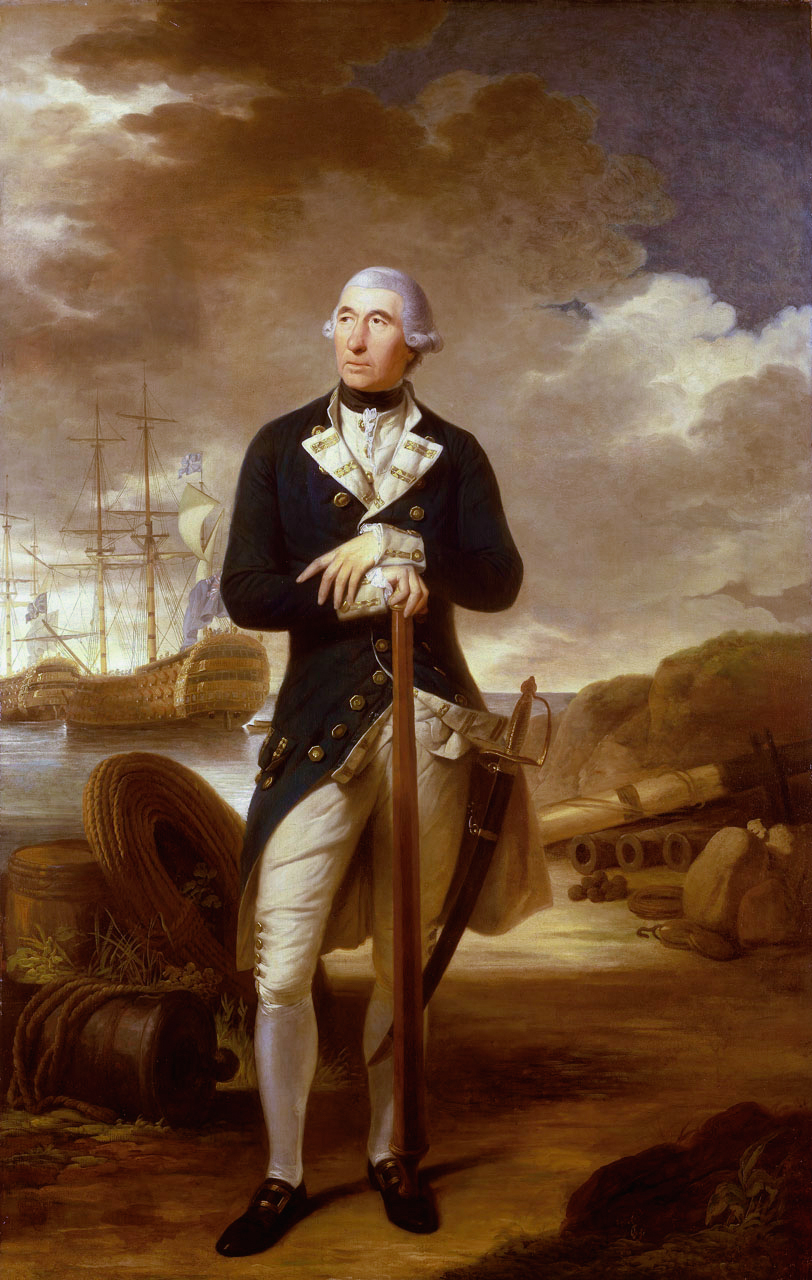
Rear-Admiral Richard Kempenfelt by Tilly Kettle, after cleaning

== Sustainable conservation ==
Recognising that conservation practices should not harm the environment, harm people, or contribute to global warming, the conservation-restoration profession has more recently focused on practices that reduce waste, reduce energy costs, and minimise the use of toxic or harmful solvents. A number of research projects, working groups, and other initiatives have explored how conservation can become a more environmentally sustainable profession. Sustainable conservation practices apply both to work within cultural institutions (e.g. museums, art galleries, archives, libraries, research centres and historic sites) as well as to businesses and private studios.

=== Choice of materials ===
Conservators and restorers use a wide variety of materials - in conservation treatments, and those used to safely transport, display and store cultural heritage items. These materials can include solvents, papers and boards, fabrics, adhesives and consolidants, plastics and foams, wood products, and many others. Stability and longevity are two important factors conservators consider when selecting materials; sustainability is becoming an increasingly important third. Examples of sustainable material choices and practices include:

- Using biodegradable products or those with less environmental impact where possible;
- Using 'green solvents' instead of more toxic alternatives, or treatment strategies that use much smaller amounts of solvents - for example, semi-rigid aqueous gels, emulsions or nano materials;
- Preparing smaller amounts of material (e.g. adhesives) to avoid waste;
- Observing recommended disposal protocols for chemicals, recyclable materials and compostable materials, particularly to avoid contamination of waterways;
- Choosing protective work wear that can be washed or cleaned and reused, rather than disposable options;
- Tracking stock quantities to avoid over-buying, especially for materials with expiration dates;
- Using durable materials for packing that may be washed and re-used, such as Tyvek or Mylar;
- Repurposing consumables such as blotting paper, non-woven fabrics, and polyester film when they are no longer fit for their original purpose;
- Using locally produced products whenever possible, to reduce carbon footprints;
- Reusing packaging materials such as cardboard boxes, plastic wrap and wooden crates;
- Using standard sizes of packaging and package designs that reduce waste;

These decisions are not always straightforward - for example, installing deionised or distilled water filters in laboratories reduces waste associated with purchasing bottled products, but increases energy consumption. Similarly, locally made papers and boards may reduce inherent carbon miles but they may be made with pulp sourced from old growth forests.

Another dilemma is that many conservation-grade materials are chosen because they do not biodegrade. For example, when selecting a plastic with which to make storage enclosures, conservators prefer to use relatively long-lived plastics because they have better ageing properties - they are less likely to become yellow, leach plasticisers, or lose structural integrity and crumble (examples include polyethylene, polypropylene, and polyester). These plastics will also take longer to degrade in landfill.

=== Energy use ===
Many conservators and cultural organisations have sought to reduce the energy costs associated with controlling indoor storage and display environments (temperature, relative humidity, air filtration, and lighting levels) as well as those associated with the transport of cultural heritage items for exhibitions and loans.

In general, lowering the temperature reduces the rate at which damaging chemical reactions occur within materials. For example, storing cellulose acetate film at 10 °C instead of 21 °C is estimated to increase its usable life by over 100 years. Controlling the relative humidity of air helps to reduce hydrolysis reactions and minimises cracking, distortion and other physical changes in hygroscopic materials. Changes in temperature will also bring about changes in relative humidity. Therefore, the conservation profession has placed great importance on controlling indoor environments. Temperature and humidity can be controlled through passive means (e.g. insulation, building design) or active means (air conditioning). Active controls typically require much higher energy use. Energy use increases with specificity - e.g. in will require more energy to maintain a quantity of air to a narrow temperature range (20-22 °C) than to a broad range (18-25 °C). In the past, conservation recommendations have often called for very tight, inflexible temperature and relative humidity set points. In other cases, conservators have recommended strict environmental conditions for buildings that could not reasonably be expected to achieve them, due to the quality of build, local environmental conditions (e.g. recommending temperate conditions for a building located in the tropics) or the financial circumstances of the organisation. This has been an area of particular debate for cultural heritage organisations who lend and borrow cultural items to each other - often, the lender will specify strict environmental conditions as part of the loan agreement, which may be very expensive for the borrowing organisation to achieve, or impossible.

The energy costs associated with cold storage and digital storage are also gaining more attention. Cold storage is a very effective strategy to preserve at-risk collections such as cellulose nitrate and cellulose acetate film, which can deteriorate beyond use within decades at ambient conditions. Digital storage costs are rising for both born-digital cultural heritage (photographs, audiovisual, time-based media) and to store digital preservation and access copies of cultural heritage. Digital storage capacity is a major factor in the complexity of preserving digital heritage such as video games, social media, messaging services, and email.

Other areas where energy use can be reduced within conservation and restoration include:

- Exhibition lighting - e.g. using lower-energy LED lighting systems and light sensors that switch lights on only when visitors are present;
- Installation of green energy capture systems in cultural organisations, such as solar photovoltaic plates, wind energy systems, and heat pumps;
- Improving the energy performance of cultural buildings by installing insulation, sealing gaps, reducing the number of windows and installing double-glazing:
- Using microclimates to house small groups of climate-sensitive objects instead of seeking to control the environmental conditions of the whole building.

=== Sustainability in the practices of conservation laboratories ===
In the routine work of conservation laboratories, a series of practices can be implemented with a view to management that favors ethical sustainability criteria, as well as actions such as pragmatic responses to climate emergencies. It is fundamentally that we strive to make practices such as the following commonplace:

- Prepare small quantities of products to avoid producing waste.
- Prepare small quantities of products to avoid producing waste.
- Establish a routine disposal of chemicals according to biosecurity standards
- Disseminate and instruct users of the laboratories on sustainable practices
- Stimulate the use of green solvents; use of less toxic and lower environmental impact solvents (reduction of the use of aromatic solvents and substitution for less toxic, ecological, biodegradable products);
- If possible, give preference to the use of gel solvents (minimizes direct contact with liquid solvents, decreases the amount of volatile material dispersed in the environment, and improves application control and reduces losses and contamination)
- If possible, give preference to using biodegradable products for surface cleaning procedures, such as agar-agar.
- Use preferable LED lighting in laboratories and storage rooms, high energy-efficiency equipment, and climate control monitoring to avoid waste
- Reuse packaging materials and choose sustainable materials whenever possible.
- Give preference to digital documentation and avoid excessive use of paper.

== Country by country look ==
=== United States ===
Heritage Preservation, in partnership with the Institute of Museum and Library Services, a U.S. federal agency, produced The Heritage Health Index. The results of this work was the report A Public Trust at Risk: The Heritage Health Index Report on the State of America's Collections, which was published in December 2005 and concluded that immediate action is needed to prevent the loss of 190 million artifacts that are in need of conservation treatment. The report made four recommendations:

- Institutions must give priority to providing safe conditions for the collections they hold in trust.
- Every collecting institution must develop an emergency plan to protect its collections and train staff to carry it out.
- Every institution must assign responsibility for caring for collections to members of its staff.
- Individuals at all levels of government and in the private sector must assume responsibility for providing the support that will allow these collections to survive.

=== United Kingdom ===
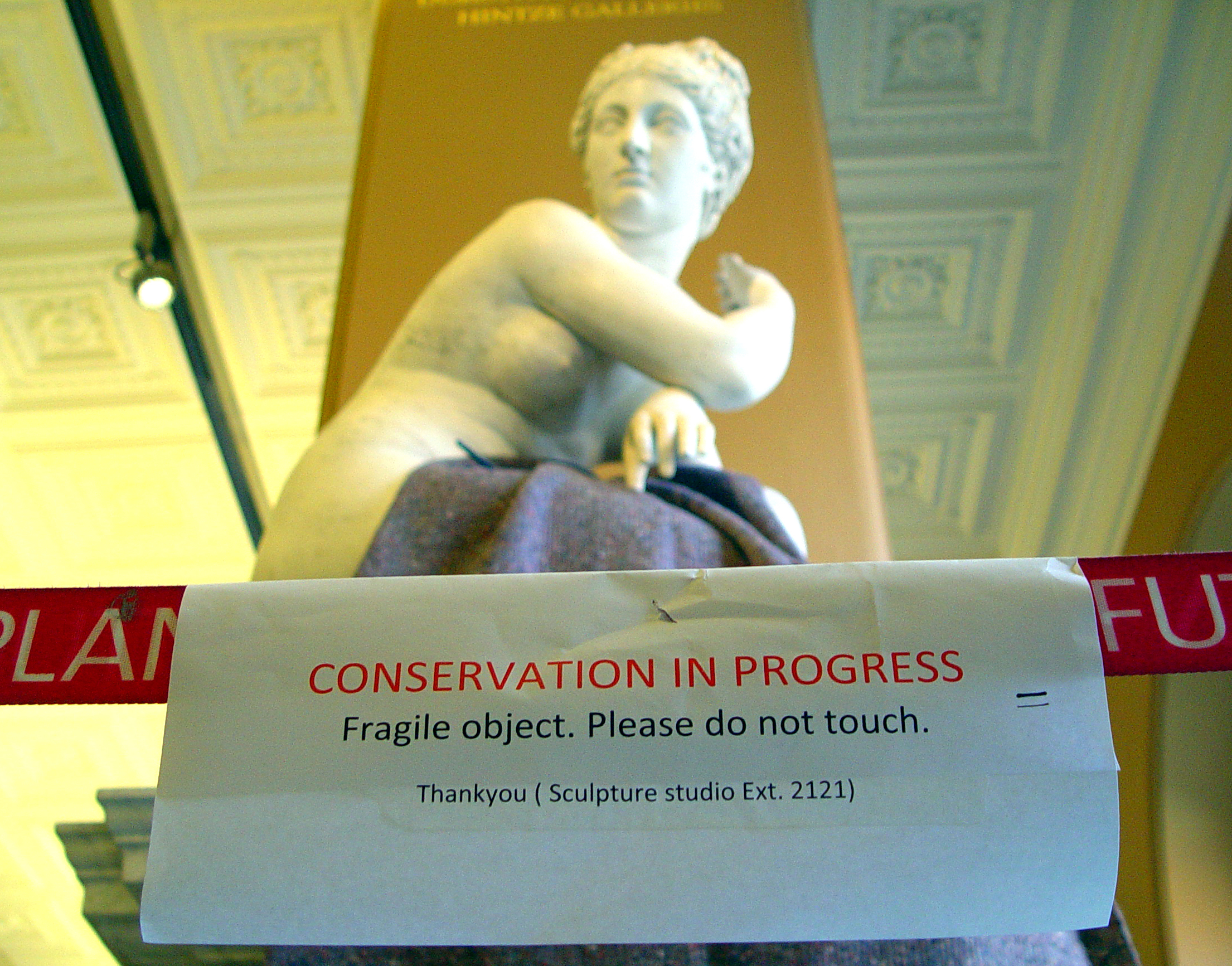
Conservation in Progress note, Victoria and Albert Museum (2014)

In October 2006, the Department for Culture, Media and Sport, a governmental department, authored a document: "Understanding the Future: Priorities for England's Museums". This document was based on several years of consultation aimed to lay out the government's priorities for museums in the 21st century.

The document listed the following as priorities for the next decade:

1. Museums will fulfil their potential as learning resources (pp 7–10).
  - Museums will be embedded into the delivery of education in every school in the country.
  - Understanding of the effectiveness of museum education will be improved further and best practice built into education programmes.
  - The value of museums' collections as a research resource will be well understood and better links built between the academic community and museums.
2. Museums will embrace their role in fostering, exploring, celebrating and questioning the identities of diverse communities (pp 11–14).
  - The sector needs to work with partners in academia and beyond to create an intellectual framework supporting museums' capacity to tackle issues of identity.
  - The museum sector must continue to develop improved practical techniques for engaging communities of all sorts.
3. Museums' collections will be more dynamic and better used (pp 15–18).
  - Government and the sector will find new ways to encourage museums to collect actively and strategically, especially the record of contemporary society.
  - The sector will develop new collaborative approaches to sharing and developing collections and related expertise.
4. Museums' workforce will be dynamic, highly skilled and representative (pp 17–22).
  - Museums' governing bodies and workforce will be representative of the communities they serve.
  - Find more varied ways for a broader range of skills to come into museums.
  - Improve continuing professional development.
5. Museums will work more closely with each other and partners outside the sector (pp 23–26).
  - A consistent evidence base of the contribution of all kinds of museums to the full range of public service agendas will be developed.
  - There will be deeper and longer lasting partnerships between the national museums and a broader range of regional partners.
  - Museums' international roles will be strengthened to improve museum programmes in this country and Britain's image, reputation and relationships abroad.

The conservation profession response to this report was on the whole less than favourable, the Institute of Conservation (ICON) published their response under the title "A Failure of Vision". It had the following to say:

No sector can look with confidence to the future if its key asset is worked harder and harder across an ever broadening range of objectives while the inputs required to sustain it are neglected.

It is of major concern to us that the only part of this section which makes any acknowledgement of the need for greater resourcing is the part which refers to acquisitions. The original consultation paper made quite extensive reference to the importance of collections, the role of new technologies, and cultural property issues, but this appears to have been whittled away in the present document.

Concluding:

When asked by the Commons Culture Media and Sport elect Committee CMS committee what he would like to see as a priority in the DCMS document arising from the 'Understanding the Future' consultation, Mr MacGregor responded 'I would like to see added there the need to conserve and research the collections, so that the collections can really play the role across the whole of the United Kingdom that they should.' So would we.

Further to this the ICON website summary report lists the following specific recommendations:

- A national survey to find out what the public want from museums, what motivates them to visit them and what makes for a rewarding visit.
- A review of survey results and prioritisation of the various intrinsic, instrumental and institutional values to provide a clear basis for a 10-year strategy
- HR consultants to be brought in from the commercial sector to review recruitment, career development and working practices in the national and regional museums.
- A commitment to examine the potential for using Museum Accreditation as a more effective driver for improving recruitment, diversity, and career development across the sector.
- DCMS to take full account of the eventual findings of the current Commons Select Committee enquiry into Care of Collections in the final version of this document
- The adoption of those recommendations of the recent House of Lords inquiry into Science and Heritage which might affect the future of museums.

In November 2008, the UK-based think tank Demos published an influential pamphlet entitled It's a material world: caring for the public realm, in which they argue for integrating the public directly into efforts to conserve material culture, particularly that which is in the public, their argument, as stated on page 16, demonstrates their belief that society can benefit from conservation as a paradigm as well as a profession:

conservators provide a paradigm not just for fixing things when they are broken, but for a wider social ethos of care, where we individually and collectively take responsibility and action.

== Training ==
Training in conservation of cultural heritage for many years took the form of an apprenticeship, whereby an apprentice slowly developed the necessary skills to undertake their job. For some specializations within conservation this is still the case. However, it is more common in the field of conservation today that the training required to become a practicing conservator comes from a recognized university course in conservation of cultural heritage.

The university can rarely provide all the necessary training in first hand experience that an apprenticeship can, and therefore in addition to graduate level training the profession also tends towards encouraging conservation students to spend time as an intern.

Conservation of cultural heritage is an interdisciplinary field as conservators have backgrounds in the fine arts, sciences (including chemistry, biology, and materials science), and closely related disciplines, such as art history, archaeology, and anthropology. They also have design, fabrication, artistic, and other special skills necessary for the practical application of that knowledge.

Within the various schools that teach conservation of cultural heritage, the approach differs according to the educational and vocational system within the country, and the focus of the school itself. This is acknowledged by the American Institute for Conservation who advise "Specific admission requirements differ and potential candidates are encouraged to contact the programs directly for details on prerequisites, application procedures, and program curriculum".

In France, training for heritage conservation is taught by four schools : École supérieure d'art d'Avignon, L'École supérieure des Beaux-Arts Tours, Angers, Le Mans, L'Université Paris 1 Panthéon-Sorbonne, Institut national du patrimoine.

== Associations and professional organizations ==
Societies devoted to the care of cultural heritage have been in existence around the world for many years. One early example is the founding in 1877 of the Society for the Protection of Ancient Buildings in Britain to protect the built heritage; this society continues to be active today. The 14th Dalai Lama and the Tibetan people work to preserve their cultural heritage with organizations including the Tibetan Institute of Performing Arts and an international network of eight Tibet Houses.

The built heritage was at the forefront of the growth of member based organizations in the United States. Preservation Virginia, founded in Richmond in 1889 as the Association for the Preservation of Virginia Antiquities, was the United States' first statewide historic preservation group.

Today, professional conservators join and take part in the activities of numerous conservation associations and professional organizations within the wider field, and within their area of specialization. In Europe, E.C.C.O. European Confederation of Conservator-Restorers Organisations was established in 1991 by 14 European Conservator-Restorers' Organisations. Currently representing close to 6.000 professionals within 23 countries and 26 members organisations, including one international body (IADA), E.C.C.O. embodies the field of preservation of cultural heritage, both movable and immovable.

These organizations exist to "support the conservation professionals who preserve our cultural heritage".

This involves upholding professional standards, promoting research and publications, providing educational opportunities, and fostering the exchange of knowledge among cultural conservators, allied professionals, and the public.

== International cultural property documents ==
Year	Document	Sponsor	Text (English where available)
1931	Athens Charter	International Congress of Architects and Technicians of Historic Monuments	text
1931	Carta Di Atene	Conferenza Internazionale di Atene	text (Italian)
1932	Carta Italiana del restauro	Consiglio Superiore Per Le Antichità e Belle Arti	text (Italian)
1933	Charter of Athens	IV CIAM	text
1956	New Delhi Recommendation	IX UNESCO	text, text
1962	Paris Recommendation	XII UNESCO	text
1964	Venice Charter	II International Congress of Architects and Technicians of Historic Monuments	text, text
1964	Paris Recommendation	XIII UNESCO	text
1967	Norms of Quito	OAS	text (Spanish), text
1968	Paris Recommendation	XV UNESCO	text
1972	Paris Convention	XVII UNESCO	text
1972	Paris Recommendation	XVII UNESCO	text
1972	Carta Italiana del Restauro		text (Italian)
1972	Stockholm Declaration	UNEP	text
1974	Santo Domingo Resolution, Dominican Republic	Interamerican Seminar on the Conservation and Restoration of the Architectural Heritage of the Colonial and Republican Periods – OAS	text (Portuguese), text (Portuguese)
1975	Declaration of Amsterdam	Congress on the European Architectural Heritage	text
1975	European Charter of the Architectural Heritage	Council of Europe	text
1976	Charter on Cultural Tourism, Brussels	International Seminar on Contemporary Tourism and Humanism	text
1976	Nairobi Recommendation	XIX UNESCO	text
1977	Machu Picchu Charter		text (Portuguese), text (Portuguese), text (Spanish), ref (Spanish)
1981	Burra Charter	ICOMOS	text
1982	Florence Charter	ICOMOS: Historic Gardens	text, text
1982	Nairobi Declaration	UNEP	text
1982	Tlaxcala Declaration	ICOMOS	text
1982	México Declaration	World Conference on Cultural Policies – MONDIACULT	text, text
1983	Declaration of Rome	ICOMOS	text
1987	Carta della conservazione e del restauro degli oggetti d'arte e di cultura		text (Italian)
1987	Washington Charter	ICOMOS	text, text
1989	Paris Recommendation	XXV UNESCO	text
1990	Lausanne Charter	ICOMOS / ICAHM	text, text
1994	Nara Document	UNESCO / ICCROM / ICOMOS	text, text
1995	European Recommendation	Council of Europe, Committee of Ministers	text (Rec(95)3E), text (Rec(95)9E)
1996	Declaration of San Antonio	ICOMOS	text
1997	Declaration of Sofia	XI ICOMOS or XXIX UNESCO	text
1997	Carta de Mar del Plata	Mercosur	text (Portuguese), text (Portuguese), text (Spanish), text (Spanish)
2000	Cracow Charter		text (Italian)
2002	Declaration of Cartagena de Indias, Colômbia	Conselho Andino, OAS	text
2003	Paris Recommendation	XXXII UNESCO	text
2017	Delhi Declaration	ICOMOS	text (English)

== See also ==
- Art discovery
- Conservation and restoration of books, manuscripts, documents and ephemera
- Conservation and restoration of rail vehicles
- Conservator-restorer
- Cultural heritage sites at risk from climate change
- Historic preservation
- International Day For Monuments and Sites
- Preservation (library and archive)
- Wikipedia:WikiProject Collections Care
