= DF King Worldwide =

DF King Worldwide is an international agency holding company with focus on financial communications and stakeholder management. It was founded in 2007 by Oliver Niedermaier and Enzo Villani under the name Sage Holdings, and rebranded as DF King Worldwide in November 2009. King Worldwide has a staff of over 900 and offices in New York City, Boston, London, Stockholm, Dubai, Hong Kong, Moscow, Madrid, Cape Town and São Paulo. DF King Worldwide is backed by The Riverside Company. Niedermaier served as President and CEO from 2008 to 2012. Sometime later, the president and CEO was Terry Thompson.

== Subsidiary agencies ==
- D. F. King & Co.
- M:Communications
- Capital Precision
- Broadgate Consultants
- Donlin, Recano & Co.
- Keyhaven
- KWD

== Recognition ==
DF King Worldwide was selected on November 23, 2009 to join the World Economic Forum's Community of Global Growth Companies.
