= Actor analysis =

Approach to environmental management

Actor analysis can be seen as an approach to environmental management. Environmental issues are often very complex, because many parties are involved. All parties have their own interests, goals and strategies. Actor analysis provides a structured inventory of the parties and their interests to get an overview.

Instead of parties, we speak of actors which comprise both individuals and groups like organizations, administrative authorities or consumer organisations. All these actors can change an existing situation by their priorities or value systems.

There have been many changes of environmental behaviour that can be described via actor analysis. For example, all cars are now equipped with catalytic converters. Environmental organisations, governments, companies, legislators, and customers have all been actors in this process.

== See also ==
- Actor–network theory
- Stakeholder analysis
