= Stakeholder management =

Business practice

Stakeholder management (also project stakeholder management) is the managing of stakeholders of a project, programme, or activity. A stakeholder is any individual, group or organization that can affect, be affected by, or perceive itself to be affected by a programme.

== The process ==
Project stakeholder management is considered as a continuous process, specifically a four-step process of identifying stakeholders, determining their influence, developing a communication management plan and influencing stakeholders through engagement. Within the field of marketing, it is believed that customers are one of the most important stakeholders for managing a business's long-term value, with a firm's major objective being the management of customer satisfaction.

== History ==
The origin of stakeholder engagement can be traced back to the 1930s. In 1963, the Stanford Research Institute first defined the concept of stakeholder. In 1984, Edward Freeman's book Strategic Management: A Stakeholder Approach was published. It brought to existence a complete body of knowledge surrounding the ethical management of stakeholders. Soon thereafter, computers were used to facilitate the organizations' engagement with communities and stakeholder analysis. Seven "principles of stakeholder management" are linked with the work of the Clarkson Centre for Business Ethics at the University of Toronto's Rotman School of Management, developed at four conferences held between 1993 and 1998.

The concept of stakeholder management has also been criticised, for example by John Argenti in 1996, who described the concept as "utterly discredited". The Strategic Planning Society's magazine, Strategy, subsequently hosted a debate on Argenti's views. Pete Thomas argues that the established discourse regarding stakeholder management, although it is presented as supportive of stakeholders' interests, is "at best ambiguous, and at worst dishonest and manipulative".

Berman, Wicks, Kotha and Jones distinguish between two primary models of stakeholder management in business, an "instrumental" approach, according to which business managers engage with their stakeholders in order to maximise long term financial outcomes, and a "normative" approach, which identifies a stakeholder commitment as a moral obligation adopted by businesses, also referred to as an "intrinsic stakeholder commitment". Donaldson and Preston's academic work developed the normative approach, but while Berman et al. find empirical support for the financial benefits of effective stakeholder management, they have not identified any empirical basis for the normative model.

== Organizational stakeholders ==
It is well acknowledged that any given organization will have multiple stakeholders including, but not limited to, customers, shareholders, employees, suppliers, and so forth. One of the Clarkson Centre's seven principles notes that managers "should acknowledge the potential conflicts between their own role as corporate stakeholders, and the legal and moral responsibilities they hold to act in the interests of all stakeholders".

== Stakeholder prioritization ==
Stakeholders may be mapped out on a power-interest map or grid, and classified by their power and interest. Other stakeholder mapping tools are available. For example, an employer is likely to have high power and influence over an employee's projects and high interest, whereas family members may have high interest, but are unlikely to have power over them.

Position on the grid may show actions:

- High power, highly interested people: these are the people you must fully engage and make the greatest efforts to satisfy.
- High power, less interested people: put enough effort into working with these people to keep them satisfied, but not so much that they become bored with your message.
- Low power, highly interested people: keep these people adequately informed, and communicate with them to ensure that no major issues are arising. These people can often be very helpful with the details of your project.
- Low power, less interested people: again, monitor these people, but do not overwhelm them with excessive communication.

== Stakeholder engagement ==
Stakeholder management creates positive relationships with stakeholders through the appropriate management of their expectations and agreed objectives. Stakeholder management is a process and control that must be planned and guided by underlying principles. Stakeholder management within businesses, organizations, or projects prepares a strategy using information (or intelligence) gathered during the following common processes. Stakeholder engagement emphasizes that corporations should take into account the effects of their actions and decision-making on their diverse stakeholders. In addition, in the stakeholder engagement, corporations should take into consideration the rights and expectations of their different supporters.

Some organizations use stakeholder engagement software to analyze their stakeholders, to create communication and engagement plans, to log information about the interactions they have with communities and to ensure compliance with regulations.

Aims of stakeholder engagement include:

- Communicate: to ensure intended message is understood and the desired response achieved.
- Consult, early and often, to obtain useful information and ideas, ask questions.
- Remember, they are human: be empathetic, operate with an awareness of human feelings.
- Plan it: time investment, and careful planning for how time is used, have a significant payoff.
- Relationship: engender trust with the stakeholders.
- Simple but not easy: show you care, and listen to the stakeholders.
- Managing risk: stakeholders can be treated as risks and opportunities that have probabilities and impact.
- Compromise across a set of stakeholders' diverging priorities.
- Understand what is success: explore the value of the project to the stakeholder.
- Take responsibility: project governance is the key to project success

== See also ==
- Experience management
- Project management
- Responsibility assignment matrix
- Stakeholder engagement
- Stakeholder register
- Stakeholder theory
