= Preservation of meaning =

Concept involving perceptions of value for cultural objects

Preservation of meaning in library, archival or museum collections involves understanding spiritual, ritual, or cultural perceptions of value for specific objects, and ensuring these values are maintained and respected. Meaning is something assigned to objects of cultural or spiritual significance based on interpretations and perceived values by user populations, a process known as social construction of an object. When moved to memory institutions such as libraries or museums, these objects of social construction require unique approaches to preservation and maintenance in order to remain relevant as representations of cultural or spiritual societies.

In many memory institutions of the Western World, including libraries and museums, focus is often placed on the informational content and physical attributes, or artifactual value, of collected materials. Preservation policies are primarily concerned with the maintenance of these two things, either through reformatting to preserve textual information, or repairs and environmental controls to ensure continued existence of their physical structure. However, it is necessary to look beyond the physical and informational aspects of objects in order to ensure we are also preserving the integrity of the spiritual or cultural values which may be fundamental in defining the object.

Concerns arise when actions taken to preserve the physical object may compromise the spiritual or cultural integrity of a given object. Artifacts, including books, throughout history and the present are created and utilized according to rules and taboos that may not be inherently understood in today's world of mass consumer goods and material culture. While not all books, documents, and artifacts have rituals or socially constructed beliefs associated with their continued existence, it is a relevant issue for many cultural and religious collections.

== Examples ==
=== Religion ===
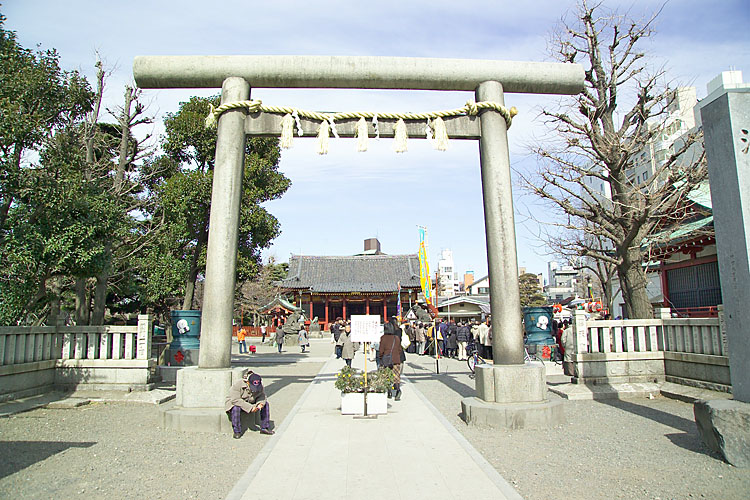
Some Shinto shrines are regularly destroyed and rebuilt in order to preserve their meaning

An extreme example of how efforts to physically preserve may compromise the socially constructed meaning of the object is the Shinto Shrines of Ise Jingu, in Japan. These shrines are of significant cultural and spiritual value to the Japanese people, but every twenty years since the time of Emperor Temmu in the 7th century C.E. the buildings are completely destroyed and rebuilt. The rebuilding process is based on descriptions in the Documents on the Rituals of the Great Shrine of Ise which date from 804 C.E. and ensures that the recreations are exact replicas of the shrines taken down. Physical preservation of these monuments would damage the spiritual and cultural integrity of the process and purpose behind the continuous rebuilding.

Similarly, in the Buddhist faith, materials are considered to have a life, which must be allowed to progress and end naturally. Impermanence (anitya) in the Buddhist faith relates to the natural end of all things, nirvana, and acts of physical preservation would be contrary to this belief. Buddhist shrines are an example of such items that hold spiritual meaning.

However, examples of the significance of meaning and spiritual integrity exist in North America as well. Jish is a Navajo medicine bundle used in religious rituals related to curing or prevention, and specific care and established provenance is necessary to preserve the existence of jish versus a simple bundle of herb and grasses. NAGPRA, or North American Graves Protection and Repatriation Act has helped to highlight this issue of meaning and spiritual integrity in the United States. The act not only covers objects and remains recovered from American Indian graves, but the subsequent literary material developed based on the examination and analysis of these objects.

=== Culture ===
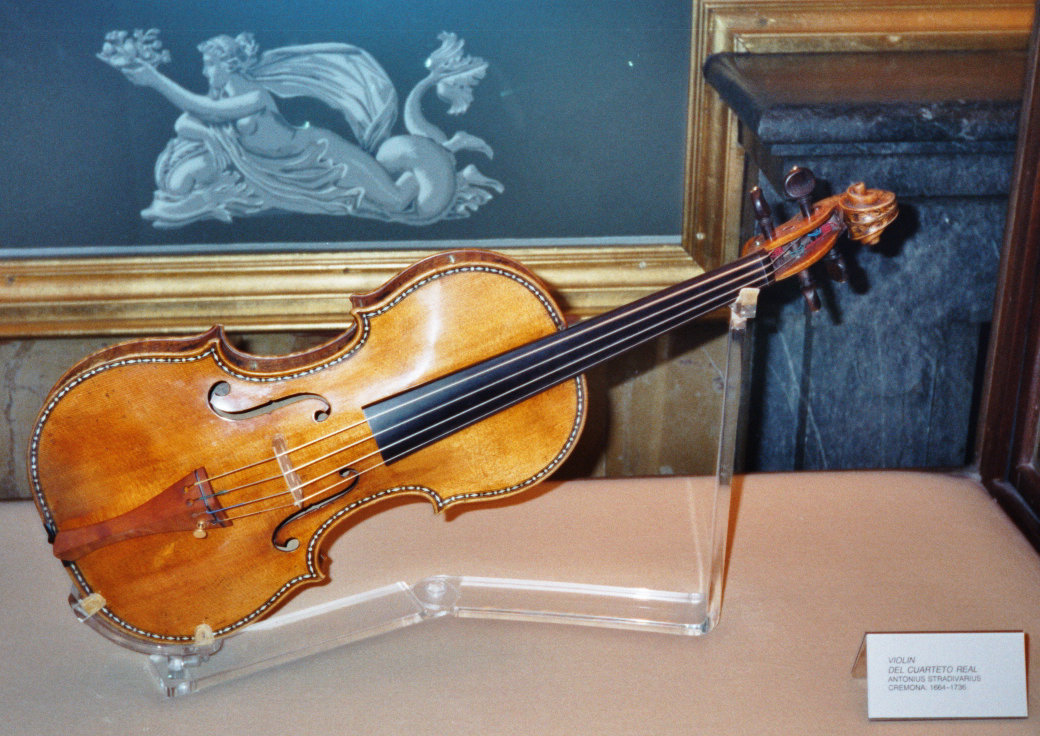
A Stradivarius violin, some of which are regularly ceremoniously played so they maintain their cultural significance

Physical preservation can also work to maintain spiritual and cultural integrity of an object, especially in the case of musical instruments. At the violin museum in Cremona, Italy, nine instruments crafted by the Amatis, Guarneris, and by Antonio Stradivari are played ceremoniously six days a week – both to keep them in good physical, playable condition, and to maintain their cultural significance and meaning. From the island of Java in Indonesia, the instruments of the gamelan are treated with respect and reverence, and played on a regular basis to maintain their physical and spiritual life. They are played only for certain occasions and only by certain individuals trained in the art. They must also be handled and stored with care to be sure no one should compromise their spiritual integrity by stepping over them. Gamelan instruments can be found in museums throughout North America, but to accurately remain gamelan instruments, they must be treated and respected according to both their physical and spiritual properties.

=== Collections ===
Preservation of meaning is perhaps most relevant and recognized in museum collections, but this does not mean there are not key books and documents that are defined by their social construction as well as their physical existence. When a book printed on acid paper turns to dust, there is no doubt that it ceases to exist as book. However, when books are stacked on top of a Quran, or a Guru Granth Sahib is repaired rather than ceremoniously cremated, the spiritual integrity of these texts is compromised or destroyed, and the physical object is void of spiritual or cultural meaning. It may at this point actually cease to be what it had been previously identified as, at least in terms of its cultural or spiritual meaning.

Admittedly, more work and research needs to be done in regard to preservation of meaning in the area of library science. However, it is necessary for libraries and archival institutions to assess their preservation priorities in consideration of social and cultural meaning in tandem with physical attributes and informational context. Preservation and curatorial policies and activities can take into account how materials are housed, handled, repaired, or analyzed not just in terms of preserving physical qualities, but spiritual and cultural meaning as well.

== See also ==
- Meaning-making
- Values (heritage)
