= Stakeholder engagement =

Extent to which organizations encourage affected supporters to share in decision-making

Stakeholder engagement is the process by which an organization involves people who may be affected by the decisions it makes or can influence the implementation of its decisions. They may support or oppose the decisions, be influential in the organization or within the community in which it operates, hold relevant official positions or be affected in the long term.

== Corporate social responsibility (CSR) ==
Stakeholder engagement is a key part of corporate social responsibility (CSR) and achieving the triple bottom line. Companies engage their stakeholders in dialogue to find out what social and environmental issues matter most to them and involve stakeholders in the decision-making process.

Stakeholder engagement is used by mature organizations in the private and public, especially when they want to develop understanding and agreement around solutions on complex issues and large projects.

An underlying principle of stakeholder engagement is that stakeholders have the chance to influence the decision-making process. A key part of this is multistakeholder governance. This differentiates stakeholder engagement from communications processes that seek to issue a message or influence groups to agree with a decision that is already made.

Jeffery (2009) in "Stakeholder Engagement: A Roadmap to meaningful engagement" describes seven core values for the practices of gaining meaningful participation of which perhaps the three most critical are:

- Stakeholders should have a say in decisions about actions that could affect their lives or essential environment for life.
- Stakeholder participation includes the promise that stakeholder's contribution will influence the decision.
- Stakeholder participation seeks input from participants in designing how they participate.

The practitioners in stakeholder engagement are often businesses, non-governmental organizations (NGOs), labor organizations, trade and industry organizations, governments, and financial institutions.

== Frameworks and relevant organizations ==
Engaging stakeholder is a requirement of the Global Reporting Initiative (GRI). The GRI is a network-based organization with a sustainability reporting framework that is widely used around the world.

The International Organization for Standardization (ISO) has put forward a framework for sustainability (ISO 26000 - Guidance on social responsibility) that also requires stakeholder engagement.

The Environment Council, a European organization, developed the Principles of Authentic Engagement. These principles are intended to provide a framework for genuine stakeholder engagement.

The practitioners in stakeholder engagement are often businesses, non-governmental organizations (NGOs), labor organizations, trade and industry organizations, governments, and financial institutions. In a regional planning example in England, a line graph analysis of the relationship between these stakeholders over two decades has been provided.

== Components ==
Partnerships, in the context of corporate social responsibility interactions, are people and organizations from some combination of public, business and civil constituencies who engage in common societal aims through combining their resources and competencies, sharing both risks and benefits.

Agreeing on the rules of engagement is integral to the process. It is important for everyone to understand each party's role.

Buy-in is essential for success in stakeholder engagement. Every party must have a stake in the process and have participating members have decision-making power. Every party must be committed to the process by ensuring action based on the decisions made through the engagement.

No decisions should be already made before commencing stakeholder engagement on the issue. It is integral that the dialogue has legitimacy in influencing the decision.

== Benefits ==
Stakeholder engagement provides opportunities to further align business practices or knowledge production with societal needs and expectations, helping to drive long-term sustainability and shareholder value.

Stakeholder engagement is intended to help the practitioners and their organization, to compete in an increasingly complex and ever-changing business environment, while at the same time bringing about systemic change towards sustainable development.

The concept of stakeholder engagement in accounting is very important and strongly correlated with the concept of materiality. The main guidelines on the preparation of non-financial statements (GRI Standards and IIRC <IR> Framework) underline the centrality of stakeholder involvement in this process (materiality analysis).

== Consequences of Ignoring Stakeholder Feedback ==
The importance of stakeholder feedback cannot be overstated. Here are some key points to consider:

- Budget overruns: Costly mistakes from disregarding feedback can lead to financial strain.
- Missed deadlines: Lack of foresight from ignoring feedback can cause project delays.
- Reduced quality: Ignoring feedback can result in subpar deliverables and tarnish reputation.
- Loss of trust and support: Disregarding feedback can lead to a breakdown in communication and loss of stakeholder support.
- Project failure: Ignoring feedback can lead to project failure, negatively impacting the organization’s reputation and future prospects.

== See also ==
- Stakeholder engagement software
