= Ione Gedye =

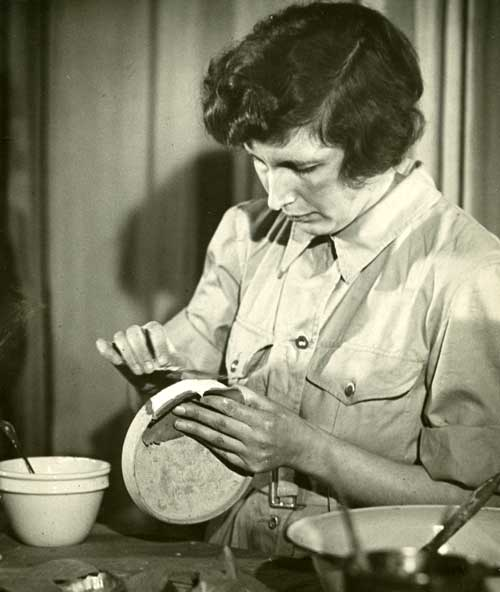
- Born: 1907
- Died: 12 November 1990 (aged 82–83)
- Education: University College London
- Occupation: Conservator
- Years active: 1937–1975
- Employer: University College London
- Organization: Institute of Archaeology
- Known for: Founding the conservation department at the Institute of Archaeology

Ione Gladys Gedye (1907 – 12 November 1990) was a pioneer conservator who founded the Repair Department at the Institute of Archaeology. She worked for over several decades in conservation at the Institute and was also a significant influence in the early years of archaeologically-themed television programmes.

== Early life and education ==
Ione Gedye was the only daughter (she had one brother) of civil engineer Lieutenant Colonel Nicholas George Gedye (1874–1947), of the Royal Engineers, OBE, who had been a senior figure in engineering at the Ministry of Agriculture and Fisheries, the Admiralty, and the Ministry of Transport, and his wife Vera, daughter of John Thompson, of Radclive.

She attended Francis Holland School, Graham Terrace between 1918 and 1925. Gedye was a student of Flinders Petrie in classical archaeology at University College, London. She volunteered to clean items from one of Petrie's excavations for a summer exhibition. Whilst studying at University College London, Gedye also rowed for her university.

Gedye worked at the Verulamium excavations with Tessa Verney Wheeler and Kathleen Kenyon. Wheeler had her clean metalwork from the excavations and encouraged her interest in artefacts.

== Career ==
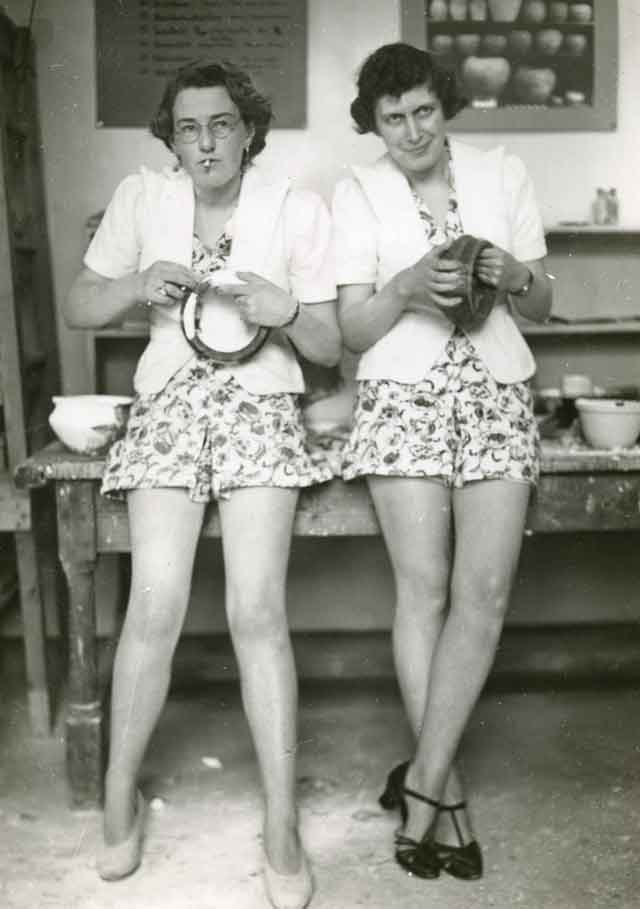
Gedye (right) and Delia Parker working in the Technical Department at St John's Lodge

Gedye was one of the original staff members in the technical department at the Institute of Archaeology, which opened in 1937. She was the founder of the Repair Department, which was initially housed in a former operating theatre.

There was no formal training programme in conservation in the 1930s, and Gedye conducted experiments to inform her work. She also learned about restoring and cleaning artefacts from people such as Harold Plenderleith at the British Museum Research Laboratory and from staff at the Royal Museums of Art and History in Brussels.

During the war, she worked on reconstructions of Pleistocene mammals.

Gedye taught conservation from 1937 to 1975. After World War II, she headed a conservation course that became increasingly attractive to students, and gradually expanded from a one-year certificate to become a three-year degree course. In the late 1950s, Gedye was joined in her work by Henry W. M. Hodges who helped her to develop the training course. Early broadcasts of archaeological digs by the BBC were informed by Gedye's work. This work educated the public and contributed to the professionalisation of archaeology in the UK.

Gedye retired in July 1975.

== Death and legacy ==
Gedye died in 1990.

The UCL Institute of Archaeology awards an Ione Gedye Award each year for the best conservation-based dissertation. This prize was created when Gedye requested that her colleagues create a prize for students rather than buy her a retirement gift. Gedye's portrait hangs in the institute.
