= Conservation of South Asian household shrines =

Conservation of shrines in South Asia

The conservation of South Asian household shrines is an activity dedicated to the preservation of household shrines from South Asia. When applied to cultural heritage, held by either museums or private collectors, this activity is generally undertaken by a conservator-restorer. South Asian shrines held in museum collections around the world are principally shrines related to Hindu, Jain, Shia or Buddhist households. Due to their original use and sacred nature, these shrines present unique conservation and restoration challenges for those tasked with their care.

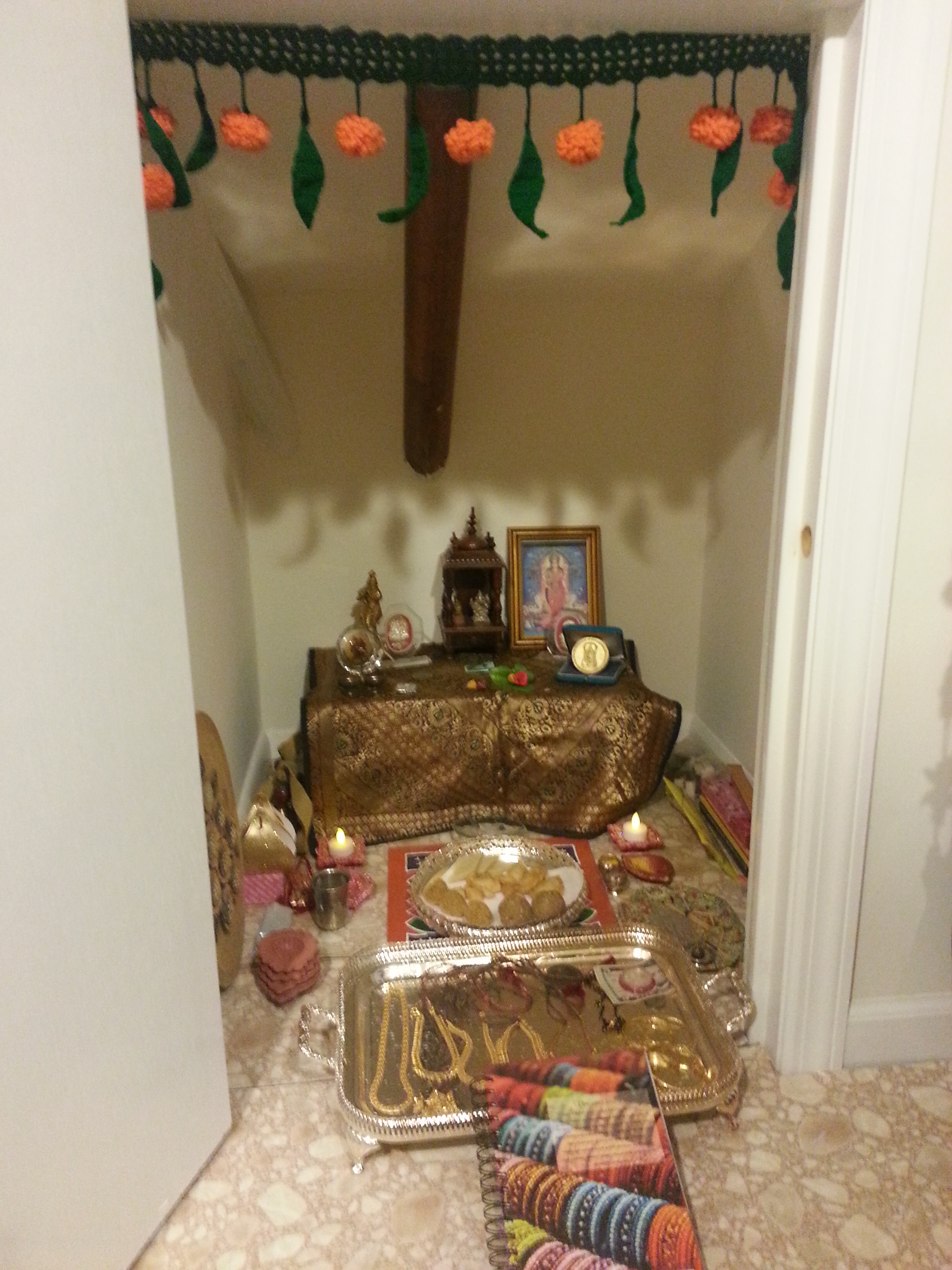
Hindu household shrine

== Household shrines ==
=== Usage ===
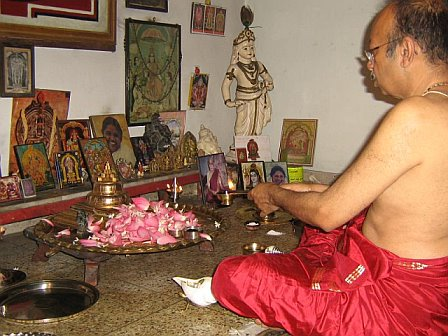
A modern Srividya adept performs Tantric puja at his home shrine, Kerala, India, 2006

In all three of these religions, daily ritual devotion is a central aspect. Shrines facilitate this practice by offering a sacred space within the home, serving as a focal point for meditation and offerings to the gods and enlightened ones. Daily rituals at household shrines can take many forms, but often feature some of the following practices: meditation and/or prayer, ritual bathing of sculptures in water, anointing with oils, lighting of candles or burning of incense, and offering of flowers and/or food. Devotional practices vary not only from religion to religion, but also from person to person. The above list contains common actions, but the form of daily ritual is set by the individual.

=== Appearance and materials ===
Shrines for household use vary in size, from simple tabletop setups with room for a sculpture and a few offerings to full shrines taking up entire walls. Devotional items and smaller shrines are typically purchased ready-made, though wealthier households often commissioned elaborate custom shrines. Though primarily made of wood and paint, household shrines sometimes feature extra adornment such as gold leaf or leather fittings. In far Eastern countries, like China and Japan, such shrines are often lacquered.

== Damage and deterioration ==
Household shrines can suffer damage from two overall sources: the materials used are at risk of deterioration particular to their nature, and the ways the shrines are used can cause specific types of wear and tear.

=== Humidity ===
As discussed, the majority of household shrines are made of painted wood, and both wood and paint are susceptible to the effects of humidity. Changes in the relative humidity of the wood’s environment can cause it to swell (in increased humidity) or shrink (in decreased humidity). Extreme or prolonged swelling can result in warping, while excess shrinkage can lead to cracks, particularly around nail or screw holes. In addition to damaging the wood, fluctuations in humidity can also deteriorate paint and other surface decoration: changes in humidity can result in loosening, flaking, and cracking paint. Gold leaf can dissolve in water, especially if applied with a water-soluble adhesive. Lacquer, a layer of shellac creating a clear, hardened surface, can delaminate from the underlying paint and wood layers if changes in humidity cause the wood to flex too much.

=== Pests ===
Pests can be attracted to the wood itself, or, in the case of shrines, to the offerings that are left on it. Insects feed on wood or burrow into it to build nests, weakening the structure and causing unsightly holes. The types of insects vary by region, but can include species of ants, bees, or termites. Fungi also feed on wood, albeit on a smaller scale, and depending on the type can cause everything from discoloration to disintegration.

A family shrine is in less danger of rats than the presence of food would lead one to believe, as the offerings are replaced on a daily basis. However, rats are attracted to food, and will gnaw through wood to get it, leaving holes.

=== Light ===
Direct sunlight or artificial light, both present in a home environment, can bleach wood and paint colors and, over a long period of time, weaken or deteriorate the wood’s cellular structure.

=== Pollutants ===
Humans are a source of pollutants that can damage a family shrine. Touching the surface can leave behind oils, salts, and acids present in skin, which over time can build up on the shrine and cause staining and surface erosion. Dirt and dust, if not frequently removed, can scratch and erode the wood. Ancient shrines have been found buried and accumulated significant damage from being encased in the soil. The most common pollutant for home shrines, particular in Buddhist households, is smoke: burning incense or candles is a standard component of daily prayer, and the smoke blackens the shrine over time. Superficial burns to the wood, though unlikely, are also possible.

== Preventive conservation ==
Protecting household shrines from further deterioration requires considering each of the agents of decay in terms of the activities of storage, handling, and display.

=== Storage ===
The ideal relative humidity for wooden objects is 50%; museums aim to keep the environment’s relative humidity within a few percentage points of this target; typically with no more than 10% fluctuation within a 24-hour period. A stable temperature is also considered preferable, as any fluctuations directly affects relative humidity. Conservators use an Integrated Pest Management policy to reduce the threats of pests and vermin to collections, pest eradication processes are carefully selected to take into account the sacred nature of the shrines. For some religious groups, certain pest control methods such as freezing and anoxia are considered just as deadly to the sacred nature of the object as to pests; therefore, they should not be undertaken if the appropriate religious community forbids them. Lights should only be used when needed, and should be kept as dim as possible. Frequent careful cleanings, combined with dust covers, will reduce the danger of pollutants. Cleaning should be done with a soft cotton cloth or cosmetic brush, and a mild detergent and water if necessary.

=== Handling ===
Best practice in museum handling of collection objects, such as shrines, dictates that objects be moved as little as possible. Shrines are frequently large, with intricate carvings, and there is significant risk of breakage through moving them. When handling or moving is necessary, it is done with careful planning—gloves, typically nitrile or cotton, are worn to prevent transferring pollutants on the hands to the shrine.

=== Display ===
Lighting presents an additional challenge, since the object must be visible to viewers. Lights are kept as low as possible while still being bright enough to allow visitors to navigate the room and see the shrine. Sometimes lights will only be turned on when the shrine display is open to the public. UV filters are typically installed on artificial lights and window glass to prevent UV light from sun causing damage.

== Treatment ==
=== Research ===
Due to the religious nature of household shrines, in addition to determining the extent of the damage, conservation professionals advocate researching the spiritual nature of the shrine before restoration work begins. A recommended starting point is to ask why something is being conserved. There are multiple approaches to conservation and restoration, and this initial question is a preferred guideline for deciding which approach to take. There are two possible approaches to restoration of household religious objects: materials-based and values-based. Materials-based restoration refers simply to fixing what is broken: the materials are damaged, so they will be fixed. Values-based restoration is concerned with preserving the "intangible" qualities of an object—in this case, its religious properties. This approach involves not removing evidence of use on the object as long as it is not contributing to its deterioration. Values-based is the approach most often argued for, but it is noted that a combination of the two types is frequently the most appropriate.

=== Wood restoration ===
Wood restoration can be an invasive process: to repair warping, for example, shallow cuts are often made in the surface of the wood to allow it to be pulled back into its original position and secured in place. Cracks can be filled with adhesive to both disguise them and prevent them from expanding, while holes or missing pieces are typically patched with replica parts. Wood that has been bleached may be re-stained or inpainted to match the undamaged areas.

=== Paint restoration ===
Loosened or flaking paint can be consolidated by injecting it with adhesive. Scratches can be inpainted, or repainted to reduce their appearance. Painted surfaces may be carefully cleaned with solvents to ensure that only the grime is removed and not the paint layer underneath. Lacquer that has delaminated from the paint layer may be glued back into place.

== Ethics ==
=== Conflicting ideals ===
Conservation and museum display of religious objects, like household shrines, represents two ideologies in conflict. Museums are secular spaces, and restoration is secular work, but family shrines are sacred. The education and aesthetic-focused missions of museums and conservators are inherently at odds with the religious, family, and social functions of household altars. Restoring a shrine for museum display and putting it on exhibit affects its function: it becomes art to those outside its subject religion, but to adherents it can retain its status as an object of veneration even after being removed from its original context.

In addition to these differing principles that affect how a shrine is perceived, religious communities may have restrictions on what actions are appropriate for storage, restoration, and exhibition. For example, Buddhist writings and inscriptions show evidence of ongoing upkeep on ancient shrines and temples, indicating a prescription within the faith to maintain holy objects. Similarly, Jainic texts indicate that building a new shrine gives karmic reward, but a larger karmic reward is given for restoring an old shrine. Hinduism, by contrast, commands that shrines and statues be worthy receptacles for the gods: if they become damaged, some Hindu groups believe, they should be ritually destroyed and replaced. Buddhism, Jainism, and Hinduism not only vary from each other in their approaches to restoration, but groups and individuals within the religions may differ as well. As such, ethical standards state that the conservation methods undertaken for one object should not be applied to another, however similar, without consultation with the source religious community.

=== Consultation and care ===
==== Traditional care ====
Multiple conservation organizations, including the Western Association for Art Conservation (WAAC) and the International Centre for the Conservation and Restoration of Monuments (ICCROM), state that a goal of conservation is to preserve the intangible qualities of an object as well as the tangible, physical qualities. To fully understand these intangible qualities, consultation with members of the religious community is necessary.

In addition to the preventive conservation methods described earlier, consultation with religious communities may disclose traditional or ritual care practices that the subject religion requires for sacred objects. These measure could include directives on how objects can be stored, who can handle them, and what—if any—restorative measures can be taken. Ritual care has the potential to prescribe religious practices to museum staff members who are not adherents of the subject religion; to avoid this, a recommended practice is active practice and passive accommodation: active practice refers to actions and behaviors with the object that can only be undertaken by a knowledgeable practitioner, while passive accommodation refers to the museum staff allowing the practitioner to conduct the practice within the museum space. Conservators and other museum professionals should be prepared to conduct restoration best practices within the confines of what the religious representatives allow.

==== Varying approaches ====
Museum and conservation professionals take several different stances on how best to approach the care of religious objects. The Victoria and Albert Museum in the United Kingdom, for example, provides all of its staff conservators with an Ethics Checklist that, among other measures, prescribes consultation with a number of interested parties before conservation begins, and asks conservators to consider how their actions will affect the "identity and significance of the object(s)". Similarly, the Government of Canada promotes an imperative of "respectful care", wherein conservators fit their best practices into standards of care required by cultural representatives. ICCROM takes an even more culturally-centered approach, stating that the entire conservation process, including the decision to conserve, should originate with and be directed by the source religious community. Others suggest that consultation can go both ways, with religious representatives educating conservationists on proper care of the shrines, while conservationists can education the faithful on what their work entails to ensure that no boundaries are overstepped. From an exhibition standpoint, some recommend advocating for the religious aspects of these objects by creating more immersive museum displays that promote and explain the devotional qualities of the shrines instead of reducing them to aesthetics. The WAAC, for its part, advocates presenting the source community with all possible options regarding care and treatment of the object in question and letting the final decision rest with the community. As this illustrates, although the bulk of museum and conservation organizations recommend consultation with religious representatives, as yet there is no complete consensus on the best ways to ethically care for and restore religious objects.

== Case studies ==
=== Nelson-Atkins Museum of Art ===
The Nelson-Atkins Museum of Art spent more than a year restoring a Jain household shrine that had been in storage for over 70 years. Analysis of the shrine revealed two paint layers underneath the surface dirt: the original layer from the 16th century, and a later coating from the 1800s. The decision was made by the conservators to remove only the surface grime and not attempt to remove the later paint layer: Jainism gives greater spiritual reward for restoring an old shrine than building a new one, so the conservators opted not to undo the spiritual work of the individual(s) who did the 1800s repainting. The shrine has been on display in the Nelson-Atkins Asian Art gallery since 2014.

=== Philadelphia Museum of Art ===
The Philadelphia Museum of Art acquired a one-hundred-year-old Tibetan home altar in 2004. At the time of acquisition, soot and oil from incense and lamp burning had built up on the surface. Consulting with Tibetan Buddhist sources revealed that such surface grime, though a direct result of ritual, is not in and of itself religiously significant and thus was safe to remove. The altar is on display in the museum’s Asian Art gallery.

=== Newark Museum ===
The Newark Museum is also in possession of a Tibetan Buddhist altar; however, this one was built for the museum after the ritual destruction of a shrine dating from 1935. That shrine had also been built as a display piece for the museum and was never consecrated, but the presence of Tibetan ritual objects surrounding it had, in the opinion of religious representatives, sanctified the altar nonetheless. When the decision was made to replace it, a deconsecration ceremony was held by a Buddhist official, and the shrine was dismantled. The new shrine was designed and built by a Tibetan artist.
