= Project stakeholder =

Persons or entities with an interest in a project

Initiating Process Group Stakeholders

Project stakeholders are persons or entities who have an interest in a specific project. According to the Project Management Institute (PMI), the term project stakeholder refers to "an individual, group, or organization, who may affect, be affected by, or perceive itself to be affected by a decision, activity, or outcome of a project, program, or portfolio. ISO 21500 uses a similar definition.

== Types of stakeholders ==
Stakeholders may be located inside or outside an organization, including:

1. The project's sponsor;
2. Those with an interest or the potential to gain from the successful completion of a project;
3. Anyone who may have a positive or negative influence in the project completion.

The following are examples of project stakeholders:

- Project leader
- Senior management
- Project team members
- Project customer
- Community Served or the Community that is being Served (example of a stakeholder affected by a non-profit organization or government agency)
- Resource managers
- Line managers
- Product user group
- Project testers
- Any group impacted by the project as it progresses
- Any group impacted by the project when it is completed
- Subcontractors to the project
- Consultants to the project

== Stakeholder management ==
By the beginning of the 21st century, stakeholders have been considered more and more as the crucial human factor that defines the perception of success of a project, particularly the beneficiaries of the project's outcomes. This has increased the focus on stakeholder management within the general topic of project management.

Rather than focusing on one subset of stakeholders, Lynda Bourne advocates prioritizing all stakeholders and focusing your attention on the "most important" at this point in time. Her view of importance encompasses an assessment of the power, proximity and urgency associated with each stakeholder. She calls her methodology a "Stakeholder Circle".

The rationale for this emphasis on decision makers is part of project stakeholder management and a key component in affecting change in an organization. John Hotter describes stakeholder analysis and stakeholder management as essential components of change management.

== See also ==
- Stakeholder register
