= Stakeholder analysis =

Process of identifying those affected by a project or event

Stakeholder analysis —used in conflict resolution, business administration, environmental health sciences decision making, industrial ecology, public administration, and project management— is a process of assessing a system and its potential changes in relation to interest and influence of relevant parties, known as stakeholders. This information is used to assess how the interests of those stakeholders should be addressed in a project plan, policy, program, or other action. Stakeholder analysis is a key part of stakeholder management. A stakeholder analysis of an issue consists of weighing and balancing all of the competing demands on a firm by each of those who have a claim on it, in order to arrive at the firm's obligation in a particular case. A stakeholder analysis does not preclude the interests of the stakeholders overriding the interests of the other stakeholders affected, but it ensures that all affected will be considered.

Stakeholder analysis is frequently used during the preparation phase of a project to assess the attitudes of the stakeholders regarding the potential changes. Stakeholder analysis can be done once or on a regular basis to track changes in stakeholder attitudes over time.

== Stakeholder types ==
Types of stakeholders include:

- Primary stakeholders: those ultimately most affected, either positively or negatively by an organization's actions
- Secondary stakeholders: the "intermediaries," that is, persons or organizations who are indirectly affected by an organization's actions
- Tertiary stakeholders: those who will be impacted the least

Other types of stakeholders:

- Key stakeholders: those with significant influence upon or importance within an organization; can also belong to the other groups

== Stakeholder mapping ==
The following list identifies some of the best known and most commonly used methods for stakeholder mapping:

- Cameron et al. defined a process for ranking stakeholders based on needs and the relative importance of stakeholders to others in the network.
- Mitchell et al. proposed a classification of stakeholders based on power to influence, the legitimacy of each stakeholder's relationship with the organization, and the urgency of the stakeholder's claim on the organization. The results of this classification may assess the fundamental question of "which groups are stakeholders deserving or requiring manager's attention, and which are not?" This is salience – "the degree to which managers give priority to competing stakeholder claims."
- Savage et al. offer a way to classify stakeholders according to potential for threat and potential for cooperation.
- Turner et al. have developed a process of identification, assessment of awareness, support, and influence, leading to strategies for communicating and assessing stakeholder satisfaction, and determining who is aware or ignorant and whether their attitude is supportive or opposing.

Mapping techniques include the following analysis techniques being used by aid agencies, governments, or consultant groups:

- Imperial College London's influence-interest grid, "plotting stakeholders on a graph in terms of their influence over the project and their interest in the project"
- The former Office of Government Commerce's power-impact grid, mapping "the level of impact of the change on [stakeholder] and the importance these stakeholders [have] to the success of the change project".

=== Stakeholder mapping procedure ===
The list of potential stakeholders for any project often exceeds both the time available for analysis and the capability to sensibly map and display the results. The challenge is to focus on the right stakeholders who are currently important and to create a visual representation of this critical sub-set of the total community - the key stakeholders.

1. Develop a categorised list of the members of the stakeholder community.
2. Stakeholders can be prioritized in some order.
3. The highest priority stakeholders are then translated into a visual representation (often a table or a graph).

=== The power-interest matrix ===
A Power-Interest matrix (Mendelow's matrix) showing strategies to use based on the quadrant the stakeholders are categorised in

The most common presentation style uses a two-dimensional matrix. Power and influence are commonly seen with a third dimension shown by the colour or size of the symbol representing the individual stakeholders, often the attitude.

Some of the commonly used dimensions include:

- Power (high, medium, low)
- Influence (high or low)
- Interest/Need (high, medium, low)
- Support/Attitude (positive, neutral, negative)

=== The salience model ===
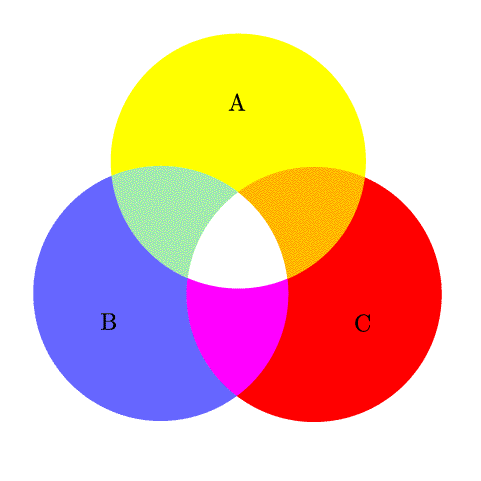
The salience model has eight regions each associated with a stakeholder type.

The salience model uses three dimensions: legitimacy (A), power (B), and urgency (C). It is represented in a Venn diagram with eight regions, each associated with a specific stakeholder type.

Stakeholder types as described by the salience model:

1. Discretionary stakeholders: These stakeholders have little urgency or power and are unlikely to exert much pressure. They have legitimate claims. (yellow region)
2. Dormant stakeholders: These stakeholders have much power but no legitimacy or urgency and therefore are not likely to become heavily involved. (blue region)
3. Demanding stakeholders: These stakeholders have little power or legitimacy but can make much "noise" because they want things to be addressed immediately. (red region)
4. Dominant stakeholders: These stakeholders have both formal power and legitimacy, but little urgency. They tend to have certain expectations that must be met. (green region)
5. Dangerous stakeholders: These stakeholders have power and urgency but are not really pertinent to the project. (purple region)
6. Dependent stakeholders: These stakeholders have urgent and legitimate stakes in the project but little power. These stakeholders may lean on another stakeholder group to have their voices heard. (orange region)
7. Definitive stakeholders: These stakeholders have power, legitimacy and urgency and therefore have the highest salience. (white region at the intersection of all other regions)
8. Non-stakeholders: These stakeholders have no power, legitimacy or urgency. (outside the regions defined by the circles A, B, and C)

== Benefits ==
Stakeholder analysis helps with the identification of:

- Stakeholders' interests
- Potential risks and misunderstandings
- Mechanisms to positively influence other stakeholders
- Key people to be informed about the project during the execution phase
- Negative stakeholders as well as their adverse effects on the project

== See also ==
- Actor analysis
- Crowdsourcing
- Department of Defense Architecture Framework
- Participation (decision making)
- Public consultation
- Responsibility assignment matrix
- Stakeholder engagement software
- Stakeholder theory
