= Responsibility assignment matrix =

Tool used for project and business process management

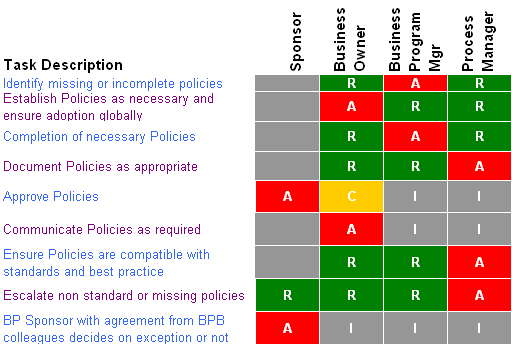
Example of a responsibility assignment matrix.

A responsibility assignment matrix, RACI matrix (responsible, accountable, consulted and informed matrix; /ˈreɪsi/) or linear responsibility chart, is a project management technique that describes the responsibilities of various stakeholders in completing tasks or deliverables. The matrix assigns one of four responsibilities to each stakeholder in executing a deliverable: Responsible, Accountable, Consulted, and Informed.

Under the RACI framework:

- Responsible stakeholders are involved in the planning, execution, and completion of the task;
- Accountable stakeholders are held to be individually and ultimately responsible for the success or failure of the task;
- Consulted stakeholders are sought for their opinions on a task;
- Informed stakeholders are updated as the project progresses.

== RACI model ==
RACI is a model that describes the participation of various roles in completing tasks or deliverables for a project or business process. The four key responsibilities most typically used are: responsible, accountable, consulted, and informed. It is often used to define roles and responsibilities in cross-departmental projects.

R: Responsible — Those who complete the task. There is at least one role with a participation type of responsible, although others can be delegated to assist in the work required.

A: Accountable (also approver or approving authority) — The one ultimately answerable for the correct completion of the deliverable or task, ensuring the prerequisites of the task are met, and delegating the work to those responsible. Accountable stakeholders sign off and approve work that responsible stakeholders provide. According to some theories of project management, there must be only one accountable stakeholder specified for each task or deliverable.

C: Consulted — Those whose opinions are sought, such as subject-matter experts, and with whom there is two-way communication.

I: Informed — Those who are kept up-to-date on progress, often only on completion of the task or deliverable, and with whom there is just one-way communication.

The RACI model is also known as a responsibility assignment matrix and linear responsibility chart.

=== Alternatives ===
There are a number of alternatives to the RACI model, including:

- DACI: Driver, Approvers, Contributors, Informed
- PARIS: Participant, Accountable, Review required, Input required, Sign-off required
- RACI + F: includes Facilitation in Scrum projects
- RACIS/RASCI/RASIC/RASI: includes Support
- RACIO/CAIRO: includes Omitted (or Out-of-the-loop)
- RACIQ: includes Quality review
- RACI-VSL includes Verifier and Signatory

== Charting ==
Responsibility assignment matrices are charted with the vertical axis representing tasks or deliverables and the horizontal axis representing roles.

Example RACI chart
Tasks	Maintenance supervisors	Maintenance analyst	Maintenance planner	Maintenance technician	Maintenance support	Rel specialist	CMMS project engineer
Inputting failure data	A	C	I	R		C	C
Work order completion	R	C	C	C	A	I	I
Work order closeout	C	R	C		I	I	A
QA of failure data input	C	R	I	C	I	C	A
Analyze failure reports	C	C	I	C	A	R	I
Maintenance strategy adjustments	C	I	I	C	A	R	R
Implementing new strategies	R	I	R	C	A	I	I

== See also ==
- Diffusion of responsibility
- Stakeholder analysis
