= Comparison of project management software =

The following is a comparison of project management software.

== General information ==
Software	Web-based	Hosted on-premises	SaaS	License	Programming language
24SevenOffice	Yes	No	Yes	Proprietary	
AnyChart (AnyGantt)	Yes	Yes	Yes	Proprietary	JavaScript
Apache Allura	Yes	Yes		Apache License	Python
Apache OFBiz	Yes	Yes	Yes	Apache License	Java, XML, FreeMarker, Groovy, JavaScript
Apache Bloodhound	Yes	Yes	Yes	Apache License	Python
Asana	Yes	No	Yes	Proprietary	
Assembla	Yes	Yes	Yes	Proprietary	
Axosoft	Yes	Yes	Yes	Proprietary	
Basecamp	Yes	No	Yes	Proprietary	Ruby
BigGantt	Yes	Yes	Yes	Proprietary	Java, Angular
BigPicture	Yes	Yes	Yes	Proprietary	Java, Angular
Calligra Plan	No	File-based	No	GPL	C++ and Java
CEITON	Yes	Yes	Yes	Proprietary	ASP.NET, JavaScript
Clarizen	Yes	No	Yes	Proprietary	
ConceptDraw Project	No	Yes	No	Proprietary	
ConceptDraw PLAN	Yes	No	Yes	Proprietary	PHP and Java
Copper Project	Yes	Yes	Yes	Proprietary	
dotProject	Yes	Yes	Yes	GPL	PHP
DynaRoad	No	Unknown	Unknown	Proprietary	
Easy Redmine	Yes	Yes	Yes	Open Source	Ruby on Rails and Vue.js
Easy projects	Yes	Yes	Yes	Proprietary	ASP.NET
Endeavour Software Project Management	Yes	Yes	Unknown	GPL	Java
eGroupWare	Yes	Yes	Unknown	GPL	PHP
enQuire	Yes	Unknown	Yes	Proprietary	Java
FastTrack Schedule	No	Yes	No	Proprietary	
Feng Office Community Edition	Yes	Yes	Yes	AGPLv3	PHP
FinancialForce.com	Yes	Unknown	Yes	Proprietary	
FogBugz	Yes	Yes	Yes	Proprietary	ASP.NET
Fossil-scm	Yes	Yes	Yes	2-clause BSD license	SQLite and C
Freedcamp	Yes	No	Yes	Proprietary	
FusionForge	Yes	Yes	Unknown	GPL	PHP
Genius Project	Yes	Yes	Yes	Proprietary	
Goalscape	Yes	Yes	Yes	Proprietary	
GroupOffice	Yes	Yes	Yes	Proprietary	
Hall.com	Yes	Unknown	Yes	Unknown	
Helix ALM	Yes	Yes	Yes	Proprietary	C++
HP Project & Portfolio Software	Yes	Yes	Unknown	Proprietary	
Huddle	Yes	Unknown	Unknown	Proprietary	
HyperOffice	Yes	Unknown	Unknown	Proprietary	
Intaver Institute;RiskyProject	Yes	Yes	Yes	Proprietary	
IRise	Yes	Yes	Yes	Proprietary	Java
Jira	Yes	Yes	Yes	Proprietary	Java
Launchpad	Yes	No	Yes	AGPL	Python
LibrePlan	Yes	Yes	Yes	AGPL	Java
LiquidPlanner	Yes	No	Yes	Proprietary	Ruby
MacProject	No	Unknown	Unknown	Proprietary	
MantisBT	Yes	Yes	No	GPL	PHP
Meridian Systems;Proliance	Yes	Yes	Yes	Proprietary	
Microsoft Dynamics AX	No	Yes	No	Proprietary	X++
Microsoft Office Project Server	Yes	Yes	Yes	Proprietary	
Microsoft Project	Yes	Yes	Yes	Proprietary	
Microsoft SharePoint Server	Yes	Yes	Yes	Proprietary	
Microsoft Team Foundation Server	Yes	Yes	Yes	Proprietary	
Milestones Professional	No	Yes	No	Proprietary	C++
Mingle	Yes	Yes	Yes	Proprietary	Ruby on Rails
Monday.com	Yes	Yes	Yes	Proprietary	
MyWorkPLAN	No	Unknown	Unknown	Proprietary	
NetPoint	No	Unknown	Unknown	Proprietary	
NetSuite	Yes	No	Yes	Proprietary	
O3Spaces	No	Unknown	Unknown	Proprietary	
OmniPlan	No	Yes	No	Proprietary	
Onepager pro	No	Yes	No	Proprietary	ASP.NET
Open Workbench	No	Unknown	Unknown	Open source	
OpenProj	No	Unknown	Yes	CPAL	Java
OpenProject	Yes	Yes	Yes	GPL	Ruby on Rails and Angular
OnlyOffice	Yes	Yes	Yes	GPL	ASP.NET
Oracle Primavera EPPM (Primavera P6)	Yes	Yes	Yes	Proprietary	
phpGroupWare	Yes	Unknown	Unknown	GPL	PHP
PHProjekt	Yes	Unknown	Unknown	LGPL	PHP
Pivotal Tracker	Yes	No	Yes	Unknown	Ruby
Planisware	Yes	Yes	Yes	Proprietary	
PLANTA Project	Yes	Yes	No	Proprietary	
Priority Matrix	Yes	No	Yes	Proprietary	
Project KickStart	No	Yes	Unknown	Proprietary	
Project Team Builder	Yes	Yes	Yes	Proprietary	
Projector PSA	Yes	Yes	Yes	Proprietary	
ProjectLibre	No (Cloud based version under development)	Yes	No (Included in future plans)	CPAL	Java
ProjectManager.com	Yes	No	Yes	Proprietary	
Project.net	Yes	Yes	Yes	GPL	Java
Projectplace	Yes	No	Yes	Proprietary	
ProjeQtOr	Yes	Yes	Yes	AGPL	PHP
Prolog	Yes	Yes	Yes	Proprietary	
Pyrus	Yes	Yes	Yes	Proprietary	
RationalPlan	Yes	Yes	Yes	Proprietary	
Redmine	Yes	Yes	Yes	GPL	Ruby
SAP Business ByDesign	Yes	Unknown	Yes	Proprietary	
Sciforma	Yes	Yes	Yes	Proprietary	
Scoro	Yes	No	Yes	Proprietary	PHP
Seavus Project Viewer (software)	Yes	Yes	Yes	Proprietary	C++
Severa	Yes	Unknown	Yes	Unknown	
Shortcut Software	Yes		Yes	Proprietary	Clojure, JavaScript
Smartsheet	Yes	Unknown	Yes	Proprietary	PHP
Spider Project	No	No	No	Proprietary	
Streamtime Software	Yes	No	Yes	Proprietary	PHP
Taiga	Yes	Yes	Yes	AGPL	Python
TaskJuggler	No	Yes	No	GPL	Ruby
Teamcenter	Yes	Yes	Yes	Proprietary	
TeamDynamixHE	Yes	Yes	Yes	Proprietary	
Tom's Planner	Yes	Unknown	Unknown	Proprietary	
Trac	Yes	Yes	Yes	(modified) BSD license	Python
TrackerSuite.Net	Yes	Yes	Yes	Proprietary	
Traction TeamPage	Yes	Yes	Yes	Proprietary	Java
Trello	Yes	No	Yes	Proprietary	CoffeeScript, Backbone.js, HTML5, Mustache templating language, MongoDB, Node.js, Socket.io
Tuleap	Yes	Yes	Yes	GPL	
Twproject	Yes	Yes	Yes	Proprietary	
UniPhi	Yes	Yes	Yes	Proprietary	ASP.NET
Vpmi	Yes	Unknown	Unknown	Proprietary	
web2project	Yes	Unknown	Unknown	GPL	PHP
Windchill (software);ProjectLink	Yes	Yes	Yes	Proprietary	
Workamajig	Yes	Yes	Yes	Proprietary	
Workfront	Yes	No	Yes	Proprietary	
WorkPLAN Enterprise	No	Unknown	Unknown	Proprietary	
Workspace.com	Yes	Unknown	Yes	Proprietary	
Wrike	Yes	Unknown	Yes	Proprietary	
Zoho Projects	Yes	No	Yes	Proprietary	PHP

== Features ==
Software	Collaborative software	Issue tracking system	Scheduling	Project portfolio management	Resource management	Document management	Workflow system	Reporting and analyses
24SevenOffice	Yes	Yes	Yes	Yes	Yes	Yes	Yes	Yes
AnyChart (AnyGantt)	Yes	No	Yes	Yes	Yes	No	Yes	Yes
Apache Allura	Yes	Yes	No	Yes	Yes	Yes	No	No
Apache OFBiz	Unknown	No	Yes	Yes	Yes	Yes	No	Unknown
Apache Bloodhound	Yes	Yes	No	No	No	No	Yes	No
Asana	Yes	No	Yes	Yes	Yes	No	Yes	Yes
Assembla	Yes	Yes	Yes	Yes	Yes	Yes	Yes	Yes
Axosoft	Yes	Yes	Yes	Yes	Yes	Yes	Yes	Yes
Basecamp	Yes	No	No	No	Yes	Yes	No	No
BigGantt	Yes	Yes	Yes	Yes	Yes	No	Yes	Yes
BigPicture	Yes	Yes	Yes	Yes	Yes	No	Yes	Yes
Calligra Plan	No	No	Yes	No	Yes	No	No	No
CEITON	Yes	Yes	Yes	Yes	Yes	Yes	Yes	Yes
Clarizen	Yes	Yes	Yes	Yes	Yes	Yes	Yes	Yes
ConceptDraw Project	Yes	Yes	Yes	Yes	Yes	Yes	Yes	Yes
Copper Project	Yes	Yes	Yes	Yes	Yes	Yes	No	Yes
dotProject	Yes	Yes	No	Yes	Yes	Yes	No	Yes
DynaRoad	No	No	Yes	No	Yes	No	Yes	Yes
Easy Redmine	Yes	Yes	Yes	Yes	Yes	Yes	Yes	Yes
Easy projects	Yes	Yes	Yes	Yes	Yes	No	No	Yes
Endeavour Software Project Management	Yes	Yes	Yes	Yes	Yes	Yes	No	Yes
eGroupWare	Yes	Yes	No	Yes	Yes	Yes	No	No
enQuire	Yes	Yes	Yes	Yes	Yes	Yes	Yes	Yes
FastTrack Schedule	Yes	No	Yes	Yes	Yes	No	Yes	Yes
Feng Office Community Edition	Yes	No	Yes	Yes	No	Yes	No	No
FinancialForce.com	No	No	Yes	No	Yes	No	No	Yes
FogBugz	Yes	Yes	Yes	No	Yes	No	Yes	Yes
Fossil-scm	Yes	Yes	No	No	No	No	No	No
Freedcamp	Yes	Yes	Yes	No	No	Yes	Yes	Yes
Genius Project	Yes	Yes	Yes	Yes	Yes	Yes	Yes	Yes
Goalscape	Yes	Yes	Yes	Yes	Yes	No	Yes	Yes
Group-Office	Yes	No	Yes	No	No	Yes	No	No
Hall.com	Yes	No	No	No	Yes	Yes	No	No
Helix ALM	Yes	Yes	No	No	No	No	Yes	Yes
HP Project & Portfolio Software	Yes	Yes	Yes	Yes	Yes	Yes	Yes	Yes
Huddle	Yes	No	No	No	No	Yes	No	No
Hyperoffice	Yes	No	No	No	No	Yes	No	No
IRise	Yes	Yes	Yes	No	No	No	Yes	Yes
Jira	Yes	Yes	Yes	No	No	No	Yes	Yes
Launchpad	Yes	Yes	No	Yes	No	No	No	No
LibrePlan	Yes	No	Yes	No	Yes	No	No	Yes
LiquidPlanner	Yes	Yes	Yes	Yes	Yes	Yes	Yes	Yes
MacProject	No	No	Yes	No	Yes	No	No	No
MantisBT	No	Yes	No	No	No	No	No	No
Microsoft Dynamics AX	Yes	No	Yes	No	Yes	Yes	Yes	Yes
Microsoft Office Project Server	Yes	Yes	Yes	Yes	Yes	Yes	Yes	Yes
Microsoft Project	No	No	Yes	No	Yes	No	No	Yes
Microsoft SharePoint Server	Yes	Yes	Yes	No	No	Yes	Yes	No
Microsoft Team Foundation Server	Yes	Yes	Yes	No	No	Yes	Yes	Yes
Milestones Professional	No	Yes	Yes	No	No	Yes	No	No
MyWorkPLAN	Yes	Yes	Yes	Yes	Yes	Yes	Yes	Yes
NetPoint	No	No	Yes	No	Yes	No	No	No
NetSuite	Yes	Yes	Yes	Yes	Yes	No	Yes	Yes
O3Spaces	Yes	No	No	No	No	Yes	No	No
OnePager Pro	Yes	No	Yes	Yes	Yes	Yes	No	Yes
OmniPlan	Yes	No	Yes	No	Yes	No	No	Yes
Open Workbench	No	No	Yes	No	Yes	No	No	No
OpenProj	No	No	Yes	No	Yes	No	No	No
OpenProject	Yes	Yes	Yes	Yes	No	Yes	Yes	Yes (via OpenProject plug-ins)
Oracle Primavera EPPM (Primavera P6)	Yes	Yes	Yes	Yes	Yes	Yes	Yes	Yes
phpGroupWare	Yes	Yes	No	Unknown	Yes	Yes	No	No
PHProjekt	Yes	Yes	Yes	No	No	No	No	No
Pivotal Tracker	Yes	Yes	Yes	No	No	Yes	Yes	Yes
Planisware	Yes	Yes	Yes	Yes	Yes	Yes	Yes	Yes
PLANTA Project	Yes	Yes	Yes	Yes	Yes	Yes	Yes	Yes
Project KickStart	No	No	Yes	No	Yes	Yes	Yes	Yes
Project Team Builder	Yes	No	Yes	Yes	Yes	No	Yes	Yes
ProjectLibre	No (Enterprise ProjectLibre and PPMLibre under development)	No	Yes	No (Enterprise ProjectLibre and PPMLibre under development)	Yes	No	No	Yes
ProjectLink	Yes	Yes	Yes	Yes	Yes	Yes	Yes	Yes
ProjectManager.com	Yes	Yes	Yes	Yes	Yes	Yes	Yes	Yes
Project.net	Yes	Yes	Yes	Yes	Yes	Yes	Yes	Yes
Projector PSA	No	No	Yes	No	Yes	Yes	Yes	Yes
Projectplace	Yes	Yes	Yes	Yes	Yes	Yes	No	No
ProjeQtOr	Yes	Yes	Yes	Yes	Yes	Yes	Yes	Yes
Proliance	Yes	Yes	Yes	Yes	Yes	Yes	Yes	Yes
Prolog	Yes	Yes	No	Yes	No	Yes	Yes	Yes
Pyrus	Yes	Yes	No	Yes	Yes	Yes	Yes	Yes
RationalPlan	Yes	Yes	Yes	Yes	Yes	Yes	Yes	Yes
Redmine	Yes	Yes	Yes	Yes	No	Yes	Yes	No
SAP Business ByDesign	Yes	Yes	Yes	Yes	Yes	Yes	Yes	Yes
Sciforma	Yes	Yes	Yes	Yes	Yes	Yes	Yes	Yes
Scoro	Yes	Yes	Yes	Yes	Yes	Yes	Yes	Yes
Severa	Yes	Yes	Yes	Yes	Yes	Yes	Yes	Yes
Smartsheet	Yes	Yes	Yes	No	Yes	Yes	No	Yes
Spider Project	No	No	Yes	Yes	Yes	No	No	Yes
Streamtime Software	Yes	No	Yes	Yes	Yes	No	Yes	Yes
TaskJuggler	Yes	No	Yes	No	Yes	No	No	No
Teamcenter	Yes	Yes	Yes	Yes	Yes	Yes	Yes	Yes
TeamDynamixHE	Yes	Yes	Yes	Yes	Yes	Yes	Yes	Yes
TeamLab	Yes	No	Yes	Yes	No	Yes	No	Yes
Trac	Yes	Yes	No	No	No	No	Yes	No
TrackerSuite.Net	Yes	Yes	Yes	Yes	Yes	Yes	Yes	Yes
Traction TeamPage	Yes	Yes	Yes	Yes	No	Yes	No	Yes
Trello	Yes	Yes	Yes	Unknown	Unknown	No	No	Unknown
Tuleap	Yes	Yes	Yes	No	No	Yes	Yes	Yes
Twproject	Yes	Yes	Yes	Yes	Yes	Yes	Yes	Yes
UniPhi	Yes	Yes	No	Yes	Yes	Yes	Yes	Yes
VPMi	Unknown	Unknown	Unknown	Unknown	Unknown	Unknown	Unknown	Unknown
web2project	Yes	Yes	No	Yes	Yes	Yes	No	Yes
Workamajig	Yes	Yes	Yes	Yes	Yes	Yes	Yes	Yes
Workfront	Yes	Yes	Yes	Yes	Yes	Yes	Yes	Yes
WorkPLAN Enterprise	Yes	Yes	Yes	Yes	Yes	Yes	Yes	Yes
Workspace.com	Yes	Yes	Yes	Yes	Yes	Yes	Unknown	Unknown
Wrike	Yes	Yes	Yes	Yes	Yes	Yes	Yes	Yes
Zoho Projects	Yes	Yes	Yes	No	Yes	Yes	Yes	Yes

== Monetary features ==
Software	Budget management	Time tracking	Invoicing
24SevenOffice	Yes	Yes	Yes
AnyChart (AnyGantt)	No	Yes	No
Apache Allura	No	No	No
Apache OFBiz	Yes	Yes	Yes
Apache Bloodhound	No	No	No
Asana	No	Yes	No
Assembla	No	Yes	No
Axosoft	No	Yes	No
Basecamp	No	No	No
BigGantt	No	Yes	No
BigPicture	No	Yes	No
Calligra Plan	No	No	No
CEITON	Yes	Yes	Yes
Clarizen	Yes	Yes	No
ConceptDraw Project	Yes	Yes	No
Copper Project	Yes	Yes	Yes
dotProject	No	Yes (Note: Includes a very simple time tracking mechanism, enough to produce relevant data for invoicing as well as to compare it with the actual overall budget.)	Yes
DynaRoad	Yes	Yes	No
Easy Redmine	Yes	Yes	No
Easy projects	Yes	Yes	Yes
eGroupWare	No	Yes	No
enQuire	Yes	Yes	Yes
FastTrack Schedule	No	No	No
Feng Office Community Edition	No	Yes	Yes
FinancialForce.com	No	Yes	Yes
FogBugz	No	Yes	No
FusionForge	No	Yes	No
Genius Project	Yes	Yes	Yes
Hall.com	No	No	No
Helix ALM	No	Yes	No
HP Project & Portfolio Software	No	No	No
Huddle	No	No	No
Hyperoffice	No	Yes	No
Jira	No	Yes	No
Launchpad	No	No	No
LibrePlan	No	Yes	No
LiquidPlanner	No	Yes	No
MacProject	No	No	No
MantisBT	No	Yes	No
Microsoft Dynamics AX	Yes	Yes	Yes
Microsoft Office Project Server	Yes	Yes	No
Microsoft Project	Yes	Yes	No
Microsoft SharePoint Server	No	No	No
Microsoft Team Foundation Server	No	No	No
Milestones Professional	No	No	No
MyWorkPLAN	Yes	No	No
NetPoint	No	No	No
NetSuite	Yes	Yes	No
O3Spaces	No	No	No
OmniPlan	No	No	No
OnePager Pro	No	No	No
Open Workbench	No	No	No
OpenProj	No	No	No
OpenProject	Yes	Yes	No
Oracle Primavera EPPM (Primavera P6)	Yes	Yes	No
phpGroupWare	No	No	No
PHProjekt	No	Yes	No
Pivotal Tracker	No	No	No
Planisware	Yes	Yes	Yes
PLANTA Project	Yes	Yes	No
Project KickStart	No	No	No
Project Team Builder	No	No	No
ProjectLibre	Yes	Yes	No
ProjectManager.com	Yes	Yes	No
Project.net	No	Yes	Yes
Projectplace	No	No	No
ProjeQtOr	Yes	Yes	Yes
Proliance	No	No	No
Prolog	Yes	Yes	Yes
Pyrus	Yes	Yes	Yes
RationalPlan	Yes	Yes	Yes
Redmine	No	Yes	No
SAP Business ByDesign	Yes	Yes	Yes
Sciforma	Yes	Yes	No
Scoro	Yes	Yes	Yes
Severa	No	Yes	No
Smartsheet	No	No	No
Streamtime Software	Yes	Yes	Yes
Spider Project	Yes	Yes	Yes
TaskJuggler	No	No	No
Teamcenter	Yes	Yes	No
TeamDynamixHE	Yes	Yes	No
TeamLab	No	No	No
Tom's Planner	No	No	No
Trac	No	No	No
TrackerSuite.Net	No	Yes	No
Traction TeamPage	No	Yes	No
Trello	No	No	No
Tuleap	No	No	No
Twproject	Yes	Yes	No
UniPhi	Yes	Yes	Yes
VPMi	Yes	Yes	No
web2project	No	No	No
Workamajig	Yes	Yes	No
Workfront	Yes	Yes	No
WorkPLAN Enterprise	No	Yes	No
Workspace.com	No	Yes	No
Wrike	No	Yes	No
Zoho Projects	Yes	Yes	Yes

== See also ==
- Kanban (development)
- Project management software
- Project planning
- Comparison of scrum software
- Comparison of development estimation software
- Comparison of source-code-hosting facilities
- Comparison of CRM systems
