= Severa =

Severa may refer to:

- Severa (software), a professional services automation tool
- Santa Severa, a frazione of the comune of Santa Marinella, in the province of Rome, Lazio, Italy
- A Severa (film), a 1931 Portuguese film by Leitão de Barros
- Pravda Severa, Russian Arkhangelsk-based newspaper, published since 1917

== People with the surname ==
- Aquilia Severa, second and fourth wife of Emperor Elagabalus
- Claudia Severa, literate Roman woman, the wife of Aelius Brocchus
- Ernst Severa (born 1934), Austrian sprint canoer
- Leopoldo Felíz Severa, Puerto Rican politician and senator
- Marcia Otacilia Severa, Empress of Rome and wife of Emperor Marcus Julius Philippus or Philip the Arab
- Maria Severa-Onofriana (1820–1846), fado singer
- Marina Severa (died before 375), Empress of Rome and first wife of Emperor Valentinian I
- Ronald Severa (born 1936), American water polo player

== See also ==
- Euterebra severa, a species of sea snail
- Mackenziaena severa, a species of bird
- Thelcticopis severa, a species of huntsman spider
- La severa matacera, a Colombian musical group formed in Bogotá at the end of 1995
