= Kickstart =

Kickstart, Kick start or KickStart may refer to:

- Kick start, starting an engine (usually that of a motorcycle) by pushing a ratcheting lever with the rider's foot

== Arts and entertainment ==
- Kick Start (TV series), a British motorcycle show
- Kick Start, a 1995v compilation album by The Lambrettas
- "Kickstarts" (song), by Example, 2010

== Organizations ==
- Kickstart Kids, an American charity founded by Chuck Norris
- KickStart International, a Kenyan irrigation technology non-profit organization

== Technology ==
- Kickstart (Amiga), the bootstrap firmware of Commodore Amiga computers
- Kickstart (Linux), a network installation system for some Linux distributions
- Yahoo Kickstart, a former professional social media network
- KickStart, codename for the BlackBerry Pearl smartphone
- Kickstart, a wearable orthosis walking system by Cadence Biomedical
- Project KickStart, project management software

== Other uses ==
- Kickstart, a British Homes and Communities Agency funding programme for private housing
- Kickstart, a range of Mountain Dew flavors and varieties
- Kickstart FC, an Indian football club from Karnataka
  - Kickstart FC (women)

== See also ==
- Kickstarter, a crowdfunding platform
