= Omniplan =

Omniplan may refer to

- OmniPlan, management software created by The Omni Group
- Omniplan (architects), an American architecture design firm
