= Workspace (disambiguation) =

Workspace is a term used in various branches of engineering and economic development.

Workspace may also refer to:

- Workspace (GUI), the grouping of windows in some window managers
- Google Workspace, a collection of cloud computing, productivity and collaboration tools, software and products
- Workspace Group, a real estate investment trust
- Workspace.com, a provider of an online collaborative workspace for information technology teams
