= TDX (disambiguation) =

TDX is the Tanadgusix Corporation, a shareholder-owned Aleut Alaska Native village corporation.

TDX may also refer to:

== Technology ==
- TeamDynamix, an american software vendor
- Trust Domain Extensions, a CPU-level technology proposed by Intel
- TDX, an Intel chipset
- TDX, a prototype for the TD-2 microwave relay system developed by Bell Labs

== Other uses ==
- TDX Group, a company now owned by Equifax
- Theta Delta Chi, a social fraternity
- Trat Airport (IATA: TDX), Trat, Thailand
