= Enquire =

Enquire and similar may mean:

- ENQUIRE, the predecessor of the World Wide Web
- EnQuire - Grants Project & Contract Management, a web based software application

== See also ==
- enquiry, for the act of asking
- wikt:enquiry
