= Open Workbench =

Project management software

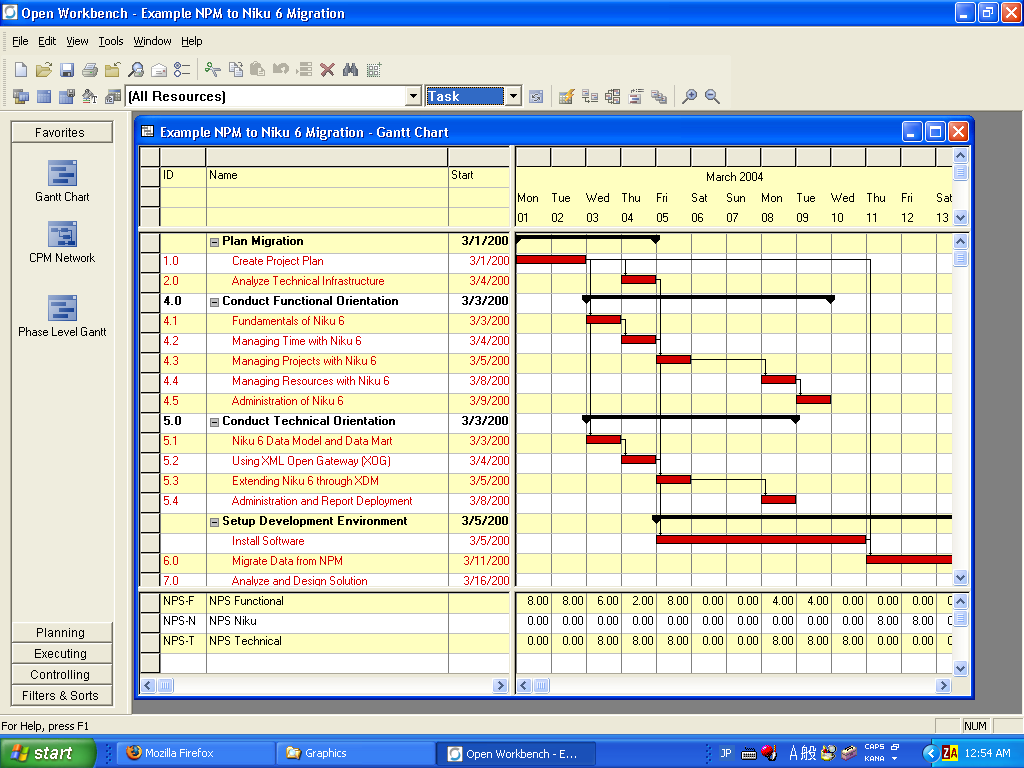
- Screenshot Open Workbench under Windows XP
- Developer: CA Technologies (formerly Niku)
- Final release: 1.1.6 / March 3, 2008
- Operating system: Microsoft Windows with Sun/Oracle JRE 1.3.1 or later
- Type: Project management software
- License: MPL Proprietary EULA
- Website: Version 1.1.4: Sourceforge

Open Workbench is a free project management software focused on scheduling. It is an alternative to Microsoft Project.

== History ==
Open Workbench was originally (1984) developed by Christopher H. Murray and Danek M. Bienkowski under the name "Project Manager Workbench" (PMW). They later changed the name to "Project Workbench" (PW). Outside of the US and South America this was marketed by Hoskyns as "Project Manager Workbench" (PMW). Niku Corporation, founded by Rhonda and Farzad Dibachi in 1998, purchased ABT and its products in 2000. Niku decided to make the software open source and renamed it Open Workbench. Computer Associates, now CA Technologies, purchased Niku in 2005.

In 2009 CA Technologies partnered with itdesign GmbH to update Open Workbench. The new version was due to feature a Windows 7 look and feel UI along with other added functions. By the end of 2010 a beta, unsupported version 2.0 was released on the itdesign website. A beta version 2.1 appeared later. However no supported version was released, and the program appears to be no longer actively developed.

The openworkbench.org website, created by Niku in 2000 to promote the free version, has been not working since January 2011.

However, version 1.1.4 hosted on SourceForge is still downloaded around 270 times per week (as of 10/2017).

== Open Workbench features ==
There are differences between Open Workbench and Microsoft Project. Chief among them is that Open Workbench schedules based on effort whereas MS Project's default scheduling method is based on duration, although the user can change the method to work (effort). In other words, in an Open Workbench plan, task schedule is driven by the number of hours each resource will work per week to cover the total number of hours required for the tasks, whereas Microsoft Project does the reverse by generating estimates for the resources based on the task duration rather than their work availability. For this reason, resource leveling is also different: Open Workbench will do it based on resource availability whereas MS Project will do it based on the next available block of time that fits the task.

Open Workbench cannot open .mpp files produced by Microsoft Project. Transfer of project data between MS Project and Open Workbench has to take place using an XML file.

Open Workbench runs under Microsoft Windows 2000, XP, Vista, and 7. It requires Java Runtime Environment version 1.3.1 or later.

Although Open Workbench is provided as free software, users require the CA Clarity PPM suite if they want to use a central database to manage enterprise collaboration. Clarity's Schedule Connect module adds database access to Open Workbench's screens; it must be installed on both the central server and the desktops.

== The "open source" controversy ==
Open Workbench claims to be open source. However, the source code available through SourceForge does not include "scheduling algorithms [which] are currently not open sourced and will be maintained by CA Technologies (Computer Associates)".

Furthermore, the available source code is old, dating back to version 1.1.4 of 2005. The source code for Open Workbench 1.1.6 is not available.

== See also ==
- List of project management software
- ProjectLibre, another open source project management program aiming to replace Microsoft Project
