= Web2project =

Web-based multi-user, multi-language project management application

web2project
- Developers: Pedro Azevedo, Bruce Bodger, D. Keith Casey, Jr., Trevor Morse
- Stable release: 3.4 / December 31, 2018; 7 years ago
- Operating system: Any
- Platform: PHP
- Type: Project management
- License: Pre-3.0 GPL v2 3.0 and later BSD style
- Website: web2project.net

web2project is or was a web-based, multi-user, multi-language project management application. All information in this article is from 2018 or earlier; as viewed 11 December 2025, the project website is inoperable. It is an open-source software and free for any uses and is maintained by an open community of volunteer programmers. web2project, as collaborative software, allows for real-time interaction between task assignees and updates for participants.

== History ==
web2project started as a fork of dotProject in late 2007.

Since the entire original team membership consisted of former dotProject contributors, the design and development decisions were quite similar to dotProject itself. As time went on, the systems diverged though web2project has maintained a "converter" which allows dotProject users to perform a one-way conversion to web2project. At present, the web2project community suffers from fewer add-on modules and a smaller community in general.

As of July 2010, web2project is available via RPM install for Mandriva Linux.

== Features ==
Basic data elements and management functions include:

- Projects and Tasks
- Contact Manager with vCard support
- Resource / Asset Manager
- Gantt charts, Export via PDF or simple JPEG images
- Calendar with user-based time zones, Syndication via iCalendar (supports Outlook, Thunderbird, Google Calendar, etc.)
- Reporting
- Project file manager
- Related Weblinks Manager
- Access control via ACL including respect for private events, tasks, and contacts
- Audit Log of all activities by all users
- Translation System supporting Czech, German, English, Spanish, Farsi, French, Italian, Polish, Portuguese, Brazilian Portuguese, and Russian

== Support ==
The primary means of day-to-day support is provided free by volunteers in both the forums and via online documentation.

== See also ==
- Project management
- List of project management software
