= PLANTA Project =

Project management software

- Developer(s): PLANTA Projektmanagement-Systeme GmbH
- Initial release: 1980; 45 years ago
- Stable release: 39.5.15 / April 2020
- Written in: C, C++, Python, C#
- Operating system: Cross-platform
- Type: Project management software
- License: Proprietary EULA
- Website: https://www.planta.de/en

PLANTA Project is a Project management software for the planning and control of projects that share the same resources. PLANTA Project is the successor to the multi-project management system PPMS, which was introduced in 1980. Unlike its predecessor PPMS, PLANTA Project offers process-oriented project management (based on the DIN 69901-2 norm, Project Management Institute (PMI), PRINCE2 or customer specific) and has a revised workflow-oriented interface, based on the open-source programming language Python, and MS .NET with panel technology which enables users to position windows as required.

PLANTA Project has been described as a flexible multi-project management software with particular strength in the areas of project and portfolio controlling. “Its strength lies in the combination of a well-developed resource and time management module with coherent portfolio management and budgeting functionality.”

With PLANTA pulse it is possible to use PLANTA Project as a hybrid project management system. PLANTA pulse "can be used as independent web-based solution for agile project management. However, it is also connected to PLANTA Project. This enables integrated hybrid project management."

== Description ==
"PLANTA cannot only be used for operational project scheduling and resource management; it may also be used for strategic portfolio-planning support." There is a "basic workflow support, which currently can control the lifecycle of projects, ideas and requests."

The manufacturer claims that there is no limitation on the number of projects that can be planned in PLANTA Project, meaning that the complete company project portfolio from project ideas through to planned projects with resources and costs can be administered with the tool. It also claims a special feature for PLANTA Project in the clear representation of enterprise resource planning showing at a glance which resources are available on a particular date. The planning module provides a detailed, hierarchical work breakdown structure together with milestone planning and milestone trend analysis as well as the representation of the schedule as a Gantt.

== Enterprise Project Management System ==
PLANTA Project, along with the additional functional components PLANTA Portfolio for project portfolio management, PLANTA Request for Request Management or Change Management as well as PLANTA Link for the exchange of data with other systems (e.g. with ERP systems) is an Enterprise Project Management System (see "Product Portfolio: Software products for company wide project management" on page 284 of Reference 4: Meyer & Ahlemann, 2014).

== Application areas ==
Industries and reference customers: IT, engineering, pharmaceuticals, military, aviation, automotive, banking, insurance, construction industry, public administration (see Ref. 4, p. 285-286)

== Multi-project functionality ==
- Entire project overview with core information and project manager estimates for important project parameters.
- Time Tracking module: "The software's scheduling and time-management functionality can be regarded as almost complete. Activities can be supplied with many kinds of dependencies and constraints and time lags can be taken into consideration." (see Ref. 4, p. 287)
- Project templates for easy project creation.
- Risk Management with risk check lists allowing quick evaluation of project risks.
- Classification of projects is also possible (e.g. for ABC analysis).
- Numerous reports allowing evaluation of project progress and costs (project status reports allowing the archiving of key project figures, milestone trend analysis, Earned Value analysis, variance analysis).
- Simulation of planned projects is possible and after project approval the project can be opened for time bookings.
- Program management
- Process management, workflow management (library of workflows)
- PLANTA standard software is provided in German, English and French. The following languages are also available: Spanish; Italian; Portuguese; Czech; Polish; Russian. More languages on request.

== Development ==
The software was developed as a part of a BMFT research project at the University of Karlsruhe and is used by around 50.000 people over 530 company licenses, primarily in Germany, Switzerland and other European countries.

Partnerships: Microsoft Partner (Gold Application Development), IBM, Oracle, member of GPM - Deutsche Gesellschaft für Projektmanagement e.V. (German Society for Project Management), Alliance Partner von Fujitsu Siemens Computers

== General technical specifications ==
Modern 3-tier client/server architecture (C/C++), thin client: rapid handling of large data volumes, centralized data set, shared pool of resources and management of access rights and users (role-based), easy definition of individual roles.

== See also ==
- List of project management software
