= UniPhi =

UniPhi is a Project management software founded by Mark Heath. UniPhi spun out of mbh management in 2011 following the roll out of AECOM's Global Unite project.

== History ==
In 2011, UniPhi was introduced to the Global Unite initiative, which involved the implementation of a new client-servicing model. This model captured snapshots of project information from their bespoke cost estimating tools and transferred this data into UniPhi's The Enterprise software. This information then went through a new and improved quality assurance methodology, with UniPhi's software development team building a global data warehouse and analysis services model that would harvest this information to be utilised within any of the 120 offices around the globe. UniPhi's core application was licensed and deployed globally to provide the core architecture of cost plan data capture in a way that enabled portfolio benchmarking. This increased speed to market and generated cost savings.

Another organization that used the software in 2011 was SKM. When the people in charge of the Queensland Flood Recovery road reconstruction program were planning the A$800 million venture, they realized that traditional project management using spreadsheets and Gantt charts would be insufficient.

== Types ==
=== Web-based ===
UniPhi can be used either on the web via desktop computer or through mobile application. The software bundles four main solutions including UniPhi The Enterprise, UniPhi Major Projects, UniPhi Your Business and UniPhi OnSite.

== Recognition ==
UniPhi was awarded an ABA 100 award in 2014 for innovation for its involvement in the AECOM Global Unite project business award

UniPhi was awarded an ABA 100 award in 2015 and 2017 for product innovation and software innovation respectively.

The Global Unite project won an internal award for innovation at AECOM in 2013

UniPhi was marked as "Companies to Watch" in the weekly Rust Report

== Reviews ==
The product has been reviewed by:

Google Play, Managing by Project, Rust Report

== See also ==
- Project Management
- Project management software
- List of project management software
- Comparison of project management software
- Program Management
- Portfolio Management
- Project Portfolio Management
