= Onepager Pro =

OnePager Pro
- Developers: Chronicle Graphics, Inc.
- Stable release: 8.0.10 / June 18, 2026; 4 months ago
- Written in: Microsoft .Net
- Operating system: Windows
- Type: Project management software
- License: Proprietary
- Website: www.onepager.com/products/onepager.php

OnePager is a project management software package published by Chronicle Graphics, Inc., based in Denver, Colorado. OnePager is primarily designed as a project presentation and reporting tool, creating Gantt charts, timelines, and schedule summaries based on data from other project management software such as Microsoft Project, Smartsheet, and Planisware. In 2012, the company trademarked the term "Gantt Art" to describe the visuals that OnePager creates.

== Features ==
- Creating presentation-ready Gantt charts
- Conditional formatting of project timelines
- Summarizing one or multiple project plans
- Dynamically grouping and sorting tasks in a project schedules
- Tracking project changes over time with versioned snapshots
- Showing dependencies between project tasks and milestones

== Product History ==
OnePager was first released in 2007, originally as a lighter version of Chronicle Graphics' TimeArrow project analysis software. OnePager contained all of the visualization capabilities of TimeArrow, but none of the more in-depth analysis capabilities. OnePager grew rapidly in popularity, eventually surpassing the install base of TimeArrow. In 2010, Chronicle Graphics sunset the TimeArrow product and began transitioning all of its customers to OnePager.

Chronicle Graphics releases a new version of OnePager approximately once per year, with OnePager 8.0 coming out in early 2026. Between major releases, OnePager users also receive minor updates several times per year based on input from the user community.

OnePager is primarily used by project managers and schedulers in the pharmaceutical and aerospace industries, though numerous financial services firms and federal government agencies have also standardized on the software. OnePager is widely used in the United States, Canada and other English speaking countries, though there is a Japanese-language version of the software available in Japan as well.

== Editions ==
OnePager Pro, released in 2007, imports from Microsoft Project and Project Server.

OnePager Bundle, released in 2022, offers support for multiple project management platforms, with direct connections to Smartsheet, Primavera P6, Planisware, Microsoft Planner, Wrike, and Asana in addition to Microsoft Project and Excel.

OnePager Express, released in 2009, is designed for project managers who manage their projects in Excel, though it is also commonly used to interface with other project management software such as Jira, Planview, and among others.

== Reviews ==
OnePager has been reviewed by Tactical Project Management, PM Network, Bright Hub, and Webucator, among others.
