= Endeavour Software Project Management =

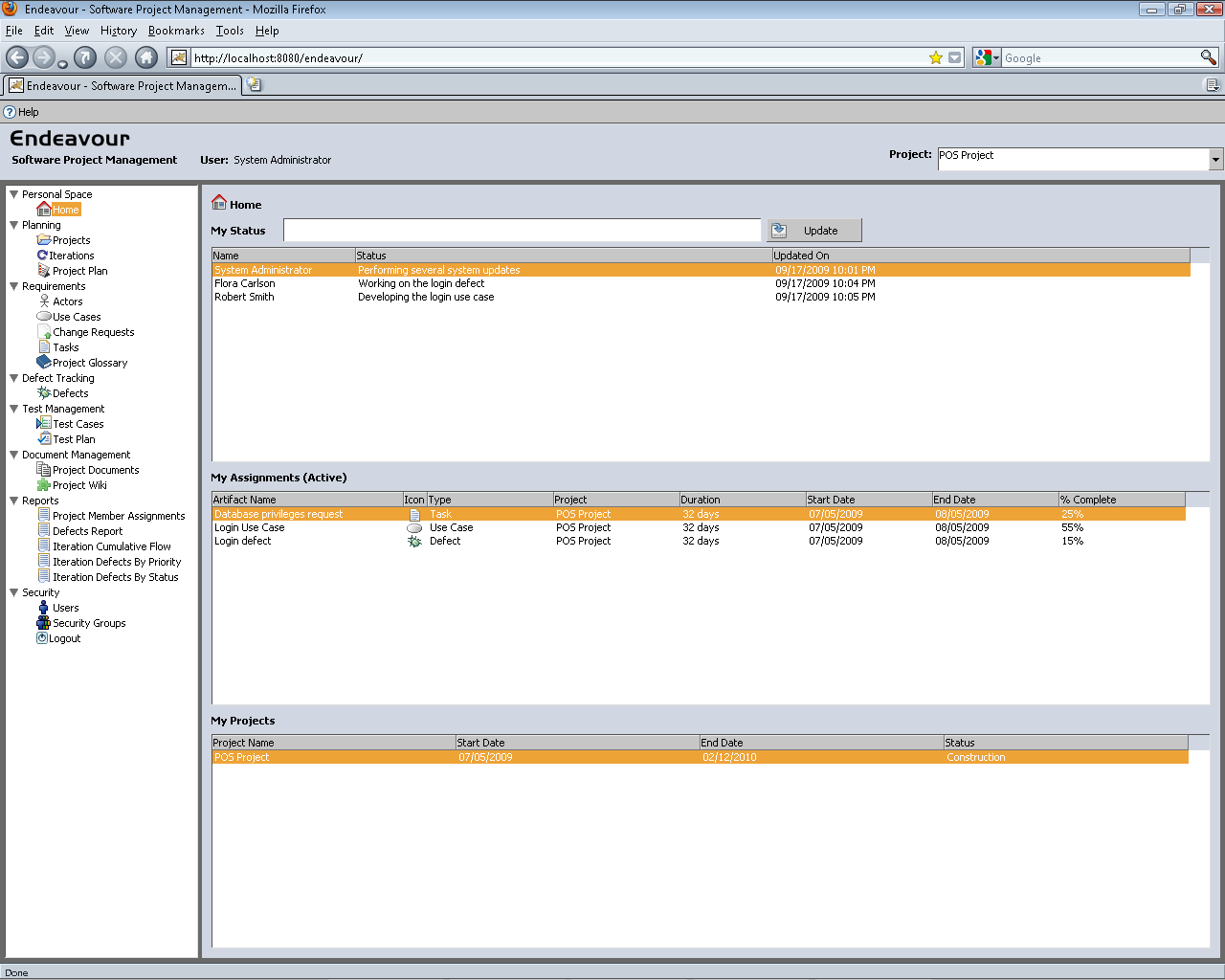
- Endeavour's Home Page
- Developer: Ezequiel Cuellar
- Stable release: 1.25 / 1 May 2011; 14 years ago
- Written in: Java
- Operating system: Cross-platform
- Type: Project management software
- License: GPL (free software)
- Website: endeavour-mgmt.sourceforge.net

Endeavour Software Project Management is an open-source solution to manage large-scale enterprise software projects in an iterative and incremental development process.

== History ==
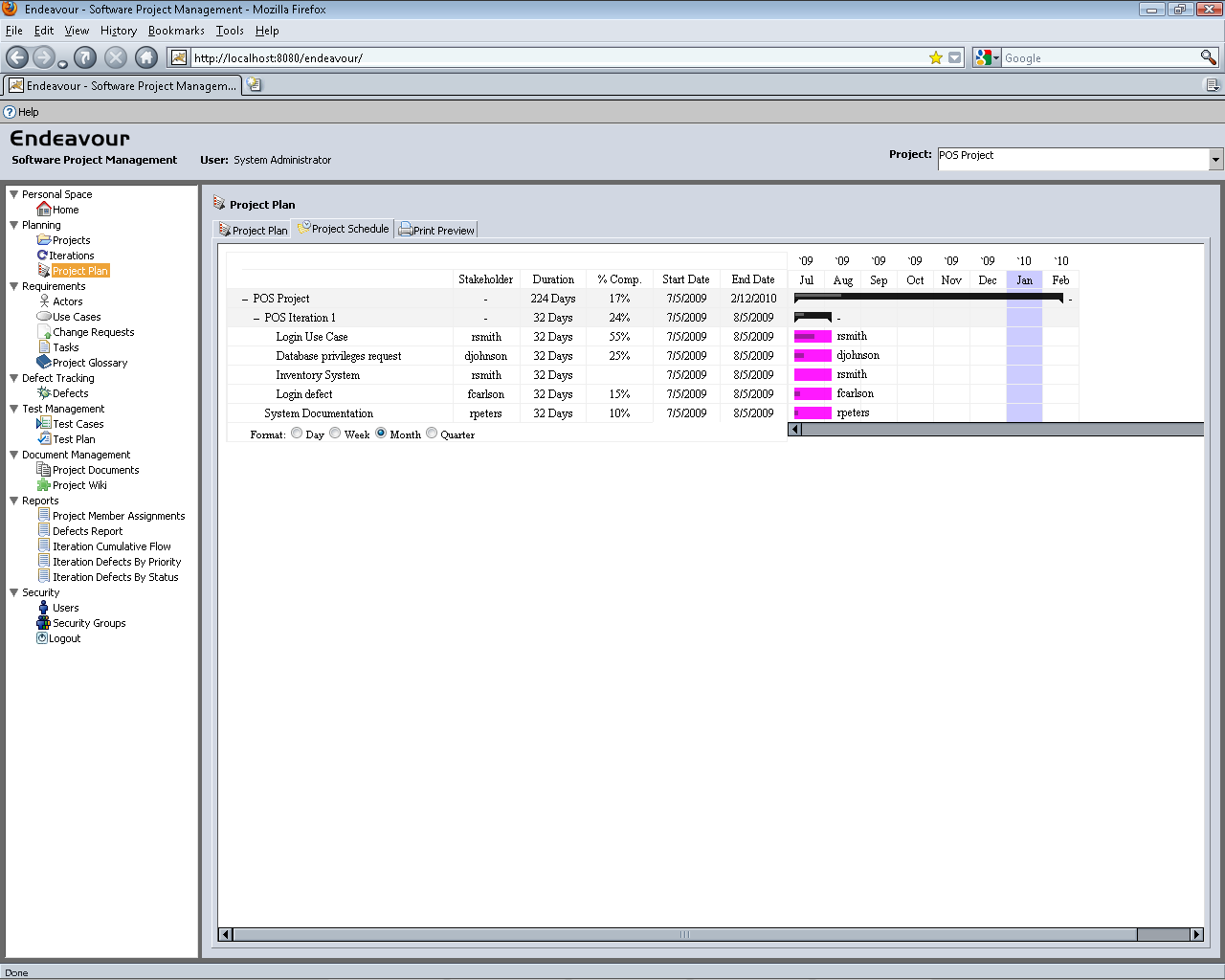
Endeavour's Project Plan Gantt Chart

Endeavour Software Project Management was founded in September 2008 with the intention to develop a solution for replacing expensive and complex project management systems that is easy to use, intuitive, and realistic by eliminating features considered unnecessary.

In September 2009, the project was registered in SourceForge. In April 2010, the project was included in SourceForge's blog with an average of 210 weekly downloads.

== Features ==
The major features include support for the following software artifacts:

- Projects
- Use cases
- Iterations
- Project plans
- Change requests
- Defect tracking
- Test cases
- Test plans
- Task
- Actors
- Document management
- Project glossary
- Project Wiki
- Developer management
- Reports (assignments, defects, cumulative flow)
- SVN browser integration with Svenson
- Continuous Integration with Hudson
- Email notifications
- Fully internationalizable

== System requirements ==
Endeavour Software Project Management can be deployed in any Java EE-compliant application server and any relational database running under a variety of different operating systems. Its cross-browser capability allows it to run in most popular web browsers.

== Usage ==
- Software project management
- Iterative and incremental development
- Use-case-driven
- Issue tracking
- Test-case management software
- Integrated wiki

== See also ==
- Project management software
- List of project management software
