= ProjeQtOr =

Project management application

- Developer(s): Pascal BERNARD
- Initial release: June 25, 2009; 16 years ago
- Stable release: 12.0.0 / December 13, 2024; 7 months ago
- Repository: https://sourceforge.net/projects/projectorria/
- Operating system: Windows, Unix, Linux, macOS
- Available in: 16 languages
- Type: Project management software
- License: AGPLv3+
- Website: www.projeqtor.org

ProjeQtOr is an Open Source project management software. The acronym stands for Quality based Project Organizer, as the software offers quality management features like indicators, alerts and workflow. Until 2013 it was called Project'Or RIA (Project Organizer Rich Internet Application).
It is used as a free alternative to proprietary software in French administration, managing 450 projects for 75 projects managers.

Features offered are, as synthesized by "Find The Best" and "I love free software":

- Management of tasks and milestones
- Work and Teams Management
- Incident Management with bug tracking
- Multi-Projects Management
- Deployment of resources on a project only when necessary
- Storing all project documents in one space
- Risks Management
- Managing budgets and expenses
- Collaborative Web Architecture
- Multi-platforms (Windows, Linux)

ProjeQtOr relies on PHP with a MySQL or PostgreSQL database and the Apache web server as dependencies.

In the book "Démarche et outil de gestion de portefeuille de projets informatiques" (approach and tool for project portfolio management), this tool is proposed as a credible free alternative to the proprietary software "Genius Project" (distributed by IBM).

Project sources are available on SourceForge. Distribution license is GPL V3. On editor's website, change history shows of a major release about every 2 months since July 2010.
