= Copper Project =

- Developer: Element Software
- Release: 2001
- Operating system: Cross-platform
- Type: Project management
- License: Proprietary
- Website: www.copperproject.com

Copper Project is a proprietary web-based project-management tool, first launched in 2001 by Element Software. As of 2011, it is used predominantly by creative consultancies. Copper is provided via SAAS.

The software intends to provide project and file management features, alongside other business elements such as invoicing and time sheets.

== Reviews ==
The Copper Project was voted one of the Top 20 Project Management Software products 2013.

The software has been featured in publications such as Mashable.

== See also ==
- Project management software
- List of project management software
- Project management
- Web 2.0
