= Project.net =

- A sample view of project scheduling from an older version
- Original author: Project.net Inc.
- Developer: Integrated Computer Solutions
- Final release: v9.3 / June 13, 2012; 14 years ago
- Written in: Java
- Operating system: Cross-platform
- Type: Project management software
- License: GPL (free software)
- Website: www.project.net

Project.net was an open-source, enterprise scale project management application for Microsoft Windows and Unix operating systems. Project.net is commercial open source. Support and training was available from Project.net Inc. of Bedford, Massachusetts. Around october, 2022 (ten years after the last update) the project webpage was replaced by a contact form for the original parent company of Project.net: Integrated Computer Solutions, Inc..

== History ==
Project.net was founded in 1999 to develop project collaboration applications using Internet technologies. The company's initial focus was building and deploying a collaboration engine for use by public and private web-based exchanges. In 2002, PC Magazine awarded Project.net with the Editors' Choice award in a review of web-based project management applications.

Project.net was acquired by Integrated Computer Solutions in 2006 and launched the open source version of Project.net’s project and portfolio management (PPM) application. The Open Source Business Conference awarded three open source projects (including Project.net) as "ones to watch" shortly after the acquisition.

Project.net was used by more than 50,000 people worldwide in the 2010s to help manage their projects. University Business Magazine published an article on Project and Portfolio Management that reviews the need for and use of Project.net in the facilities department at Cornell University.

The project.net webpage content was removed in October, 2022, replaced by an ICS contact form, and project management software is not listed in ISC portfolio.

== License ==
Project.net was available via the GNU General Public License or a commercial license if preferred by the user. However, Project.net cannot be used without an Oracle database, which is a commercial product.

== Usage ==
- Project and portfolio management
- Collaboration
- Issue tracking
- Integrated Wiki
- Integrated Blog

== See also ==
- Project management software
- List of project management software
