= DynaRoad =

Project management software for civil engineering

- Developer(s): Topcon Positioning Systems, Inc.
- Operating system: Microsoft Windows
- Type: Project management software
- License: Proprietary
- Website: www.dynaroad.com

DynaRoad is a project management software for heavy civil engineering projects. It is used for planning the mass hauls of an earthworks project, creating a construction schedule, and monitoring the progress of the project.

The program's development started in 1999, when Finnish earthworks contractors, the Construction Economics Lab of Helsinki University of Technology and the DynaRoad company started developing a new project management and earthmoving software. The program has been used in road projects between 3 and 60 km in length, such as the E18 Muurla-Lohja motorway in Finland and the E4 road in Hudiksvall, Sweden.

== Features ==
The software has a Windows graphical user interface and it includes views such as the Gantt chart, resource graph, mass haul diagram, map view, time distance chart and text reports. The time-location method has strengths compared to Gantt charts and traditional scheduling. The map view indicates live tasks at any moment using different colors. For cut and fill operations, a haul plan based on quantities, bulking factors, possible haul routes and production rates can be calculated automatically.

== Competition ==
LinearPlus and TILOS are examples of other software for linear scheduling.

Scetauroute Masster is a software used in France for mass haul optimization.

Microsoft Project and Primavera are popular project management software in the construction industry.

== See also ==
- Comparison of project management software
