= PHProjekt =

- Original author(s): Albrecht Günther
- Developer(s): Mayflower GmbH
- Stable release: 6.2.1 / October 9, 2012
- Repository: github.com/mayflower/PHProjekt
- Written in: PHP
- Operating system: Cross-platform
- Available in: English, German and Spanish
- Type: Project management
- License: GNU Lesser General Public License version 3
- Website: www.phprojekt.com

PHProjekt is a free groupware and project management web application written in PHP. It was created in the late 1990s by Albrecht Günther; since early 2006, Mayflower GmbH develops and supports PHProjekt along with Günther.

PHProjekt is the only Free software project management software included in the SimpleScripts script installer, and one of two included in the Fantastico script installer (along with dotProject). The software's functionality can be expanded through various add-on packages (including one for synchronization with Microsoft Outlook). PHProjekt is available in several languages.

After releasing version 6.2.1, Mayflower GmbH announced they will not continue the development of PHProjekt.

== Modules ==
- Overview
- Calendar
- Contacts
- Chat
- Forum
- Files
- Projects
- Time card
- Notes
- Helpdesk
- Mail
- Tasks
- Bookmark
- Survey System

== See also ==
- Project management software
- List of project management software
