= Workamajig =

- Developer(s): Creative Manager, Inc.
- Initial release: 2008
- Platform: Web
- Type: Project management, collaboration and productivity software
- Website: https://www.workamajig.com

Workamajig, formerly known as Creative Manager Pro, is a customizable, web-based project management software for creative groups, such as advertising agencies, design firms, in-house creative departments and public relations firms. The software is developed and marketed by Creative Manager, Inc. based in Anthem, Arizona. The company has an additional office in New Jersey. According to its website, more than 3,000 creative teams use Workamajig.

== History ==
In 1986, A La Carte Systems, Inc. began selling project management software to creative firms. A La Carte Systems merged with Streamline Technologies to form Creative Manager, Inc. in 2001. The software was originally named Creative Manager Pro. On May 8, 2008, the company changed the software name to Workamajig.

In 2009, a new tool was introduced to enhance client relationship management. This included the release of the 'Web to Lead' feature, which automatically captures and adds leads from client's marketing websites into the Workamajig database. In 2010, it added a WYSIWYG forms tool to enable users to drag and drop fields and logos into invoices and estimates. Workamajig expanded the drag and drop functionality in 2011, allowing users to drag templates into campaigns.

In an attempt to streamline new feature addition, Workamajig released Workamajig Labs in 2010. Users could use this platform to test new features before their release. It added support for File Server integration and Credit Card integration in Workamajig Labs in 2013 before making it available to other useRs.

In 2016, Workamajig discontinued the Flash version of its software and released an updated HTML5-based UI called "Platinum". This update was meant to address the lack of support for Flash in modern browsers and ongoing user-experience complaints.

In 2008, Workamajig held its first user group conference, Workology Conference 1.0 in Scottsdale, Arizona. Since then, it has held four iterations of the Workology conference to bring together creative professionals.

In March 2016, Hubspot included Workamajig in a list of 18 short reviews of "Agency Project Management Software Options to Consider". In September 2017, Workamajig was featured on Project-Management.com as part of "14 Project Management Tools You May Not Know About"

== See also ==
- List of collaborative software
- List of project management software
- Comparison of project management software
