= NetPoint =

Project management software

- Screenshot of NetPoint Version 3.
- Developer: PMA Technologies
- Stable release: Version 4.2 / April 17, 2014
- Written in: C++
- Operating system: Microsoft Windows
- Type: Project management software
- License: Proprietary
- Website: PMA Technologies Homepage

NetPoint is a graphically-oriented project planning and scheduling software application first released for commercial use in 2009. NetPoint's headquarters are located in Chicago, Illinois. The application uses a time-scaled activity network diagram to facilitate interactive project planning and collaboration. NetPoint provides planning, scheduling, resource management, and other project controls functions.

NetPoint is capable of calculating schedules using both the Critical Path Method (CPM) as well as the Graphical Path Method (GPM).

Schedules created in NetPoint can be exported for use in Primavera, Microsoft Project, and other CPM-based Project management software.

== See also ==
- Project planning
- Project management
- Project management software
- Comparison of project management software
- Schedule (project management)
- Critical path method
