= TaskJuggler =

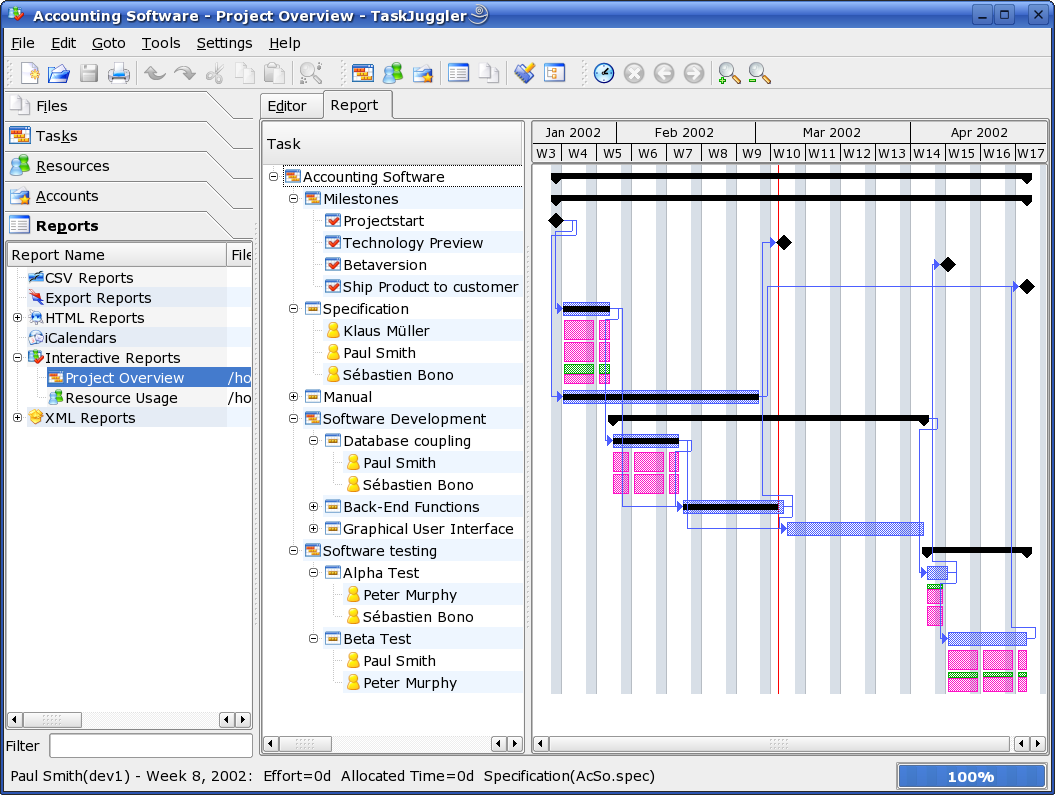
- Version 2.x.x TaskJuggler screenshot
- Developer: Chris Schlaeger
- Stable release: 3.8.4 / July 28, 2025
- Written in: C++, Ruby
- Operating system: Cross-platform
- Type: Project management software
- License: GPL
- Website: www.taskjuggler.org
- Repository: github.com/taskjuggler/TaskJuggler

TaskJuggler is GPL-licensed (free software) project management software that runs under the Linux and Unix operating systems and is programmed in C++ using the Qt toolkit and KDE libraries. It also works on Windows. The TaskJuggler Project was started in 2001 by Chris Schläger. Early releases provided a command line tool that generated HTML reports. From August 2005 to July 2010, the package also provided a graphical user interface based on the KDE libraries.

TaskJuggler III was released on 5 July 2010. It is a completely re-implemented version of the TaskJuggler 2.x series and written in Ruby. The graphical user interface from the 2.x version has not yet been ported to TaskJuggler 3.x; TaskJuggler 3 documents, which are plain text files, are edited with a text editor and processed on the command line.

== Approach ==
A TaskJuggler project consists of one or more plain text documents written in a domain-specific declarative programming language. The documents consist of a root project file and optional sub-files incorporated into the root by means of the include keyword (property in TaskJuggler lingo), to one or more levels. The TaskJuggler language reference refers to the project definition source document somewhat loosely as The TJP File. This discussion refers to the project definition source document simply as the TJP.

The TJP is a declarative document. The focal objects are tasks, resources, reports, scenarios, and scheduling constraints applied to tasks and resources. There is also a rudimentary facility to describe accounts and accrue costs and expenses. Project progress can be tracked by declaring task completeness properties (as a percentage) or resource booking properties which associate resources to tasks for specific durations, which can be used to generate schedule projections.

TaskJuggler functions as a report compilation tool. After TJP program is written, reports on the state of the project are generated by running the TaskJuggler compiler on the program. The TJP compiler includes a scheduling component based on a heuristic algorithm. TaskJuggler is able to generate a wide variety of reports including Gantt based on report declarations within the TJP. The TaskJuggler compiler is able to handle large projects with over 10,000 tasks, 1000 resources, and complex constraints.

== Non-incremental projection ==
A common feature of compilation tools shared by TaskJuggler is that future compilations (reports) do not necessarily reflect past outputs, even where the inputs are extremely similar. Any change to the project state as declared in the TJP can potentially result in a completely new schedule assignment being generated.

TaskJuggler presently contains (as of version 2.3.0) no provision for generating a minimal schedule change from an existing schedule projection based on a hypothetical input, such as "what if I assign Bob for four hours to the documentation task?". One can, however, feed desired elements from one projection output back into the TJP as additional constraints as fixed assumptions relative to further refinements of the schedule projection. Iterative constraint refinement is a powerful technique, but lacks the immediacy of incremental recalculation in a spreadsheet when used in a similar capacity as a financial projection tool.

== Advantages ==
The TaskJuggler design frees the project manager to focus on information that is known about the project at any stage of the project. TaskJuggler then turns this information into meaningful reports and charts. It supports the project manager in all phases of a project, from the initial idea, to effort estimation, budgeting and status tracking.

The textual project description sets TaskJuggler apart from other project management programs. It allows the user to focus on the work breakdown structure, task priorities and dependencies, the given resources and their availability. Based on the provided constraints TaskJuggler computes a schedule for the given task items. The built-in load balancer honors working hours and levels resource usage automatically. TaskJuggler computes task intervals, allocation times for every resource, and a profit/loss analysis for the project. These results can then be turned in a large number of reports by using a filtering mechanism that can be used to restrict the information to the subset to be presented.

== Disadvantages ==
The plain text project description is written in a hierarchical, declarative programming language that requires one to think abstractly about the sequencing and constraints in the project, as well as the structure of the program itself. A typical project has the following sections:

- Project Header
- Macro definitions
- Flag declarations
- Shift definitions
- Account definitions
- Resource definitions
- Task definitions
- Bookings
- Reports

While powerful, this complexity can lead to a steep learning curve for gaining proficiency in the use of TaskJuggler.

== See also ==
- List of project management software
