= BigTime Enterprise PSA =

Software development company

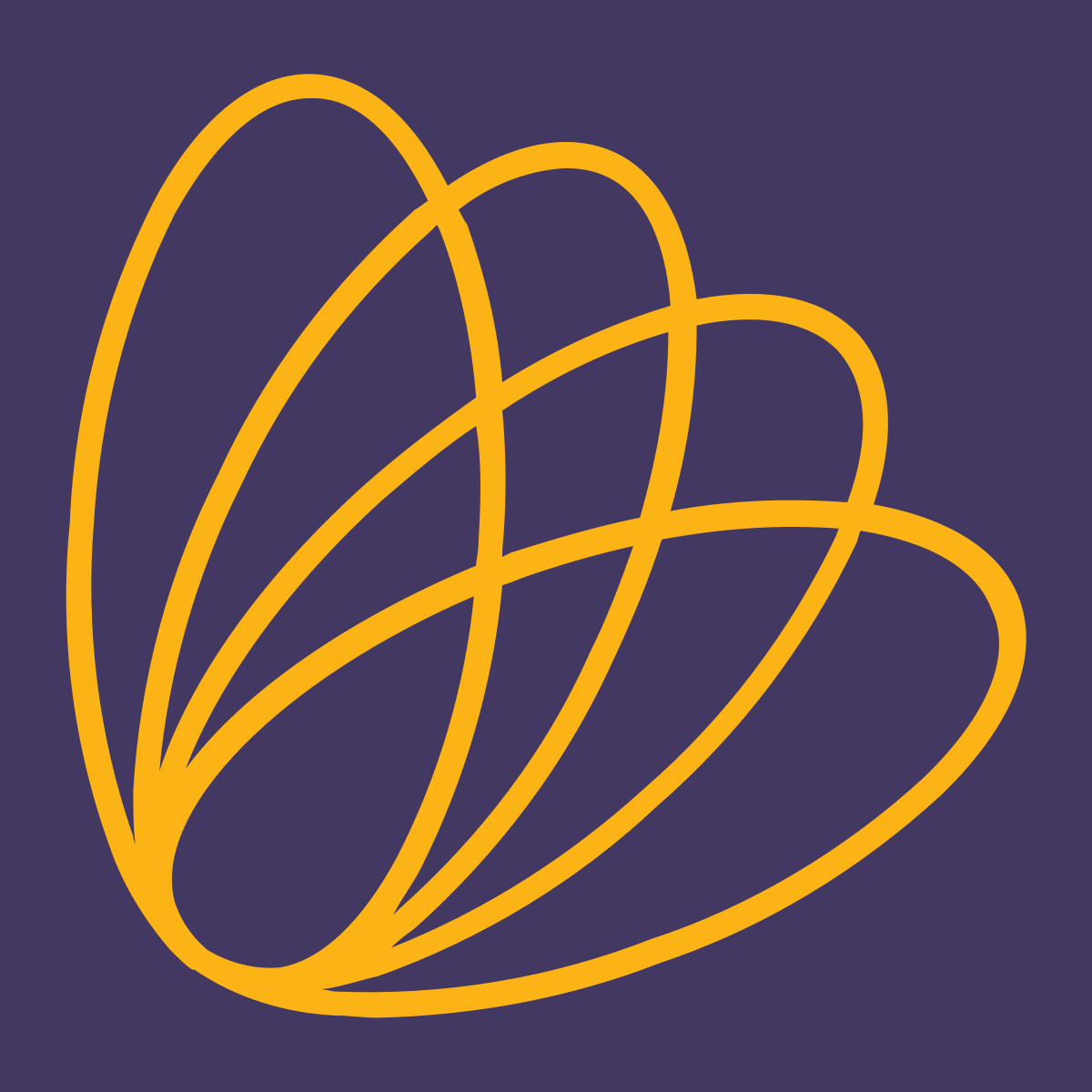
- Company type: Private company
- Industry: On-demand software
- Founded: 2003
- Headquarters: Boston, MA, U.S.
- Area served: Worldwide
- Key people: Denis Whelan; (CEO); Steve Chong; (COO)
- Products: Professional Services Automation Software
- Website: www.bigtime.net

BigTime Enterprise PSA, formerly Projector PSA, Inc., is a provider of cloud-based professional services automation (PSA) software. In 2022 the company was acquired by BigTime Software.

== History ==
Projector PSA (now BigTime Enterprise PSA) was started in 2002 by a group of employees at Agency.com. Their self-developed application used to manage Agency.com became the prototype for Projector PSA's main software offering, Projector. In 2003 Projector PSA, Inc. was formed and in mid-2004 they released the first version of Projector.

On July 12, 2022, the company was acquired by BigTime Software. As of October 2024, BigTime continues to offer Projector PSA services as BigTime Enterprise PSA.

== Software ==
BigTime Enterprise PSA is a business application that is intended to be used by project-based organizations. It is considered Professional Services Automation, or PSA software. BigTime Enterprise PSA is designed to help companies with project management, resource scheduling, and project accounting.

BigTime Enterprise PSA is a cloud-based application that allows users to access the application anywhere they have an internet connection. BigTime Enterprise PSA has two main interfaces, one called the Employee Portal and a second called the Management Portal. The Employee Portal is a browser-based application that has functionality for time entry, expense entry, document management, issue tracking, and viewing schedules.

BigTime Enterprise PSA has a mobile web application for time and expense entry that can be accessed on most smartphones.

BigTime Enterprise PSA's software is sold using the Software-as-a-Service or SaaS licensing model, and is being used by more than 19,000 users across 180 companies worldwide.

BigTime Enterprise PSA runs a user group called the Projector e_{3} Community.

== Awards and recognition ==
- Included in the Talking Cloud 2012 Top 100 Cloud Service Providers
- Included in the Top 10 PSA Software Vendors by Business-Software.com
- PSA with the highest level of customer satisfaction in the 2012 SPI Research Professional Services Benchmark Report

== See also ==
- Professional Services Automation Software
- Comparison of PSA Systems
- Project Management Software
- Comparison of Project Management Software
- Time Tracking Software
- Comparison of Time Tracking Software
