= BigPicture =

- Developers: AppFire, previously SoftwarePlant
- Initial release: 2014; 11 years ago
- Stable release: 8.14
- Written in: Java, Angular
- Operating system: Jira
- Platform: Jira Cloud, Jira Server, Jira Data Center
- Type: Project management software
- License: Proprietary, free trial for 30 days
- Website: marketplace.atlassian.com/apps/1212259/bigpicture-project-management-ppm

BigPicture is a project management and portfolio management app for Jira environment. First released in 2014 and developed by SoftwarePlant (now by AppFire), it delivers tools for project managers that the core Jira lacks, i.e. roadmap, a Gantt chart, Scope (work breakdown structure), risks, resources and teams modules.

== Product ==
BigPicture is web-based software available both for Jira Server, Data Center (hosted on-premises) and Jira Cloud (software-as-a-service). It focuses on visual representation and aggregation of Jira tasks. The Gantt chart module of BigPicture is available as a standalone app under the name BigGantt.

The software aids operations management through the Gantt chart and the resource modules, tactical planning through the WBS module and strategic management through the risk and roadmapping modules. Parts of the app comply with Scaled agile framework.

BigPicture is written in Java and Angular.

In 2020 BigPicture announced the inclusion of portfolio management, agile at scale capabilities, and integrations with third-party software (Trello).

== Reception ==
As of October 2023, BigPicture was known to be installed in at least 14,000 active Jira instances. It is used by organizations ranging from small businesses to large enterprises, including Apple, BMW, Intel, Tesla, Oracle, Bloomberg and Credit Suisse.

In September 2017 SoftwarePlant was named Atlassian Marketplace Vendor of the Year 2017 for fastest cloud growth.

In June 2021 SoftwarePlant was acquired by Appfire.
