= LiquidPlanner =

Software company

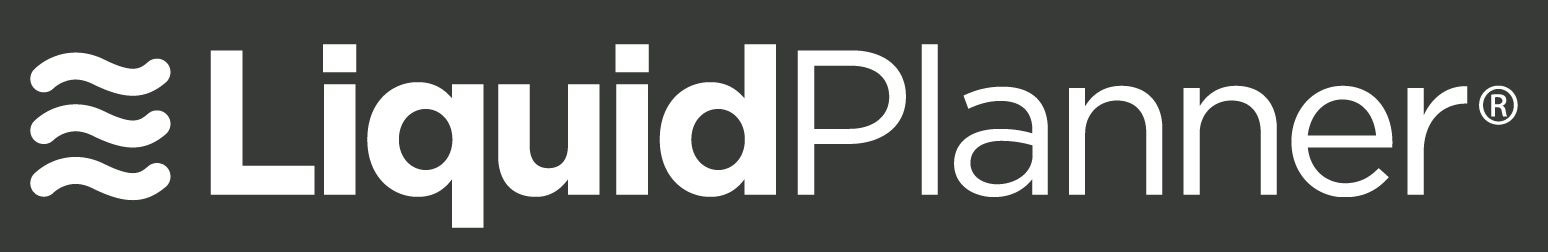
- Developers: LiquidPlanner, Inc.
- Release: January 27, 2006
- Platform: Ruby on Rails
- Type: Project management software Collaborative software
- License: Proprietary
- Website: liquidplanner.com

LiquidPlanner, Inc. is a company that develops online project management software.

The company was founded in 2006 in Seattle, Washington. Its first beta version went public in 2008.

LiquidPlanner is a platform-independent, online project management system which features range estimates (e.g. 3–5 days) to express the uncertainty in project schedules. The collaborative software is accessible via web browser or through its Android application.

== History ==
LiquidPlanner was founded by Charles Seybold and Jason Carlson in 2006, launching a public beta at the DEMO 08 conference. In November 2017, Todd Humphrey became CEO of the company, replacing Liz Pearce. In 2018, the company received $2 million in funding from investors. In February 2020, LiquidPlanner was dubbed by Purch Group's Business News Daily as the best online project management software for analyzing overall company data in 2020.

== Software ==
Built using Ruby on Rails, LiquidPlanner is the industry’s only priority-based, predictive online project management solution and claims to be the first software as a service (SaaS) based project management solution to allow users to express uncertainty in their task estimates using ranges. The application employs a probabilistic scheduling engine that is claimed to build more accurate schedules.

Several authors have noted that estimating in ranges (e.g. 3–4 days, 1–3 hours) is preferable to single-point estimates (e.g. 1 hour, 2 days). Steve McConnell states "simplistic single-point estimates are meaningless because they don't include any indication of the probability associated with the single-point." Project management and scheduling methodologies such as Program Evaluation and Review Technique (PERT) generate best-case/worst-case ranges. However, the preponderance of popular project management software does not readily accept ranges as inputs for estimates.

LiquidPlanner accepts ranges as estimates and infers a probability distribution from that range. It then uses the distributions and the relationships between tasks and people to calculate a distribution for the project as a whole. By exposing the uncertainty in estimates the developers of LiquidPlanner claim that the uncertainty can then be managed.It then tracks the evolution of these estimates over time. From these uncertainty measures over time it can plot the history of the project estimates. This type of plot is often referred to as the Cone of Uncertainty.

Project managers create workspaces and invite users to participate in a way similar to LinkedIn or Facebook. The workspace can contain multiple projects and keeps a running narrative of tasks, comments, documents, and other project collateral.

In September 2011, LiquidPlanner introduced their free mobile app that connects the LiquidPlanner online project management workspace to the Apple iPhone and iPad. This app is no longer available in Apple play store as of 2024.

The LiquidPlanner application programming interface (API) enables project managers to programmatically interact with their LiquidPlanner workspace. With the API, most of the LiquidPlanner project management actions can be automated. For example, you can create a task and then post comments, track time against it, and mark the task done when completed.

LiquidPlanner was founded in 2006. released its first public beta in 2008.

== Funding ==
LiquidPlanner is privately held. It was the first recipient of capital from the Seattle-based Alliance of Angels seed fund in June 2009.

== See also ==
- Comparison of time-tracking software
