= VPMi =

Project management software

VPMi (Virtual Project Management Internet)
- Developer: VCSonline
- Stable release: VPMi 5.1.18636 / November, 2014
- Type: Project management software
- Website: www.vcsonline.com

VPMi is a cloud-based suite of Project Portfolio Management software. It allows management for schedules, budgets, scope, alignment, and contains strategies, balanced scorecards, resources and documents. The VPMi suite was created to help prevent miscommunication between business units and IT staff. The VPMi suite originally comprised two software tools, VPMi Professional and VPMi Express, later merged into the new application VPMi. The application is developed by VCSonline, a company headquartered in Valley Park, just outside St. Louis, Missouri, with an additional office in Kolkata, India.

== History ==
VCS online was co-founded in 1998 by Nick Matteucci and Jeff Pupillo, two former Ernst & Young project management consultants. The first version of VPMi Professional was released in 1998. By 2003, the company had grown to 10 employees and a net worth of $1.3 million. Version 3.0 introduced "online process maps that show where different projects are located in their life cycles". The latest release of VPMi, version 5.1.18686, was released in November, 2014. The company currently employs a staff of 20.

== Implementation Options ==
Like other web based project management software, VPMi can be delivered as software as a service (SaaS) or through a local implementation. Updates and patches are released by VSConline monthly on each month's second Friday. Release Notes are made available on the Monday before the update release. These updates contain new features, bug fixes, and any other alterations made to the application. The current version 5.1 was released along with the release of the Workplan Gantt Editor in January, 2014.

== Version 5.1 Features ==
- Hybrid Forecasting: Added a new form of forecasting that combines team forecasting and workplan forecasting.
- Modify ETC through Assignments: Added the ability to modify ETC directly from the assignments page.
- Partial Time Period Lock: Added the ability to lock a time period partway through the week. This does not submit time, but prevents time from being modified within the locked period.
- People Audit: Tracks all changes to people, including roles.
- Service Request Single Routing: Improved routing for Service Requests so that it can be done from a single page.
- Time Audit: Tracks all changes to timesheets, allowing intensive auditing of time entry practices.
- User Defined Fields: Added a large number of custom fields with a new interface to improve customization.
- Workplan Gantt Editor: Create Workplans via a browser with drag and drop, includes critical path scheduling.

== Features ==
=== Workplan Gantt Editor ===
The Workplan Gantt Editor is a .NET tool designed to streamline the project management process. This reduces the need to reload pages and allows a project manager to review the effects of their changes prior to saving them. The editor contains two sides, a workplan side (see above) and a Gantt side (see below). The Workplan Gantt Editor lines up work-plan rows with Gantt rows to show relationships between items.

=== Dashboards ===
VPMi has the following dashboards: My Home, My Resources, My Projects, My Organizations, My Reports, My Calendar, Organization, Project, and Program. These dashboards also link to full records within VPMi.

=== Project Management ===
Projects can be managed entirely within VPMi, or through Microsoft Project (MSP) integration allowing Project Managers to upload and sync Microsoft Project Plans. VPMi can also be used directly to manage workplans in the Workplan Gantt Editor, a browser-based graphical user interface (GUI). Once created, projects can be routed along a customizable Process Map. Additionally, VPMi has built in templating, allowing PMs to apply the settings and workplan information of a created project to new projects. Projects also have a status, which indicates its state with red, yellow or green. VPMi allows feedback to be requested from project team members. Finally, projects can be prioritized to show where resources are required.

=== Workplan Management ===
VPMi tracks three kinds of workplan items: Tasks, Deliverables, and Milestones. These items allow time tracking, and can also be tracked by client-defined phases or its percentage complete.

=== Log Item Tracking ===
VPMi tracks five types of logs: Action Items, Change Requests, Risks, Issues, and Support Logs. These logs allow time tracking, and can be used for projects, programs and reports.

=== Program Management ===
Projects can be associated with programs, which combine metrics of several projects into a bigger picture. Programs can track the log items above and financial metrics across projects. Programs also have a status, varying from red, yellow or green to show its state. VPMi allows feedback to be requested from program team members.

=== Reports ===
VPMi offers a large number of pre-built reports that generate metrics about items within VPMi, all of which can be exported to a Microsoft Office format (Excel or Word). In addition to these pre-built reports, VPMi offers the Ad Hoc Report Writer, allowing users to create reports using varied data sources. The User Documentation includes a tutorial on how to use the Ad Hoc Report Writer.

=== Time Tracking ===
VPMi allows users to track time to any item through assignments and time tracking. Time can be approved or rejected by specified users. Time periods can be locked to prevent additional time tracked. Users can be designated as delegates to enter or approve time for other users. Additionally, VPMi offers a wide variety of reporting based on this time entry data.

=== Financials and Forecasting ===
VPMi tracks a variety of financial indicators including labor costs, and offers three kinds of labor forecasting sources: workplan, team and resource plan. It separates labor and non-labor costs, then sorts each item into the following categories: actuals, planned, baselined and budgeted. Additionally, VPMi can track and forecast expenses for projects based on time entry data.

=== User Management ===
VPMi's user management tracks roles and skills for all users. Skills are rated on five levels to represent the degree of expertise. A large number of user attributes can be managed, such as email addresses, their organization, manager, start and end dates, and billing and cost rates.

=== Other Features ===
- Search Filters: Filter pages allow users to disseminate information by categories.
- Online Glossary: Extensive User Guide generated by HelpNDoc.
- Document Management: VPMi allows the attaching of various document types to items, allowing them to be downloaded by other users. It also offers a globally available set of documents called "Standards" linked through the top menu.
- Calendars: Sync projects with in-app calendar.

== See also ==
- Project management software
- List of project management software
- Project Portfolio Management
- Comparison of time tracking software
