= Certinia =

Cloud-based applications company

- Type: Private company
- Industry: Enterprise resource planning software
- Founded: 2009
- Headquarters: San Jose, California
- Key people: Donald Paoni (CEO)
- Parent: Haveli Investments
- Website: certinia.com

Certinia, known as FinancialForce.com, Inc. until 2023, is a software company headquartered in San Jose, California, that provides enterprise resource planning (ERP) software based on the Salesforce Platform. The ERP software includes accounting, billing, professional services automation, revenue recognition, human resource management, and supply chain management applications.

== History ==
CODA was a UK software company that was founded in 1979 and acquired by Unit4 Agresso in 2008. In 2009 FinancialForce was announced as a joint venture between Salesforce and Unit4 Agresso, operating as an independent company.. FinancialForce offered a platform of cloud-based accounting tools, and incorporated elements from CODA's "Coda 2go"

FinancialForce raised $110 million in investment in March 2015, led by Technology Crossover Ventures and Salesforce Ventures, following a $50 million round in 2014. In January 2017, Tod Nielsen, a former executive at Salesforce and Heroku, became CEO, succeeding Roche.

Logo of FinancialForce until May 2023

As of March 2019, 40% of the shares were owned by Salesforce and 60% by UNIT4. Het Financieele Dagblad estimated the value of the company at around 500 million euros, based on the 2019 annual report.

On May 3, 2023, the company FinancialForce.com Inc. was renamed to Certinia.

On July 26, 2023, an investment group led by private-equity firm Haveli Investments purchased Certinia for nearly $1 billion, including debt. In October 2023, Donald Paoni was named the new CEO, replacing Scott Brown.
