= Goalscape Visual Information Management Software =

Software that visualizes goals to align tasks and motivation

Goalscape Software GmbH
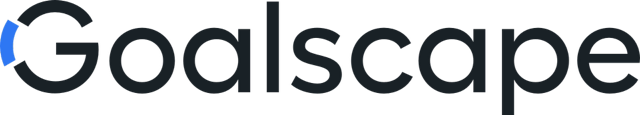
- Type: Private
- Industry: Project management; task management; productivity software; team collaboration
- Headquarters: Kiel, Schleswig-Holstein, Germany
- Key people: Marcus Baur (CEO)
- Website: goalscape.com

Goalscape Software GmbH is a commercially licensed visual information management software application. Initially used in Olympics, Goalscape has a patented user interface which displays the information hierarchy as a multi-level pie chart. The company was founded by Marcus Baur in 2009 in Kiel.

Goalscape is a cross-platform application that is delivered as a web application that runs on all major web browsers for online access and project collaboration.

The conceptual foundation of Goalscape's visual methodology originated in the field of high-performance and Olympic sports training.
