= Clarizen =

Clarizen, Inc.
- Type: Privately held
- Industry: Software
- Founded: 2005
- Headquarters: San Mateo, California
- Products: Project management software
- Website: clarizen.com

Clarizen, Inc. is a project management software and collaborative work management company.

Clarizen uses a software as a service business model. Clarizen's features include attaching CAD drawings to a project, moving between the project view and design view and an E-mail reporting feature.

In May 2014 Clarizen raised $35 million in venture capital investment led by Goldman Sachs. The round brought investment to $90 million. Previous investors, including Benchmark Capital, Carmel Ventures, DAG Ventures, Opus Capital and Vintage Investment Partners participated.

In April 2020, Clarizen appointed Matt Zilli as its new CEO, replacing Boaz Chalamish who is appointed as Executive Chairman.

In January 2021 Clarizen was acquired by Planview.

== See also ==
Comparison of time-tracking software
