= OmniPlan =

- Developer: The Omni Group
- Stable release: macOS: 4.10.1 (October 28, 2025; 5 months ago) [±]; iOS: 4.10.1 (October 28, 2025; 5 months ago) [±]
- Operating system: macOS, iOS
- Type: Project management software
- License: Commercial
- Website: omnigroup.com

OmniPlan is a planning and project management software product from The Omni Group, headquartered in Seattle, Washington. The software was released as a public beta on June 6, 2006.

In a June 2007 evaluation of OmniPlan 1.0, Macworld, a web site and monthly computer magazine dedicated to Apple Macintosh products, found the customizability of OmniPlan 1.0 to be "superior", but said the software was unlikely to meet the needs of project managers with multiple, complex projects.

Version 4 of OmniPlan was released on July 15 2020 and added interval tracking, recurring tasks, auto-hiding of completed tasks, changes to scheduling abilities, a project wizard to set up new projects in the app, updated outline and resource views, a flat-file save format (in addition to the current package-based format), and an optional dark-themed UI mode.

== Purpose ==
OmniPlan is used to manage multi-resource projects using Gantt Charts. The program acts as a dashboard, showing the status of each task and its relation to other tasks. Reports about work completed, total cost, and other metrics can be exported as well. Resources (which are either staff, equipment, or materials) can be assigned to tasks, which can be used to prevent resources from being over-utilized, and to account for time when that resource cannot work on the project in the main Gantt Chart view.

== macOS version ==
OmniPlan for Mac is released as a native Mac OS application. Two versions of the application are available at different price ranges. The standard version contains only local-editing features, whereas the pro version includes support for syncing OmniPlan documents with other users among other features.

== iOS version ==
In May 2012, OmniPlan was released for the iPad. With the release of Version 2.1 on March 12, 2015, OmniPlan became a universal app which runs on iPhone, iPad, and iPod touch devices.

The iOS version maintains general feature parity with the desktop version, save for scripting support and an outline view. Microsoft Project import is also only available as an additional in-app purchase.

== See also ==
- List of project management software
