= Genius Project =

Computer Software

- Developer: Genius Inside
- Release: 1997; 29 years ago
- Stable release: 8.2 / 2017; 9 years ago
- Available in: English, German, French
- Type: Project management software
- License: Proprietary EULA
- Website: https://cerri.com/project

Cerri Project, formerly known as Genius Project is a project portfolio management software (PPM).

== History ==
The Cerri Project, developed by Genius Inside, was initially released in 1997 and is available in English, German, Spanish, and French. It includes software as a service (SaaS) and on-premises deployment options, built on IBM middleware.

== See also ==
- Comparison of project management software
- Project management software
