= Sciforma =

Enterprise Project and Portfolio Management (PPM) software

- Developer: Sciforma
- Stable release: 7.1 / 2019
- Operating system: Cross-platform
- Type: Project management software
- License: Proprietary EULA
- Website: www.sciforma.com

Sciforma, previously named PSNext, is an enterprise Project and Portfolio Management (PPM) software developed by Sciforma Corporation. Sciforma Corporation is an American software company based in San Jose, California. It is a Java web based cross-platform solution. It provides integration of portfolio, project, resource and document management and is completely configurable. The current software version is Sciforma 7.1. This version adds Single sign-on and an HTML5 interface enabling access from mobile devices or thin clients.

It runs on a Tomcat, WAS, Weblogic or JBoss application server with a PostgreSQL, Microsoft SQL Server, DB2 or Oracle database.

Sciforma has offices in France, Germany, UK, Australia and Japan and distributors in several other countries. The software is available in 7 languages: English, French, German, Spanish, Japanese, Hebrew and Polish.

PSNext, first released in 2004, is the successor of Project Scheduler, developed by Sciforma since 1982.

Clients from different industries use Sciforma such as Societe de Transport de Montreal, Netgear, Boeing and Zodiac Aerospace.

== Features and Methodologies ==
Features of Sciforma include:

- Project Management
- Portfolio Management
- Resource Management
- Cost Management
- Risk Management
- Document Management
- Time Reporting
- Capacity Planning
- Demand Management
- Program Management
- Work Management

Some of the methodologies included in Sciforma are: PMBOK, CCPM, Agile, Phase-Gate and PRINCE2.

== Chronology of Versions ==
- January 2018 - Sciforma 7.1
- March 2015 - Sciforma 7.0
- September 2013 - Sciforma 6.0
- June 2012 - Sciforma 5.0
- September 2011 - Sciforma 4.0
- January 2009 - PSNext 3.0
- June 2006 - PSNext 2.0
- March 2004 - PSNext 1.0
