= Project KickStart =

Project KickStart Pro 5

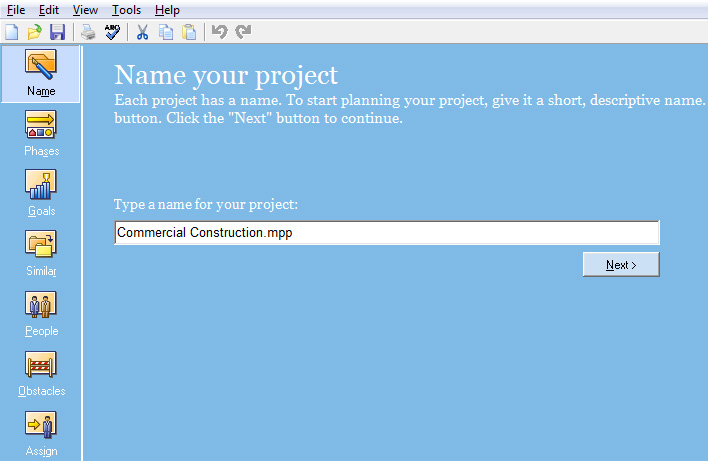
- Project KickStart Pro 5
- Developers: Experience in Software, Inc.
- Stable release: 5.0
- Operating system: Microsoft Windows
- Type: Project management software
- License: Commercial
- Website: http://www.projectkickstart.com/

Project KickStart is desktop project management software by Experience in Software, Inc. in Berkeley, California. The program uses a wizard-like interface for project planning.

== History ==
The original Project KickStart for DOS was released in 1992. The product far outsold Experience in Software's other titles, and in 1995 Project KickStart for Windows was released. Versions 2, 3, 4 and 5 (all for Windows) followed. Since 2008, the company sells Project KickStart Standard 5 and Project KickStart Pro 5.

== Software ==
Project KickStart's wizard prompts users to identify phases, goals, obstacles and personnel assignments for projects and uses a calendar to produce a Gantt chart that features the project's phases and the goals, tasks and assignments for each.

KickStart's project files can be exported into Microsoft's Project, Outlook, Word, Excel or PowerPoint, as well as ACT!, Milestones Professional, MindManager and WBS Chart.
