= Huddle (software) =

Information

- Type: Private
- Industry: Collaborative software, content management
- Founded: 2006
- Headquarters: London, United Kingdom; San Francisco, California
- Products: Huddle
- Website: www.huddle.com

Huddle is a privately held cloud-based collaboration software company founded in London in 2006 by Alastair Mitchell and Andy McLoughlin. The company is co-headquartered in London and San Francisco with additional offices in Washington D.C., and New York City.

== History ==
As of 2012, the company had raised approximately $40 million in three funding rounds from Jafco Ventures, Eden Ventures, Matrix Partners and angel investors.

On September 12, 2013, Huddle announced its desktop integrations with Huddle for Mac, Huddle for Windows and Huddle for Outlook. The launch of Huddle Note followed in December 2013, enabling simple content creation in the cloud, along with a redesigned iOS app. The Huddle for Office integration launched the following year.

In 2014, Huddle announced that it had secured a global enterprise-wide agreement with Grant Thornton, which will make the secure cloud collaboration technology available to member firms across the globe. In addition, Williams Lea, the global business process outsourcing (BPO) company, signed an enterprise-wide agreement with Huddle, adding it to its suite of online tools to further increase the speed at which it collaborates internally and externally.

In August 2017, Huddle was acquired by Turn/River Capital, a San Francisco–based private equity firm.

== Users of Huddle ==
Huddle is used by the Department of Energy & Climate Change and the charity Barnardo's.

=== Huddle usage in government ===
Huddle is used by 80% of central UK government departments, including the Ministry of Justice (MoJ), Department of Environment, Food and Rural Affairs (DEFRA), the Department of Energy and Climate Change and the Department for Business Innovation and Skills (BIS). As of the end of August 2014, Huddle had secured 206 contracts via the G-Cloud framework.

On September 12, 2012, Huddle announced that a FISMA-certified instance of its cloud-based content collaboration platform is being developed for U.S. government agencies and organizations as a result of a strategic partnership and technology development agreement with In-Q-Tel, the non-profit, strategic investment firm that identifies innovative technology solutions to support the missions of the U.S. Intelligence Community. This instance of the cloud collaboration services enables the U.S. government community to securely discover, access and work on content with people. The technology was used via pilots, which have since ended, for two IQT customer agencies, the Department of Homeland Security Science and Technology Directorate and the National Geospatial-Intelligence Agency.

== Awards ==
In 2013, the company received the award for “Emerging Star of the Year” at the UK Tech Awards 2013 and the "Supplier of the Year" accolade at Computer Weekly's European User Awards for Enterprise Software. The company's CEO Alastair Mitchell has been selected as one of Computer Weekly's “Ten Rising Stars” at the publication's CW Tech 50 Awards.
