= LibrePlan =

Software web application

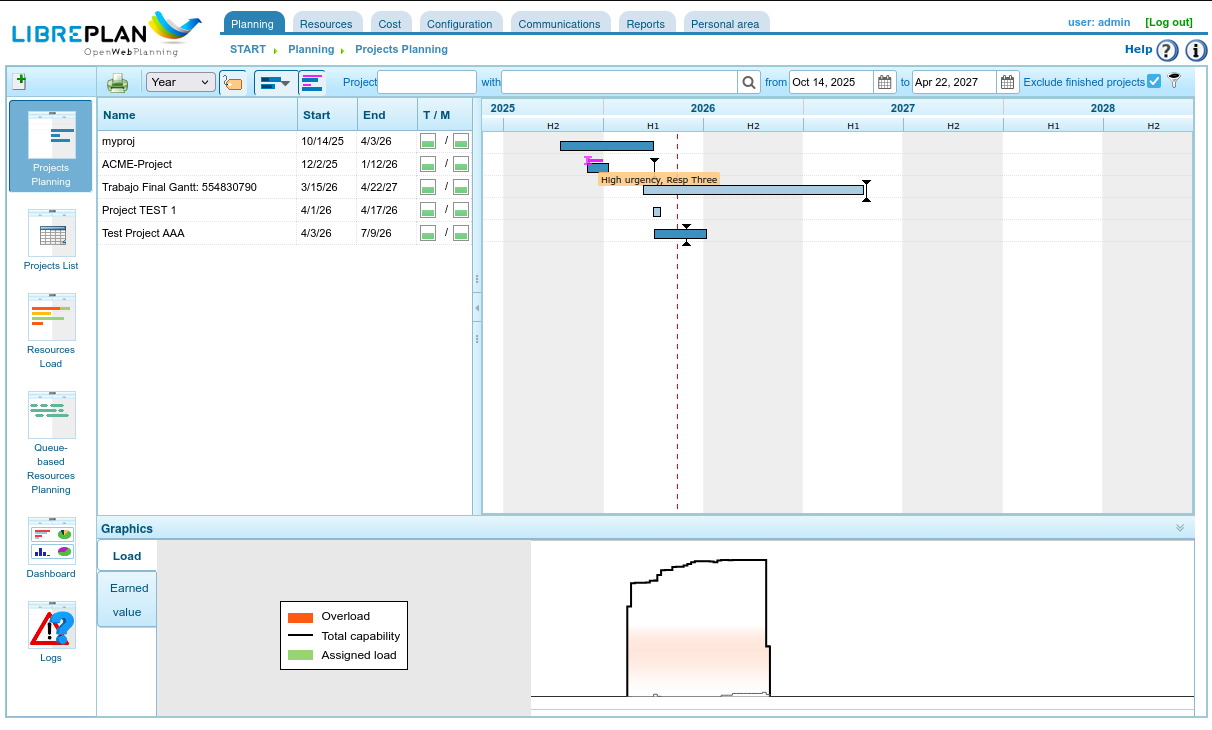
- LibrePlan 1.6.0 main screen
- Developer: The LibrePlan community
- Stable release: 1.6.0 / May 12, 2026; 6 days ago
- Written in: Java
- Operating system: Cross-platform
- Available in: Catalan, Chinese, Czech, English, Galician, German, French, Italian, Dutch, Polish, Portuguese, Norwegian Bokmal, Ukrainian, Iranian, Russian and Spanish
- Type: Project management software
- License: AGPL-3.0
- Website: www.libreplan.dev
- Repository: github.com/LibrePlan/libreplan

LibrePlan is a free software web application for project management, developed by the LibrePlan community. The headquarters are located in Dun-sur-Grandry, France.

LibrePlan was formerly known as NavalPlan. It was created "to improve management of the production of the companies of the Galician naval auxiliary sector". LibrePlan is designed to respond to needs of these companies and organizational complexity and integration with production processes in the naval sector. However, it is of much more general applicability.

It is written in Java and licensed under Affero General Public License.

== Computer system solutions to planning problems ==
Within the overall framework of LibrePlan and the management of the planning, Igalia developed a project to solve a number of common problems of planning, co-funded by the Xunta de Galicia, the Ministry of industry, tourism and trade, and by the European Union (ERDF). Likewise, the project was part of the Avanza Plan (plan for improved knowledge society) of the Spanish government.

In 2014, ownership of the project was transferred to a new project leader, Jeroen Baten. he has been running the project ever since.

== Features ==
LibrePlan is a tool that allows you to plan, monitor, control and organize the tasks and projects of an organization. Within each group of processes, LibrePlan provides functionality in three areas: planning, monitoring and control.

=== Planning ===
At the level of planning, LibrePlan offers the following features:

- Multi-project management. It offers an overview of the company with the ability to view all the projects that share resources from a same organization.
- Allocation of resources, with support for multiple allocation by linear interpolation polynomial functions. You can create dynamic groups based on criteria. The criteria are entities of the system that allow to classify resources (both human and machine) and tasks. And there are 2 types of allocation: generic and specific. The generic is an allocation based on criteria for a task, and that they must be satisfied by the resources they have ability to do it. The specific allocation is to assign a resource to a specific task.
- Flexible calendars/schedules, with the possibility of choice between several strategies for resource allocation: calculation of hours, resources per day or end based on variable date calculations.
- Selection of points of planning from the elements that make up an order. An order (or project) is formed by a tree of elements of indefinite depth level. The tree can be carried planning in the nodes that you want the user in such a way that will manage the planning at desired levels of tree.
- Task based on the training of resources allocation.
- Specific management of queues for limiting resources.
- Project issues and risk management

=== Monitoring ===
At the level of monitoring, LibrePlan offers:

- Support for introduction of parts of an hour of work on the tasks of the project, which allows to monitor the time invested.
- It allows the introduction of types of progress on tasks, allowing the monitoring of the status of the projects.
- Two possible views: global view company (or multiple projects) summary of detours and delays in the overall view of the company, and project view. The global view can view orders and check the State of the same, and manage them, as well as view the general charge of the company's resources. View of project displays planning, resource load, advanced resource allocation and the edition of the selected order, because LibrePlan offers graphics in use of resources.
- Configurable Gantt chart from Work Breakdown Structure (WBS).
- Resource Breakdown Structure (RBS) chart.
- E-mail notification features with frequency scheduling through the built-in job scheduler.

=== Control ===
To control the situation, LibrePlan has the following features:

- Cost analysis and control of tasks based on work reports.
- Global management: manage all global mode for an organization or company information, a control that supports the strategic decision-making on the productive capacity of the company can be.
- Reports: Generation of reports of results.
- Indicators of control of projects such as the overhead resource allocation control, Earned Value Management or control of material requirements.
- Management of labels and label for extraction of filtered information types. Given that the system has a range of elements labeled or marked tasks and resources, you can use filtering criteria or tags, which allows access to categorized information or extract specific reports based on criteria or tags.
- Calendars: they determine the available productive hours of different resources. The user can create general calendar of the company and get features to perform more specific timetables, reaching as far as level of calendar by task or resource.
- Order and elements of order: jobs requested by clients in LibrePlan are in the form of order, structured in elements of order. The order with its elements form a hierarchical structure in n levels. This tree of elements is about which one works at the time of planning a work/job.
- Progress: allows you to manage various types of progress. A project can be measured as a percentage (%) of progress, however, it's also measured in units, agreed budget, etc. The person who manages the planning is responsible for deciding that type of advance is used to compare progress to senior levels of project.
- Parts: they are documents of the workers of companies that indicate the hours worked and the tasks assigned to the hours of work for each worker. With this information, the system is able to calculate how many hours consumed a task with respect to the total number of budgeted hours, allowing to compare the progress made with regard to the real consumption of hours.

=== Other functions ===
In addition to the above, cade highlight other features that distinguish the similar applications programme:

- Integration with other LibrePlan instances and third-party ERP software: LibrePlan will import information directly of the ERP programmes of companies for orders, human resources, working parties and certain criteria.
- Management of versions: the application will allow the management of various versions of planning and at the same time check the information of each one of them.
- Management of historic: LibrePlan does not delete information, only invalid, so it is possible to consult through filtering by data and old information.
- Importation of issues from JIRA.
- Other functionalities: Materials, quality forms, project templates, planning scenarios, multiple task progress measurement ...

Since LibrePlan contains 'naval' references in its name, it is important to stress that it is a general web application useful for any organization/person who wants to plan several projects and resources.

== See also ==
- Microsoft Project
- OpenProj
- OpenProject
