= IRise =

Software company based in California

iRise
- Industry: software
- Founded: 1996
- Founder: Maurice Martin; Emmet B. Keeffe III
- Headquarters: El Segundo, California

iRise is a software company based in El Segundo, California. It provides a cloud-based requirements definition and visualization platform for teams and businesses. iRise allows product owners, product managers, business analysts and other stakeholders to prototype new products, features, and enhancements without any code or scripting. iRise also supports creating interactive business process flows, use cases, and other diagrams. Each screen, UI element, and diagram can be annotated with detailed requirements that can be exported into custom documentation.

== History ==
Company was founded in 1996 by Maurice Martin under the name of Intrasolv Consulting. Co-Founder Emmet B. Keeffe III joined in 1998. Originally a technology consulting services firm focused on building Java-based applications for Fortune 1000 companies, the company changed its name to iRise in 2002. The company has secured $50 million in investment funding from investors, including Morgan Stanley and Deutsche Bank. iRise currently holds 4 U.S. patents on its simulation technology.

== Product ==
iRise is a requirements definition and software prototyping platform used to create simulations of business software. It allows business analysts, product managers, project managers and usability professionals to assemble fully functional simulations of software solutions that mimic the exact look, feel, and behavior of the proposed final product. Business stakeholders, end users and development teams can interact with the simulation and conduct near-final usability testing prior to the start of coding. The visual allows users to get the desired features, functionality, look and feel before development. Web applications, commercial off-the-shelf systems like SAP and Oracle, desktop systems, and mobile apps can be simulated.

The iRise platform is available both as a SaaS or on-premises service. Teams from around the globe can collaborate in real-time on interactive prototypes, annotate them with requirements, securely share them, collect feedback, generate documentation, and export code to jumpstart development, all within the browser. Authors use a drag-and-drop paradigm to lay out scenarios, screens, widgets, data interactions, business logic and behavior. Masters and templates are supported that become reusable definition assets, and text requirements can be noted in context to the scenarios and screens of the simulation.

Users can add additional fidelity with iRise Studio, the desktop companion application for adding complex behaviors, business logic, and data operations. iRise Studio, allows users to transform simple prototypes into realistic simulations that stakeholders can actually use and test, again without a line of code. Using the iBloc Application Programming Interface (API), users can create their own custom UI elements and actions or import existing JavaScript-based components available on the Internet.

Multiple simulation authors can work on the same project at the same time, and authors can publish a simulation for review by directing reviewers to a URL. Reviewers login to view and interact with simulations and provide feedback. Authors can also share their projects with anyone as a simple exported iDoc file. Using the free iRise Reader app, stakeholders can run iRise projects and add comments.

A July 2015 partnership with Tasktop Inc. lets iRise connect, via a Tasktop Sync connector, to leading ALM tools, including Atlassian JIRA, HP Quality Center, IBM Rational, Microsoft TFS, Jama, VersionOne, ThoughtWorks Mingle, and Blueprint.
