= HyperOffice =

Online collaboration and conferencing company

- Developer: HyperOffice
- Operating system: Cross-platform
- Type: Collaborative software
- Website: www.hyperoffice.com

HyperOffice is a privately held American corporation based in Rockville, Maryland. Founded in 1999, it offers web collaboration, online meeting, web conferencing, online database and email marketing applications to small and mid-sized companies, particularly healthcare, public-sector, and education. Its flagship product is the HyperOffice Collaboration Suite, whose integrated tools include business email, mobile mail, document collaboration, intranet/extranet publishing, contact management, calendaring, task management, forums, and other applications.

The company was founded during the dot-com bubble of 1998–2000. It eventually changed its name to WebOS and focused on developing a web-based operating system instead of collaboration products. In 2002, the company re-opened its doors as HyperOffice with a renewed focus on collaboration products.

== History ==
HyperOffice was founded in 1999 by Drew Morris and Shervin Pishevar. The lead angel investor was Strategic Technology Investors, co-managed by Roy Morris and Steve Zecola, two former telecom executives. It was one of the earliest incarnations of hosted groupware, along with sites such as Jump.com (bought by Microsoft), When.com (bought by AOL), and Hotoffice (which failed but was restarted). It was amongst the early few companies to offer software-as-a-service (SaaS), a popular and emergent approach to application deployment today. Also, its later incarnation, WebOS, had a contribution in the emergence of the Ajax web-programming techniques.

The product was originally launched as a free service targeted at individuals and small businesses. It enjoyed modest success and was soon funded by a group of private investors.

=== WebOS ===
While HyperOffice was building out its collaboration functions, a young Swedish programmer, Fredrik Malmer, released a web site known as webos.org to demonstrate the power of a web-based desktop. The site was immediately heralded for its innovative use of JavaScript and DHTML. Within months of its release, Malmer was contacted by HyperOffice and joined the company. Shortly afterwards the company changed its name to myWebOS.com, a year later it became WebOS.com.

Within a few months Daniel Steinman, Erik Arviddson, Emil A Eklund and Eric Pearson joined the team. Each of these developers went on to be prominent members of the web development community. The company then began work on the WebOS API, a predecessor of the now-ubiquitous Ajax.

The WebOS API served as one of the earliest JavaScript event/object models that was overlaid on the browser. It formalized a process for asynchronous communication through the use of Iframes or Layers (depending on the browser). Perhaps more importantly, the WebOS API marked the first time a collection of JavaScript libraries were managed by a single central "kernel" and loaded on demand whenever a dependent object was instantiated, a practice common in compiled languages. This was a step forward in the history of rich Internet applications as it formalized a process that is now used in almost all of the modern Ajax frameworks.

Although the WebOS API's were published briefly, they were published as the company was going through a dissolution process. They were largely ignored by the developer community because of the company's lack of support for them.

=== Rebirth ===
Although the company had changed its name multiple times to focus on the WebOS portion of its business, the core functionality of its products had always rested in its collaboration technologies. After the dotcom bubble burst in 2001, the HyperOffice service was maintained by its founders for over a year. In 2002 the company began development anew under its old name, HyperOffice, and re-dedicated its efforts to provide a collaboration suite (this time as a paid service).

HyperOffice has continued to operate on the online collaboration market since then, serving around 300,000 customers worldwide since its re-establishment. HyperOffice won the Computerworld Horizon Awards in 2006, and also the Small Business Technology Magazine "Product To Watch Award" the same year.

== Products ==
HyperOffice positions itself as an alternative to Microsoft Sharepoint and Exchange for messaging and collaboration for small to mid-sized businesses. The HyperOffice suite includes.

- Email Service
- Webmail
- Outlook Integration
- Intranet/Extranet Publisher
- Calendaring
- Contact Management
- Task Management
- Forums
- Polling
- IM
- Time and Expense Application
- Universal Login

It includes two plugins: HyperShare, which allows HyperOffice users to integrate and synchronize with Outlook; and HyperDrive, which allows files in HyperOffice's online folders to be managed from the desktop.

In 2008, HyperOffice launched new products to add to its line of online productivity tools. HyperCampaign is an online tool for automated email marketing campaigns.
