= Spider Project =

Project management software

- Screenshot of the Spider Project Professional demo version, showing the demo construction project
- Website: www.spiderproject.ru

Spider Project is a project management software, developed by a company, called Spider Project Team.

== Introduction ==
Spider Project is primarily a tool for project and portfolio scheduling and associated resource, materials, cost and risk management. It does not have features like project-related communication management, issue tracking, and document management.

According to Spider Project's publisher, the product provides CPM functions and metrics, and can calculate critical path drag, which tells the user how much each critical path activity delays project completion. Spider provides automatic scheduling, driven by resource allocation and resource leveling, and does not stress manual scheduling features.

Spider Project's publisher says it is closely linked with "Success Driven Project Management (SDPM)" —a methodology, developed by Spider Project Team, which describes how scheduling-related project management is done. Other project management software tools can use SDPM methods by adjusting the method to match that tool's functions.

Spider Project Team promotes project management in general, as well as PMBOK Guide specifically in Russia. General director of Spider Project Team Vladimir Liberzon is a vice president of the PMI Moscow, Russia Project Management Institute Chapter. Spider Project Team is a PMI Registered Education Provider.

Members of Spider Project team have spoken at several PMI and International Project Management Association (IPMA) Congresses and Conferences.

== Historical roots ==
Spider Project began in the Soviet Union. The Soviet economy was characterized by several factors:

- It was a centrally planned economy. As a consequence planning methods and techniques, and their mathematical background were subjects of high importance. In 1963, a Central Economic Mathematical Institute was founded with the main goal of "introduction of the mathematical methods and computers in the practice of planning, creation of the theory of the optimal control of the national economy. "
- In the Cold War, the Soviet Union had to compete with much more economically powerful and resource-rich western countries. This required efficient use of available resources. In 1975, Soviet mathematician and economist Leonid Kantorovich won a Nobel Prize in Economics for his work on the optimal allocation of scarce resources.

Spider Project Team claims that Spider inherited some of those planning methods developed in the Soviet Union. As an example, they say it is distinct from similar project management tools because of its resource planning and levelling algorithms and related features that target optimizing constrained resources, materials, and finances.

== Notable features ==
=== Resource Leveling ===
Resource leveling is emphasized in most of the publication about Spider Project. Though no academic-level report is available with comparison of the resource leveling algorithms of different project management tools, Spider Project has shown the best results among other tools compared in limited tests conducted by members of the professional Planning Planet forum (tests were conducted based on library of Resource-Constrained Project Scheduling Problems (RCPSP), made available by the Technical University of Munich).

=== Resource Productivity ===
Spider supports activities with type "productivity". When specific activity is marked to be a productivity type, user needs to specify productivities of resources, assigned to this activity. Duration on such activity will then be calculated by Spider and will depend on the combined productivity of resources, assigned to this activity.

=== Skill scheduling ===
In addition to conventional assignment of resources to activities, Spider supports assignment of resource Skills. In this situation user has to create table with relation between resources and skills. One resource can have one or more skills, equally every skill, can have one or more resources assigned to them. During project scheduling Spider automatically selects the actual resource, which will be assigned to activity. The decision which resource to assigned will be based on resource skills, productivities, costs and user defined priorities.

=== Variable Resource Assignment ===
In addition to conventional assignment of resources, when user specifies a fixed amount of resources assigned to a specific activity (e.g. Brick Layer [500%]), Spider supports situation, when user specifies a range (minimum and maximum amount of resources) required for activity. In this situation activity will be ongoing if minimum amount of resources is available, and if and when more resources become available, they will also be assigned to this activity.

== Market share and geography ==
No independent data Spider Project's market share exists. Spider Project team claims Spider Project is used in 37 countries, and believe Russia and Ukraine have the most installations.

Having its head office in Moscow, Russia, as well as several representatives in Russia, Spider Project Team has also partners in the following countries:

- Belarus
- Kazakhstan
- Brazil
- Malayzia
- Romania
- Ukraine
- USA
- Australia

The largest projects known to have used Spider Project are:

- A portfolio of construction projects for the 2014 Winter Olympic Games in Sochi
- A portfolio of construction projects for APEC Russia 2012 summit
- Spider Project site has a document, reportedly published together with Romtelecom, Romania at PMICOS conference, where a detailed report is provided on usage of Spider Project for managing of a portfolio of 1,600 projects, containing up to 170,000 activities.

== Software releases ==
Between 2007 and 2013 Spider Project released an average of 1.8 releases per month.

== Architecture ==
Though used for multi-user portfolio management, Spider does not have a server. It manages portfolios using the same software that manages individual projects. It does this with a distributed architecture, through software features and organisational procedures. This includes:

- Consolidating individual projects over a computer network into a portfolio, followed by redistributing projects, in case information in them has changed. This procedure must be executed regularly, following a schedule update cycle.
- Keeping information in "Corporate Reference Books, " which must be identical for all projects of the portfolio (e.g., resource information, resource calendars etc.). Corporate Reference Books should be protected by file system access control. If Corporate Reference Books are updated, those working on individual projects must synchronize them with their schedules (e.g., to use new resources, etc.).

== Language support ==
Spider Project is available in English, Russian, Romanian and Portuguese and Spanish.

== Software versions ==
Spider project is available in four versions, which differ in functionality and price:

- Professional
- Desktop Plus
- Desktop Lite
- Lite

The Professional and Lite versions are also available in demo versions. The demo versions provide most program features and have no expiration time, but have a limit of 40 activities (though any number of project phases).

A Spider Project licence lets users access and distribute to any number of other users a Spider Project Viewer. Spider Project Viewer can open and analyse Spider Project files and generate reports, but not modify the project file.
