= Freedcamp =

Project management software

Freedcamp, Inc.
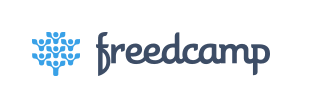
- Company type: Private
- Industry: Project management, task management, productivity software, team collaboration
- Founded: 2010
- Founder: Angel Grablev
- Headquarters: Santa Barbara, California, United States
- Website: www.freedcamp.com

Freedcamp is a web, mobile and desktop project management and collaboration platform for teams. The idea for Freedcamp was developed in 2009, and the service was launched in 2010 in Santa Barbara, California by founder Angel Grablev.

Freedcamp provides a cloud-based project management system with a free tier that supports an unlimited number of users, files and projects. All users have access to a number of essential applications to manage projects and a variety of additional tools that can be purchased as part of paid plans. The free offering allows users to assign tasks, set milestones, schedule events on a calendar, use discussion boards and track time spent on tasks.

Freedcamp is often noted as a free alternative to Basecamp in part because of the similarity in name, although the vision and business model differ.

== Features ==
Free applications:

- Tasks – Shared task lists with subtasks
- Team Collaboration – Invite team members, communicate and share the workload
- Discussions – Forum boards
- File Storage – File and document management
- Milestones – Deadline setting
- Calendar – Event scheduling
- Time – Time tracking
- Password Manager – Secure password storage
- Tasky – Private task list

Paid applications:

- CRM – Customer relationship management
- Issue Tracker – Advanced workflow and issue management
- Invoices – Client billing with invoices
- Wiki – Internal or public documentation
- Gantt Charts – Visual timelines showing when tasks start and end in relation to other tasks
- Google Drive – Sync Freedcamp with Google Drive
- Dropbox – Integrate Dropbox files inside Freedcamp
- OneDrive – Access OneDrive files
- Custom Fields – Custom fields stored within tasks or projects

== Access modes and notifications ==
Freedcamp supports multiple user roles with different access levels within a project. Administrators can set up general users and assign tasks with varying levels of restriction where necessary. A client or guest role can be used to provide limited, read focused access. Users can tag participants in posts so they receive project updates by email.

== Payment ==
Freedcamp offers unlimited storage on its free plan, with limits applied only to the size of individual uploaded files. The free plan currently allows files up to 10 MB in size. The developers have stated that they intend to keep the basic package free and available to all users.

Paid plans are offered in several tiers (Lite, Business and Enterprise), each bundling additional applications and increasing per file storage limits. Paid features are primarily targeted at business use cases and do not restrict the use of the free system for personal or everyday projects. Since November 2017, Freedcamp has used an adaptive pricing model influenced by the approach popularized by Slack (software).

== API & integrations ==
In July 2018, Freedcamp released its API to third party developers and launched a Zapier integration. Freedcamp’s open API allows external applications to read information from Freedcamp, create or update items and automate workflows within the system. This enables customers or third party developers to build on the Freedcamp platform and adapt it to their own processes. Common use cases include automating repetitive tasks, connecting multi step processes, automating reporting on tasks and projects, and syncing with databases or other tools.

The Freedcamp API is a RESTful interface that uses predictable URLs for accessing resources and standard HTTP methods for requests and responses. This allows it to work with a wide range of environments, from command line utilities and browser extensions to native applications.

Freedcamp has integrations with other SaaS tools, including Google Calendar, Dropbox, OneDrive, Google Drive and Zapier. In 2020 a Gmail add in and an Outlook add in were released.

== Uses ==
Founder Angel Grablev has stated that the potential uses for Freedcamp are broad, ranging from business projects to personal and educational use. Freedcamp has been used in classrooms at universities by both students and teachers, as well as by friends and families organizing trips and personal projects. The American Red Cross and the Make A Wish Foundation have also been reported as using Freedcamp for project work.

== Growth ==
In an interview with Founders Grid in August 2014, Grablev stated that Freedcamp had reached 330,000 users. An infographic produced in October 2014 indicated that the number of users had passed 396,000. According to the company, the system later reached 2 million users after a series of product releases described as major innovations for the project management market.
