= ProjectManager.com =

ProjectManager
- Developers: ProjectManager.com, Inc.
- Release: November 17, 2008
- Type: Project management, collaboration
- License: Proprietary
- Website: www.projectmanager.com

ProjectManager is an online project and portfolio management software which is a scalable software as a service (SaaS) for business managers and teams. The software is developed by ProjectManager.com, Inc. in Austin, TX.

ProjectManager provides a customizable online dashboard for keeping track of projects, team collaboration, as well as a task manager for creating project plans. Features include advanced scheduling, automated cost and time tracking, risk analysis and resource management.

The company was founded in New Zealand in 2008 by CEO Jason Westland. In 2014, Westland moved to the United States and opened a small office in Austin, TX. In 2018, ProjectManager announced that they had officially moved their headquarters to Austin, with most of their staff working in the newly expanded Austin office while development teams continue to work in New Zealand.

The company's success was aided by their push on social media, as highlighted in Forbes magazine.

ProjectManager won a Project Management Institute (PMI) award in July 2009. The company also received two awards from Deloitte as well as the 2013 Asia Pacific Fast 500 award. In 2019, ProjectManager's rapid growth landed the company on the Inc. 5000 list of fastest growing companies in the United States, as well as the Fast50 list of fastest growing companies in Austin, TX.

ProjectManager's clients include the United Nations, the US military, Boeing, NASA and Volvo. Today, the software has over 35,000 users.

ProjectManager has been reviewed in several publications including; Computerworld Magazine CRN Magazine PM Network Magazine Projects at Work Unlimited Magazine

== See also ==
- Project management software
- Collaborative software
