= Priority Matrix =

Time management software application

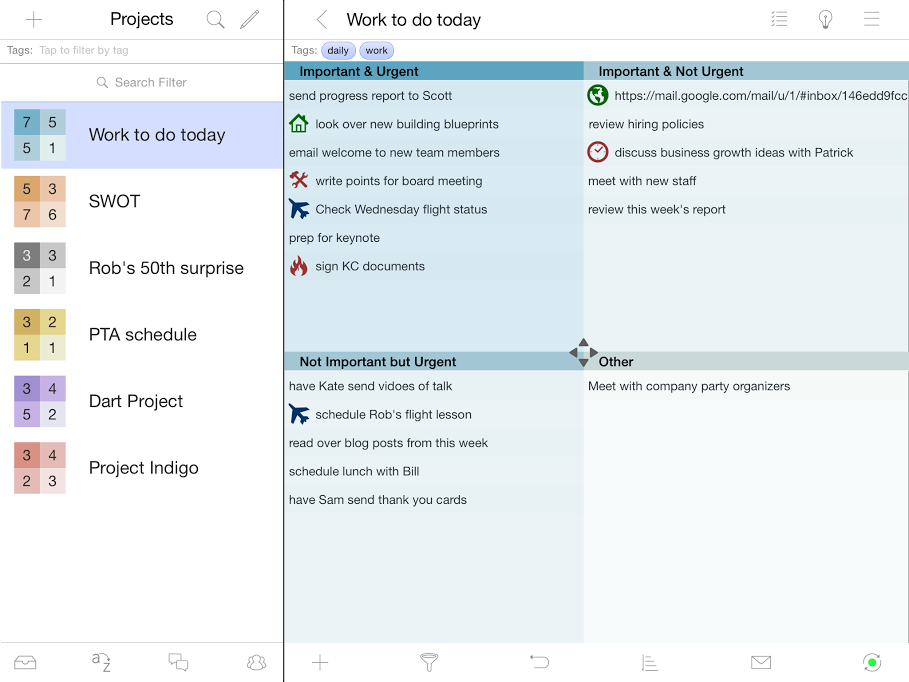
- Screenshot of Priority Matrix for iPad
- Developer: Appfluence Inc
- Stable release: 2.2.20150401 / November 1, 2020; 5 years ago
- Operating system: Windows, macOS, iOS, Android
- Type: Time management software
- License: Proprietary
- Website: appfluence.com

Priority Matrix is a time management software application based on the Eisenhower Method of arranging tasks by urgency and importance in a 2x2 matrix; although attributed to Dwight D. Eisenhower based on his Address to the Second Assembly of the World Council of Churches in Evanston, Illinois, the now-eponymous statement was delivered as a quote from sitting president of Northwestern University J. Roscoe Miller, then in attendance.

Now, my friends of this convocation, there is another thing we can hope to learn from your being with us. I illustrate it by quoting the statement of a former college president, and I can understand the reason for his speaking as he did. I am sure President Miller can.

This President said, “I have two kinds of problems, the urgent and the important. The urgent are not important, and the important are never urgent.”

Now this, I think, represents a dilemma of modern man. You’re being here can help place the important before us, and perhaps even give the important the touch of urgency[…] [emphasis added] — President Dwight D. Eisenhower, Address at the Second Assembly of the World Council of Churches, Evanston, Illinois, August 19, 1954

The application is also loosely based on David Allen's Getting Things Done methodology for improving productivity.

== Matrix Classification ==
The four quadrants of the Priority Matrix organize tasks, based on importance and urgency, into lists that are either

1. Both Urgent and Important
2. Urgent but not Important
3. Important but not Urgent
4. Neither Important nor Urgent

== Reception ==
PC Magazine ranked the iPad version of Priority Matrix among its 100 Best iPad Apps in 2011, 2012, and 2013.
