= Planisware =

Project management software company

- Type: Public
- Traded as: Euronext Paris: PLNW
- ISIN: FR001400PFU4
- Industry: Information technology
- Founded: 1996; 30 years ago
- Founder: Pierre Demonsant; Yves Humblot; Matthieu Delille; François Pelissolo
- Headquarters: Châtillon, Île-de-France, France
- Area served: Worldwide
- Key people: Pierre Demonsant (Chairman); Loïc Sautour (CEO)
- Products: Planisware Enterprise; Planisware Horizon; Planisware Nova; Planisware Orchestra
- Revenue: ▲€198.0 million (FY2025)
- Operating income: ▲€60.8 million (FY2025)
- Net income: ▲€50.0 million (FY2025)
- Number of employees: 838 (31 December 2025)
- Website: https://planisware.com/

Planisware is a publicly traded company that develops and provides project portfolio management (PPM) cloud software applications, a type of enterprise software. Planisware applications are used in multiple countries in industries such as energy, medical devices, high tech, aerospace and defense, chemicals, government, consumer goods, pharmaceutical, and automotive. The company was founded in 1996 in France. As of its initial public offering in 2024, it had 500 clients, including PepsiCo and Pfizer, and 700 employees.

== History ==
Planisware was founded in 1996 by Matthieu Delille, Pierre Demonsant, Yves Humblot, and François Pelissolo. The founding team was from Thales Group, a French aerospace and defence corporation.

Around May 2023 Planisware started working with investment bankers to explore a potential initial public offering (IPO). At that time, the private equity group Ardian held a stake in the company. In October 2023, Planisware announced plans for an IPO on Euronext Paris at a valuation of between 1.11 billion and 1.25 billion euros, then decided to postpone the IPO due to a "deteriorated" market environment. The IPO launched in April 2024 at a valuation of 1.11 billion euros. The founders retained a majority stake in the company. In September 2024, Ardian announced plans to sell their remaining shares in the company.

== See also ==
- List of project management software
