= Streamtime Software =

Streamtime
- Formerly: Particle Systems Limited
- Type: Privately held company
- Founded: 2002; 24 years ago
- Founder: Aaron Green
- Products: Streamtime
- Services: Web applications
- Owner: Software Combined Group Ltd
- Website: www.streamtime.net

Streamtime Software is a web-based project management tool, first launched in 2002 under the company name Particle Systems Limited and later renamed to Streamtime. Streamtime was owned and run by the founder Aaron Green from 2002 to 2022 and is currently owned by Software Combined Group Ltd.

Originally developed for the FileMaker platform and called 'Studio Assist', the product has progressed through multiple iterations with a fully web-based version of Streamtime released in April 2016. Founded in Christchurch, New Zealand, there are offices in Australia and the United Kingdom.

== Versions ==
- Studio Assist, launched in 2002
- Streamline Studio Assist, launched in 2003
- Streamline, released in 2004
- Streamtime Classic, was released in 2007
- Streamtime, launched in April 2016

== Awards ==
- 2007
  - ANZ Canterbury Export Awards – Emerging Exporter of the Year (Solid Energy category)
  - Deloitte/Unlimited Fast 50 – Ranked 26th (261% growth)
  - Deloitte Asia Pacific Fast 500 – Ranked 190th
  - Canterbury regional award – Fastest Growing Technology Business (NZ)
- 2008
  - Deloitte Fast 50 (NZ) – 8th fastest growing company (400%+ growth)
  - Deloitte Asia Pacific Fast 500 – Ranked 127th
  - FileMaker – Excellence Award
  - FileMaker – Business Driver Award (Asia Pacific)
- 2009
  - Deloitte Asia Pacific Technology Fast 500 – Third consecutive year ranking
- 2016
  - Best Design Awards (by the Designers Institute of New Zealand) – Silver in Application, Website, and Brand categories
  - Pinnacle Award – Identity & Branding (Large Business)
  - Sydney Design Awards – Gold in Digital - Business Operations
- 2017
  - D&AD Professional Award – Branding (Medium Organisation)
  - Webby Awards – Winner, Web Services & Applications
  - Capterra:
    - Most Recommended Project Management Tool for Creatives
    - Best Support
    - Best Value
  - AGDA Distinction Awards:
    - Design Effectiveness
    - Brand Expression in Moving Image
- 2018
  - Best Design Awards (by the Designers Institute of New Zealand):
    - Silver – Large Scale Website
    - Bronze – Interactive
    - Bronze – Design Craft
  - AGDA Distinction Award – Design Crafts
- 2019
  - Webby Awards – Nominee, Web Services & Applications
  - W3 Awards – Best in Show, Web Applications/Services
- 2020
  - Webby Awards – People's Choice Winner, Web Services & Applications

== See also ==
- Project management software
- Project management
- Web 2.0
