= RationalPlan =

Project management software

Stand By Soft SRL
- Type: Privately Held
- Industry: Software solutions
- Founded: 1997
- Headquarters: Craiova, Dolj, Romania
- Products: Desktop applications
- Website: Stand By Soft SRL

RationalPlan is a project management software suite for planning, managing, and tracking projects. The suite is developed by Stand By Soft, a Romanian developer that specializes in desktop applications, developed the software. RationalPlan runs on multiple platforms including Mac OS X, Windows, and Linux.

== History ==
RationalPlan was released in 2007 for Linux and Windows. The suite was released for Mac OS X in 2008.

In July 2012, Stand By Soft released RationalPlan 4.0, a major version upgrade. RationalPlan 4.1 was released in October 2012. RationalPlan earned third place in software solutions at Capterra’s Project Management Election in 2012.

== Product ==
RationalPlan consists of a project guide with three main parts; labeled Project, Planning, and Controlling, each consisting of several subcategories. The project section covers basic information and scheduling, the planning section defines resources and materials, and the controlling section allows users to update and track tasks. The RationalPlan suite includes RationalPlan Single, RationalPlan Multi, RationalPlan Viewer, and RationalPlan Server. Combined, the RationalPlan suite provides management help for single projects, multiple projects, project viewing, and a centralized space for multiple users to access and manage projects. RationalPlan collaborates with IBM, Sony, and Cisco to establish rules to assist users in business management.

RationalPlan has licenses proprietor software that is fee-based for Mac and Windows installations but has free use licences for Linux installations.
