= Pyrus (software) =

Cloud-based workflow automation system

- Developers: Simply Good Software, Inc.
- Type: Workflow Automation, Document & Task Management Software
- License: Proprietary
- Website: Pyrus.com

Pyrus is a cloud-based workflow automation and document management system developed by Simply Good Software, Inc. Pyrus comes as SaaS and offers a web-based interface to launch workflows, assign tasks, and manage documents. It is a unified corporate communication environment, accessible from any device. Mobile versions are available for all platforms, including iOS, Android, and Android Wear. Users are able to set up and route workflows without coding and IT assistance.

== History ==
Pyrus was founded by programmer and entrepreneur Max Nalsky.

Pyrus has been developed since 2010 and has run in beta for four years. In 2014 Pyrus announced a public launch, which the company claims attracted more than 120,000 users, who set up 8,500 workflows and completed 6,000,000 tasks within a year. Pyrus is one of the first business tools that delivered an app for Android Wear in July 2014.

On December 17, 2019, Pyrus registered its fifty-millionth task.

As of February 2020, the system has over 400,000 registered users.

== Software ==
The main idea behind Pyrus is to more effectively organize workflow, automate routine tasks and processes, and bring the use of email to a minimum.

One distinctive characteristic of Pyrus is its flexibility in providing users with varied possibilities for setting up their business processes, without needing to program, or call IT. Launching a new process in the system takes only a few minutes: you set up the form fields required for the process, establish the steps of the process, and add assignees and approvers. Pyrus also offers templates for standard business processes, from getting contracts and invoices approved, to applying for time off or coordinating business travel.

=== Functionality ===
What Pyrus offers:

- management of tasks and projects: delegating, routing, time monitoring, recurring tasks, subtasking to break up large tasks into smaller ones, lists, and kanban boards;
- communication with the team, and with external vendors and clients; structuring through tasks: discuss details, exchange files, and add related tasks;
- client request processing (Service Desk / Help Desk) through various communication channels: phone, email, chat / forms on the site or in the app, Instagram, Facebook Messenger, Telegram, Viber;
- electronic document processing: approval of requests, payments, contracts and other documents;
- a client database (CRM);
- easy-to-read analysis of the work of your co-workers and of business processes (request processing time, level of service, etc.)

More features:

- announcements for all employees of an organization;
- a library for creating a database of the company’s knowledge;
- catalogs;
- company organizational structure and all employee contact info;
- add guest users to the system to work with outside vendors, clients, and freelancers;
- create tasks from external emails;
- file attachment and integration of leading storage platforms (Google Drive, Dropbox, etc.);
- browser (Google Chrome, Mozilla Firefox) and email (Gmail, Outlook Online) extensions;
- a calendar;
- monitoring of time worked;
- searching by various attributes: discussion participant, key word, file name, goods, account number, and so on;
- information exporting.

=== Integrations ===
Pyrus supports integration with ERP and CRM systems, Microsoft Office software, social networks and messengers, email and cloud storage services. As of September 2020, Pyrus integrates with Salesforce Sales Cloud, Zoom, Facebook Messenger, Instagram, Telegram, Viber, Google Drive, Gmail, Microsoft Office, Microsoft Outlook, Dropbox, Active Directory, Box, amoCRM, IP-telephony, and more.

=== The mobile app ===
Pyrus mobile apps are available for iOS, Android and Android Wear, and they function offline. All actions, approvals, and correspondence is saved, and syncs with the server as soon as you’re back online. That way, co-workers can work from anywhere, including the subway or an airplane. Pyrus can send push-notifications to a user’s smartphone or smartwatch.

=== API ===
Pyrus has an API platform. This allows you to extend apps by adding a Pyrus function, or organize a bilateral data exchange between a corporate IT system and the online service. Pyrus API offers two integration methods: REST API, and HTTP-web service request (Webhooks).

For syncing Pyrus with the internal apps and systems of a company, the developer offers the Pyrus Sync app. Through this app, Pyrus bilaterally exchanges data with CRM systems, accounting programs, monitoring systems, and other databases.

== Security and privacy ==
- Information protection: Pyrus works with the secure protocol HTTPS, which is what online banking apps use for sending bank statements and transfer orders. For authentication, the system uses secure single-use codes; this protects the user from their password falling into the wrong hands.
- Personal data protection: Pyrus acts in accordance with the General Data Protection Regulation (GDPR).
- Backup: Pyrus replicates all data in real time, and saves two copies, on two geographically removed servers. In addition, Pyrus backs up daily, so that data can be restored in case of accident.

== Worldwide distribution ==
Pyrus users work in 40 different countries throughout the world. Companies use Pyrus to organize remote office monitoring, and automate business processes in fields such as sales, marketing, acquisitions, finance, HR, IT, and client services.
