= Tom's Planner =

Web-based project management tool

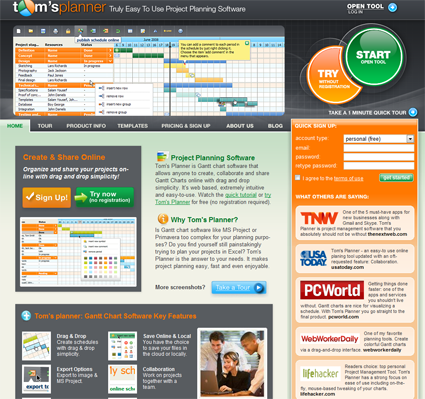
- Website type: Project management software
- Founded: 2009
- Headquarters: Curaçao, Netherlands Antilles
- Creator: Thomas Ummels
- Website: tomsplanner.com

Tom's Planner is a web-based tool and application service provider for project planning, management and collaboration.

== History ==
Tom's Planner is based on Curaçao. In November 2009, it announced its public beta launch on TechCrunch and moved out of beta in August 2010. In 2013 Tom's Planner acquired its competitor Gantto.

== Software ==
Tom's Planner is project management software that enables the creation of project schedules (Gantt charts) using a visual perspective. Tom's Planner uses the Freemium Business Model. Users can register for a free account or choose a paid version.

Tom's Planner is available in five languages and is used by thousands of users on a daily basis in more than 100 countries worldwide. Customers range from fortune 500 companies to small mom-and-pop shops.

== Reviews ==
Tom's Planner has been reviewed by PC World, TechCrunch, Lifehacker, and several other periodicals.
