= Scoro =

Software company

Scoro Software OÜ
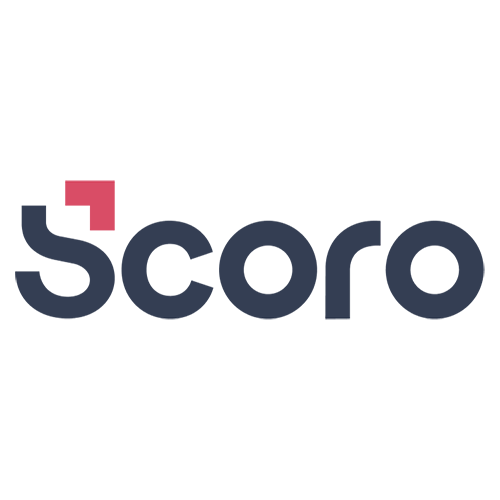
- Type: Private company
- Industry: Software as a Service (SaaS)
- Founded: 2013
- Founder: Fred Krieger
- Headquarters: London, England
- Area served: Worldwide
- Products: Professional Services Automation Software
- Website: www.scoro.com

Scoro is a provider of cloud-based professional services automation (PSA) software for professional services firms, including consultancies, agencies, architecture firms, and IT companies. Its platform includes tools for project management, resource planning, time tracking, billing, and financial reporting. The company is headquartered in London, England, with additional offices in New York, Tallinn, Riga, and Vilnius.

== History ==
Scoro was founded in 2013, in Tallinn, Estonia, by Fred Krieger.

In August 2016, Scoro secured $1.9 million in investment capital during its Seed round of funding, which was led by three VCs: Inventure, SmartCap, and Alchemist Accelerator. In November 2018, Scoro closed a $5 million Series A round led by Livonia Partners with participation from existing investors Inventure and Tera Ventures. The deal brings the total amount raised from investors to $6.9 million. In 2021, Scoro raised $16.4 million in a Series B round led by Kennet Partners, with participation from Columbia Lake Partners, Inventure, Livonia Partners, and Tera Ventures. In January 2026, Scoro acquired Envoice, an Estonian AI-driven expense and bill management company. The acquisition combined Scoro's project management capabilities with Envoice's automated invoice capture and expense approval tooling. Both products continued to operate independently following the transaction.

The company has been named one of the fastest-growing technology firms in Central Europe by the Deloitte Technology Fast 500. Scoro has also been featured on the Inc. magazine's Inc. 5000 list as one of the fastest-growing private companies in America. In 2019, Scoro was named as one of the hottest young companies across Europe and Israel by TNW.

== Software ==
=== Mobile ===
Scoro introduced its version 1.0 iOS and Android application in 2016, allowing users to work from their iPhone or Android devices.

=== Platform ===
Scoro is a provider of cloud-based professional services automation (PSA) software designed for professional services firms, including consultancies, agencies, architecture firms, and IT companies. It provides tools for project management, resource planning, time tracking, billing, and financial reporting within a single system. This design allows firms to manage work throughout the process without switching between multiple tools.

== Recognition and awards ==
=== 2017 ===
- Technology Fast 50 by Deloitte

=== 2018 ===
- Inc. 5000 fastest-growing companies in America
- Easiest to Use Business Process Management Software by G2

=== 2019 ===
- Best Software Companies in EMEA by G2
- FrontRunners for Project Management by Software Advice
- Category leader for Business Management category by GetApp
- Category leader for Project Management category by GetApp
- Easiest to Use Business Software by G2

=== 2022 ===
- Global Business Tech Awards: Tech Company of the Year (Medium Size) and Entrepreneur of the Year for CEO Fred Krieger
