= Easy Projects =

Project management software tool suite

- Developer: Logic Software
- Release: February 1, 2004
- Platform: Web platform, or Windows Server 2012 and later
- Type: Project Management Software
- License: Software as a service, or commercial proprietary software
- Website: www.easyprojects.net

Easy Projects is a suite of project management software developed by Toronto-based Logic Software. As an example of web based project management software, Easy Projects is designed to enable online project management via a browser, rather than manual tracking or desktop software applications.

== Platforms ==
Easy Projects was written in the ASP.NET programming language rather than ASP or PHP. The software runs in Windows and Mac environments. The software is normally implemented as online SaaS, or it can be implemented as a self-hosted solution.

== Features ==
Easy Projects provides functionality common to software designed for Project Management and Collaboration including configurable Dashboards, Integrated Reporting, Message boards, issue and request tracking, statistics, email notifications, and Gantt charts. Easy Projects is rated as the "more advanced" offering in Logic Software's multi-product Project Management software portfolio.

An add-in to synchronise Outlook data with Easy Projects accounts is available.

== History ==
Easy Projects software was developed and copyrighted by 2003 and was originally released in 2004.

== Users ==
Known users of Easy Projects include the U.S Federal Bureau of Investigation (FBI) Nuclear DNA and Mitochondrial DNA Units, who use the software to manage resource allocation, centralize program management, track Forensic Examiners’ spend, assign and define tasks and track the progress of individual projects.

== Reviews ==
Easy Projects has been reviewed by publications ranging from PM Network Magazine to online venues like VentureBeat, GigaOM, Freelance Weekly and Web-Based Software.
