= BigGantt =

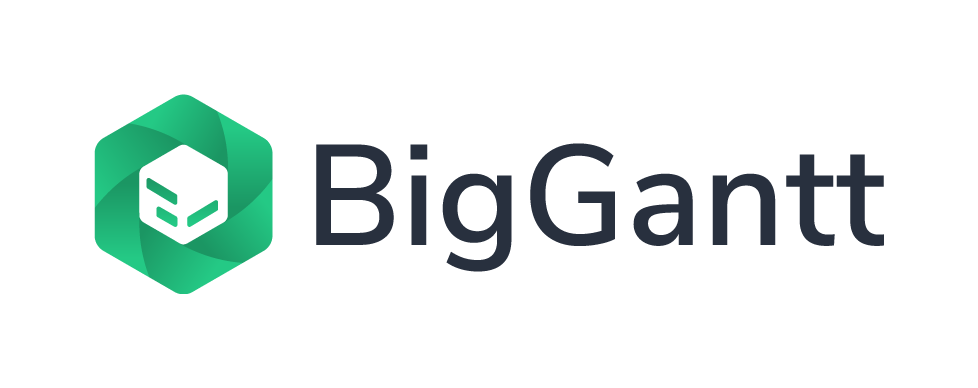
- Developer: SoftwarePlant
- Initial release: 2015; 10 years ago
- Stable release: 8.2
- Written in: Java, Angular
- Operating system: Jira
- Platform: Jira Cloud, Jira Server, Jira Data Center
- Type: Project management software
- License: Proprietary, free 30-day trial. Free for use by non-profit institutions – charities, hospitals, libraries and churches
- Website: marketplace.atlassian.com/apps/1213016/biggantt-gantt-chart-for-jira

BigGantt is a project management app for Jira. Released in 2015, it delivers tools for project managers, i.e. a Gantt chart, and work breakdown structure.

== Background ==
In 2012, eight years after the launch of Jira, Atlassian made Atlassian Marketplace available to the public to let independent developers make up for deficiencies of Jira. One of those deficiencies is the fact that Jira centers on modern, agile project management methodologies and neglects traditional, waterfall tools, such as the Gantt chart. And according to Project Management Institute, in 2017 89% of organizations still used waterfall project management methodologies.

== Product ==
BigGantt utilizes a user's web browser. The app displays Jira tasks on a timeline in the form of colored bars of various lengths. Compared to the original 1910s idea of a bar chart devised by Henry Gantt, BigGantt adds contemporary functionalities, i.e. dependencies between tasks on the chart (arrows that link two tasks and change color from green to red when a dependency becomes "impossible"), baselines (shady bars marking the original location of a moved task), critical path, markers (vertical red lines on the timeline indicating crucial dates in the project), milestones. Users can drag and drop tasks on a chart.

BigGantt is compatible with both Jira Core (essential functionalities) and Jira Software (essential functionalities + visual agile boards).

The app is written in Java and Angular.

== Reception ==
As of December 2021 BigGantt was used by at least 8824 enterprises.

In September 2017 the software was awarded Atlassian Marketplace Vendor of the Year 2017 for fastest cloud growth.

In June 2021 SoftwarePlant was acquired by Appfire.
