= Milestones Professional =

Project scheduling software

- Developer(s): KIDASA Software, Inc.
- Stable release: 2025 / January 15, 2025
- Written in: C++
- Operating system: Windows
- Type: Project management software
- License: Proprietary
- Website: kidasa.com

Milestones Professional is a project scheduling software developed by KIDASA Software, Inc., based in Austin, Texas, founded in 1989. Milestones Professional is a Windows-based program designed to create presentation-ready Gantt Charts and schedules for users.

== Features ==
- Gantt Chart Creation
- Import from Microsoft Project
- Calculate Earned Value

== Product History ==
KIDASA Software, Inc. was founded in 1989, and released Milestones, Etc. 1.0 in the same year. Since that time, KIDASA has released a new version about once every 2 years, the latest being Milestones Professional 2025.

The software is designed with mostly presentation in mind, with "Microsoft Project 2003 for Dummies" noting that, "Milestones Professional 2002's strength is in the way it allows you to communicate project information. Using Milestones Professional you can customize schedules to print out and distribute with a handy viewer for those who neither have Project nor Milestones, publish to the internet with an easy-to-use feature, and generate color reports to add an impact to project presentations."

Milestones Professional is also widely used in the aerospace industry. Milestones Professional has been shown to reduce total project costs through automation.

== Reviews ==
Milestones Professional has been reviewed at 2020Software.com, Golden Triangle PC Club, Bright Hub, PCMag.com, and InfoWorld
