= Workspace.com =

workspace.com
- Type: Privately held
- Industry: Software
- Headquarters: Columbia, Maryland
- Products: Project management software, Application lifecycle management
- Website: http://www.workspace.com/index-home.html

Workspace.com is a provider of an online collaborative workspace for information technology teams. The workspace includes project management software elements such as task management, gantt charts, resource management, issue tracking, and document management as well as application lifecycle management features such as change management, requirements management, test management, and bug tracking.

== History ==
In March 2001, Citrix Systems agreed to purchase Sequoia Software for $185 million. The following year, former Sequoia CEO, Mark Wesker, along with other ex-Sequoia employees created Artifact Software. This new company's first product, CodeJack was a code sharing platform for development teams to collaborate around software artifacts and projects. CodeJack was eventually abandoned. In 2004, Artifact Software began developing its flagship product, Lighthouse. This was aided in part by a $5 million Series A financing shortly thereafter in July 2005. The first version of Lighthouse was launched in February 2007 with both a free and a paid version.

On September 21, 2009 Artifact Software changed both its company name and product name to workspace.com.

== Development ==
Workspace.com is a project management tool offered as a service. It does not enforce any particular software development methodology. Unlike many other similar tools, it does not integrate into version control systems or integrated development environments; instead, it acts as standalone software.
