= Visma Solutions =

Business software company

- Company type: Subsidiary Joint stock company
- Founded: 2012; 14 years ago
- Headquarters: Lappeenranta, Finland
- Products: Business software, SaaS, PSA, E-accounting
- Revenue: 160,649,712 euro (2024)
- Number of employees: 522 (2024)
- Parent: Visma
- Website: severa.com// www.netvisor.fi

Visma Solutions is a Finnish company that offers SaaS business software. The company produces software for professional services automation, E-accounting, budgeting and forecasting, e-invoicing, and an online signature service. Visma Solutions is part of the Norwegian Visma group.

== History ==
Severa was founded in 2004 by Ari-Pekka Salovaara and Jari Kärkkäinen, students at Lappeenranta University of Technology. In 2010 the company was acquired by Visma, and from 2013 has been part of Visma Solutions.

Visma Solutions was founded at the end of 2012, when former joint stock company Netvisor was renamed Visma Solutions. Netvisor was founded by Markku Nylund, while he studied at Lappeenranta University of Technology. In 2000 Netvisor merged with Bittivisio; the first release came in 2002. Two years later Cap Gemini Ernst & Young bought Bittivisio, but sold Netvisor’s business in 2005 to Solanum Networks Economic Administration. In 2011 Netvisor became part of Visma group and at the end of 2012 became Visma Solutions.

In November 2020, Visma acquired Danish software company Ditmer.

== Products ==
- Severa is professional services automation software, optimized for organizations such as PR, advertising, design, IT, engineering, law, architecture and accounting firms.
- Netvisor is e-accounting software. The software is a pioneer in the field of e-accounting and SaaS software.
- Maventa is an e-invoicing service suitable for company sizes from SME’s to multinationals.
- ValueFrame is a PSA software suited for architects, advertising and communication agencies and consultants.
- Visma Sign is a legally binding online signature service. Visma Sign can be integrated to online forms for immediate signing, or used to send signing invitations via email and text messages.
