= EnQuire =

Enquire
- Developer: Tactiv Pty Ltd
- Stable release: 12.0 / 13 October 2016; 9 years ago
- Operating system: Web Based
- Type: Project, Contract, Grant Management & Reporting
- License: SaaS
- Website: tactiv.net

Enquire is a web-based software application used as a platform for project, contract and grant management, as well as reporting and planning.

Initially designed for the specific business requirements of the Australian Government, Queensland Government and Queensland Regional Bodies to manage natural resource projects, Enquire has since seen adoption outside of this industry and user segment. The use of Enquire by Natural Resource Management bodies within Queensland has been cited as a reason for the improved efficiency, quantity and quality of reporting.

Technically, Enquire is implemented as a Java application built on a MySQL database. Enquire is hosted and supported under the software as a service model by Tactiv Pty Ltd.

== History ==
The system was first released in 2005 under the name ViSTA NRM Online, proactively changing its name to Enquire in 2007 to avoid possible confusion with Windows Vista, which was being released at the time.

In 2012, the Enquire project and support team was commercialized as its own company called Tactiv Pty Ltd. Tactiv is based predominantly in Brisbane, Australia. Tactiv has continued to develop and grow the Enquire Grant, Contract and Project management solution, releasing a new platform in 2017. Since commercialization, Tactiv has grown its client base to include government and non-government organizations such as foundations and not-for-profit organizations.

== Functionality ==
The functionality of Enquire can be broken down into 5 key lifecycle solutions, all fully integrated and supported by over 40 feature rich and configurable modules:

- Grant Management
- Contract Management
- Project Portfolio Management
- Procurement Management
- Relationship Management

The system provides its platform to meet the needs of "off the shelf" customers looking for a ready to use best practice option as well as a fully configurable option for specific requirements. The system offers a client supplier portal for external applicants or suppliers, a management portal for internal team usage and an administration portal for clients to manage access, roles, information, and other configurations.

Key functional modules include:

- Online authoring and publishing for forms and applications
- Workflows
- Project Tracking
- Performance Reporting
- Financial Reporting
- Stakeholder Communication
- Budget management
- Document Management
- Milestone tracking
- Payments and Variations Management
- KPI tracking and Impact reporting

The Enquire system is used to report against the Queensland Government's Q2 Coast and Country Program and parts of the Australian Government's Caring for our Country program.

There is also a strategic planning module, which provides functionality to manage core-business administration and reporting requirements, whilst providing visibility of key activities and their alignment against organizational goals and strategic objectives.

The systems architecture supports a range of implementation models with the capacity to manage one-to-one, one-to-many and many-to-many relationships between investors and investees.

Under the usage model within Queensland, Regional Bodies use Enquire to load project contracts and report against these online. The regional bodies also record output, target and financial information in Enquire, which can then be used for operational purposes including financial, performance and target reporting.

== External Audit ==
The Australian National Audit Office Audit Report No.21 2007–08 undertook a case study on Enquire. It noted:

"The Queensland Department of Environment and Resource Management has developed the first integrated web-based system [Enquire] to manage performance information about Natural Resource Management activities in Queensland."

Four of Queensland's 14 regional bodies commented on Enquire through the ANAO's survey. These four regional bodies indicated that Enquire offers a means of consistent reporting at the State level.
