= TeamDynamix =

American technology company

- Company type: Private
- Industry: Enterprise software
- Founded: 2001; 25 years ago
- Headquarters: Columbus, Ohio
- Products: IT service management; Project Portfolio Management; Enterprise Service Management; Integration Platform as a Service
- Website: teamdynamix.com

TeamDynamix is a SaaS company that provides no-code IT Service Management (ITSM), IT Asset Management, Software Asset Management, Project Portfolio Management (PPM), Conversational AI virtual support agents, and Integration Platform as a Service (iPaaS) software. TeamDynamix's headquarters is located in Columbus, Ohio.

== History ==
TeamDynamix was founded in 2001 in Columbus, Ohio. In 2025, the company acquired Sassafras, an IT and Software Asset Management company.

== Products ==
- IT Service Management (ITSM) includes AI Service Assist, Incident / Problem Management, Change Management, Release Management, Asset Discovery & Management, and a highly configurable, accessible self-service portal and knowledge base with support. Organizations can adopt ITIL (Information Technology Infrastructure Library) with the platform.
- IT Asset Management and Software Asset Management
- Conversational AI Virtual Support Agents for multi-channel support.
- Project Portfolio Management (PPM) includes project management, project intake, governance, time tracking, reporting, and dashboards.
- Enterprise Service Management (ESM)
- Integration Platform as a Service (iPaaS) consists of API management, a connector library, and a visual, drag & drop flow builder.
