= Precedence diagram method =

Project management technique

The precedence diagram method (PDM) is a tool for scheduling activities in a project plan. It is a method of constructing a project schedule network diagram that uses boxes, referred to as nodes, to represent activities and connects them with arrows that show the dependencies. It is also called the activity-on-node (AON) method.

- Critical tasks, noncritical tasks, and slack time
- Shows the relationship of the tasks to each other
- Allows for what-if, worst-case, best-case and most likely scenario

Key elements include determining predecessors and defining attributes such as

- early start date
- late start date
- early finish date
- late finish date
- duration
- activity name
- WBS reference

Slack/Float: Determines the duration of activity delay that the project can tolerate before the project comes in late. The difference between the earliest and the latest start time. i.e. Slack = latest start date - earliest start day or Slack = latest finish time - earliest finish time.

Any activities which have a slack of 0, they are on the critical path.

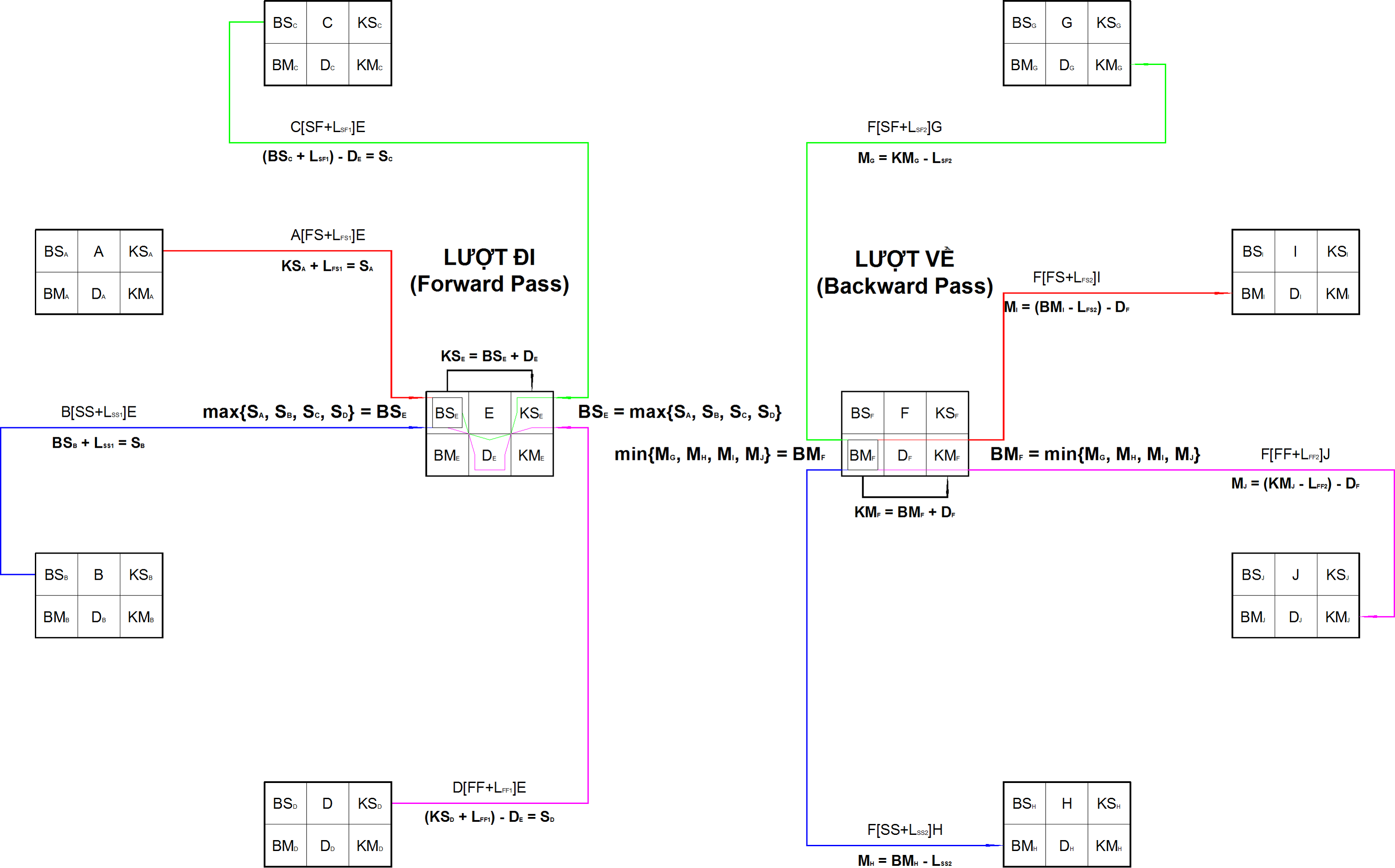
solving the PDM, with: BS is an early start date. BM is a late start date. KS is an early finish date. KM is a late finish date.

Different Precedence diagram Methods

- Arrow diagramming method
- Project network
- Critical-path method
- Gantt chart
- Program evaluation and review technique
