= Project slippage =

In project planning, a slippage is the act of missing a deadline. It can be an arbitrary milestone put in place to help track progress.

To avoid slippage, one must plan their projects (especially research) carefully to avoid delays in schedule. Using Gantt charts and timeline diagrams can help.
