= Project engineering =

Design of manufacturing or processing facilities

Project engineering includes all parts of the design of manufacturing or processing facilities, either new or modifications to and expansions of existing facilities. A "project" consists of a coordinated series of activities or tasks performed by engineers, designers, drafters and others from one or more engineering disciplines or departments. Project tasks consist of such things as performing calculations, writing specifications, preparing bids, reviewing equipment proposals and evaluating or selecting equipment and preparing various lists, such as equipment and materials lists, and creating drawings such as electrical, piping and instrumentation diagrams, physical layouts and other drawings used in design and construction. A small project may be under the direction of a project engineer. Large projects are typically under the direction of a project manager or management team. Some facilities have in house staff to handle small projects, while some major companies have a department that does internal project engineering. Large projects are typically contracted out to engineering companies. Staffing at engineering companies varies according to the work load and duration of employment may only last until an individual's tasks are completed.

== Overview ==
=== Responsibilities ===
The role of the project engineer can often be described as that of a liaison between the project manager and the technical disciplines involved in a project. The distribution of "liaising" and performing tasks within the technical disciplines can vary wildly from project to project; this often depends on the type of product, its maturity, and the size of the company, to name a few. It is important for a project engineer to understand that balance. The project engineer should be knowledgeable enough to be able to speak intelligently within the various disciplines, and not purely be a liaison. The project engineer is also often the primary technical point of contact for the consumer.

A project engineer's responsibilities include schedule preparation, pre-planning and resource forecasting for engineering and other technical activities relating to the project, and project delivery management. They may also be in charge of performance management of vendors. They assure the accuracy of financial forecasts, which tie-in to project schedules. They ensure projects are completed according to project plans. Project engineers manage project team resources and training and develop extensive project management experience and expertise.

=== Engineering companies (consulting engineers) ===
When used, an engineering company is generally contracted to conduct a study (capital cost estimate or technical assessment) or to design a project. Projects are designed to achieve some specific objective, ranging in scope from simple modifications to new factories or expansions costing hundreds of millions or even billions of dollars. The client usually provides the engineering company with a scoping document listing the details of the objective in terms of such things as production rate and product specifications and general to specific information about processes and equipment to be used and the expected deliverables, such as calculations, drawings, lists, specifications, schedules, etc. The client is typically involved in the entire design process and makes decisions throughout, including the technology, type of equipment to use, bid evaluation and supplier selection, the layout of equipment and operational considerations. Depending on the project the engineering company may perform material and energy balances to size equipment and to quantify inputs of materials and energy (steam, electric power, fuel). This information is used to write specifications for the equipment. The equipment specifications are sent out for bids. The client, the engineering company or both select the equipment. The equipment suppliers provide drawings of the equipment, which are used by the engineering company's mechanical engineers, and drafters to make general arrangement drawings, which show how the pieces of equipment are located in relation to other equipment. Layout drawings show specific information about the equipment, electric motors powering the equipment and such things as auxiliary equipment (pumps, fans, air compressors), piping and buildings. The engineering company maintains an equipment list with major equipment, auxiliary equipment, motors, etc. Electrical engineers are involved with power supply to motors and equipment. Process engineers perform material and energy balances and design the piping and instrumentation diagrams to show how equipment is supplied with process fluids, water, air, gases, etc. and the type of control loops used. The instrumentation and controls engineers specify the instrumentation and controls and handle any computer controls and control rooms. Civil and structural engineers deal with site layout and engineering, building design and structural concerns like foundations, pads, structures, supports and bracing for equipment. Environmental engineers deal with any air emissions and treatment of liquid effluent.

=== Fields and topics ===
The various fields and topics that projects engineers are involved with include:

- Work breakdown structure: a deliverable-oriented breakdown of a project into smaller components
- Gantt chart: type of bar chart that illustrates a project schedule
- Critical Path Analysis: an algorithm for scheduling a set of project activities
- Program evaluation and review technique: a statistical tool which was designed to analyze and represent the tasks involved in completing a given project
- Graphical Evaluation and Review Technique: network analysis technique that allows probabilistic treatment both network logic and estimation of activity duration
- Petri Nets: one of several mathematical modeling languages for the description of distributed systems

== Construction industry ==
Project engineers are often project managers with qualifications in engineering or construction management. Other titles include field engineer, construction engineer, or construction project engineer. In smaller projects, this person may also be responsible for contracts and will be called an assistant project manager. A similar role is undertaken by a client's engineer or owner's engineer, but by inference, these often act more in the interests of the commissioning company.

Project engineers do not necessarily do design work, but instead represent the contractor or client out in the field, help tradespeople interpret the job's designs, ensure the job is constructed according to the project plans, and assist project controls, including budgeting, scheduling, and planning. In some cases a project engineer is responsible for assisting the assigned project manager with regard to design and a project and with the execution of one or more simultaneous projects in accordance with a valid, executed contract, per company policies and procedures and work instructions for customized and standardized plants.

Typical responsibilities may include: daily operations of field work activities and organization of subcontractors; coordination of the implementation of a project, ensuring it is being built correctly; project schedules and forecasts; interpretation of drawings for tradesmen; review of engineering deliverables; redlining drawings; regular project status reports; budget monitoring and trend tracking; bill of materials creation and maintenance; effective communications between engineering, technical, construction, and project controls groups; and assistance to the project manager.
