= Schedule network analysis =

Schedule Network Analysis is a strategy that is commonly used in project management. The strategy consists of visualising the different project tasks and making connections between them in the project management plan.

For making a final schedule, a schedule network analysis is finished utilizing a draft schedule. Numerous strategies may be utilized to make the final schedule, for example:

- Defining critical and non-critical tasks using critical path method
- Ascertaining and analyze possible events that can take place in the future using scenario analysis
- Shortening the schedule using a schedule compression
- Considering activity interdependence and resource constraints using critical chain project management
- Overlooking resource allocation using resource leveling

== See also ==
- Computer network diagram
- Project network
- Precedence diagram method
