= Terms of reference =

Defined purpose and structure of a project

Terms of reference (TOR) define the purpose and structures of a project, committee, meeting, negotiation, or any similar collection of people who have agreed to work together to accomplish a shared goal.

Terms of reference show how the object in question will be defined, developed, and verified. They should also provide a documented basis for making future decisions and for confirming or developing a common understanding of the scope among stakeholders. In order to meet these criteria, success factors/risks and constraints are fundamental. They define the:

- vision, objectives, scope and deliverables (i.e. what has to be achieved)
- stakeholders, roles and responsibilities (i.e. who will take part in it)
- resource, financial and quality plans (i.e. how it will be achieved)
- work breakdown structure and schedule (i.e. when it will be achieved)

TORs could include:

- success factors, risks and constraints.

Although the terms of reference of a project are sometimes referred to as the project charter, there are significant differences between the two. This article describes a TOR containing detailed definitions, while a project charter has high-level requirements, assumptions, constraints and descriptions as well as a budget summary without detail, and a milestone-only schedule.

== Project life-cycle ==
The terms of reference are created during the earlier stages of project management by the founders of the project in question, immediately after the approval of a project business case. They are documented by the project manager and presented to the project sponsor or sponsors for approval. Once the terms have been approved, the members of the project team have a clear definition of the scope of the project. They will then be ready to progress with implementing the remaining project deliverables.

This phrase "terms of reference" often refers to tasks assigned to a consultant or adviser. Such a consultant or adviser may be engaged via a contract with general terms of engagement that also incorporate the terms of reference that specifically describe the consultant's task.

== See also ==
- Project management
- Project manager
- Risk management
- Quality management
