= Schedule compression =

Schedule compression refers to a series of techniques used to shorten the duration of a project without compromising the result. Common schedule compression techniques include crashing, fast-tracking and resource reallocation.

== Compression methods ==
The goal of schedule compression is to shorten the project without amending the project scope, according to the schedule constraints, required time and other objectives. Any compression must be done in the critical path activities. The most common techniques used for schedule compression are:

- Performing tasks in parallel using Fast Track
- Adding resources by Crashing.

== See also ==
- Project network
- Project planning
- Float (project management)
- Parkinson's law
