= Resource smoothing =

In project management, resource smoothing is defined by A Guide to the Project Management Body of Knowledge (PMBOK Guide) as a "resource optimization technique in which free and total float are used without affecting the critical path" of a project. Resource smoothing as a resource optimization technique has only been introduced in the Sixth Edition of the PMBOK Guide (since 2017) and did not exist in its previous revisions. It is posed as an alternative and a distinct resource optimization technique beside resource leveling.

The main difference between resource leveling and resource smoothing is that while resource leveling uses the available float, thus may affect a critical path, resource smoothing uses free and total float without affecting any of the critical paths. Thus, while resource leveling can be considered a constraint in order to adjust with certain resource supply limitation, for example, not to over-work some human resources, resource smoothing can be considered a useful method to solve the problem of a more flexible constraint if time of a deadline is a stronger constraint.

Just like resource leveling, a resource smoothing problem could be formulated as an optimization problem. The problem could be solved by different optimization algorithms such as exact algorithms or metaheuristics.

== See also ==
- Resource allocation
- Resource leveling
