= Construction delay =

Situation where construction starts or concludes later than expected

Construction delays are situations where project events occur at a later time than expected due to causes related to the client, consultant, and contractor etc. In residential and light construction, construction delays are often the result of miscommunication between contractors, subcontractors, and property owners. These types of misunderstandings and unrealistic expectations are usually avoided through the use of detailed critical path schedules, which specify the work, and timetable to be used, but most importantly, the logical sequence of events which must occur for a project to be completed.

== Incidence and impact of delays ==
In more complex projects, problems will arise that are not foreseen in the original contract, and so other legal construction forms are subsequently used, such as change orders, lien waivers, and addenda. In construction projects, besides other projects where a schedule is being used to plan work, delays are likely to happen all the time. Delays in construction projects are frequently expensive, since there is usually a construction loan involved which charges interest, management staff dedicated to the project whose costs are time dependent, and ongoing inflation in wage and material prices.

== Analysis of delays ==
What is being delayed determines if a project, or some other deadline such as a milestone, will be completed late. Before analyzing construction delays, a clear understanding of the general types is necessary. There are four basic ways to categorize delays:

- Critical or Non-Critical
- Excusable or Non-Excusable
- Concurrent or Non-Concurrent
- Compensable or Non-Compensable

Before determining the impact of a delay on the project, one must determine whether the delay is critical or non-critical. Additionally, all delays are either excusable or non-excusable. Both excusable and non-excusable delays can be defined as either concurrent or non-concurrent. Delays can be further broken down into compensable or non-compensable delays.

== Management solutions to delays ==
Construction supply chain plays a major role in construction market competition. Construction supply chain management assists enterprises by helping to improve competitiveness, increase profits and have more control over the different factors and variables within the project. A. Cox and P. Ireland illustrated the myriad of construction supply chains which constitute the main flows within the construction supply chain. In his research, Ghaith Al-Werikat analysed delays in relation to the myriad of construction supply chains. In particular, material flow, equipment flow, information flow, labour flow and client's information flow, offering a quantification of the impact of supply chain delays on construction projects performance. On the other hand, Economic historian Robert E. Wright argues that construction delays are caused by bid gaming, change order artistry, asymmetric information, and post contractual market power. Until those fundamental issues are confronted and resolved, many custom construction projects will continue to come in over budget, past due, or below contract specifications, he claims.

== See also ==
- Construction
- Civil engineering
- Project planning
