= Gur Mosheiov =

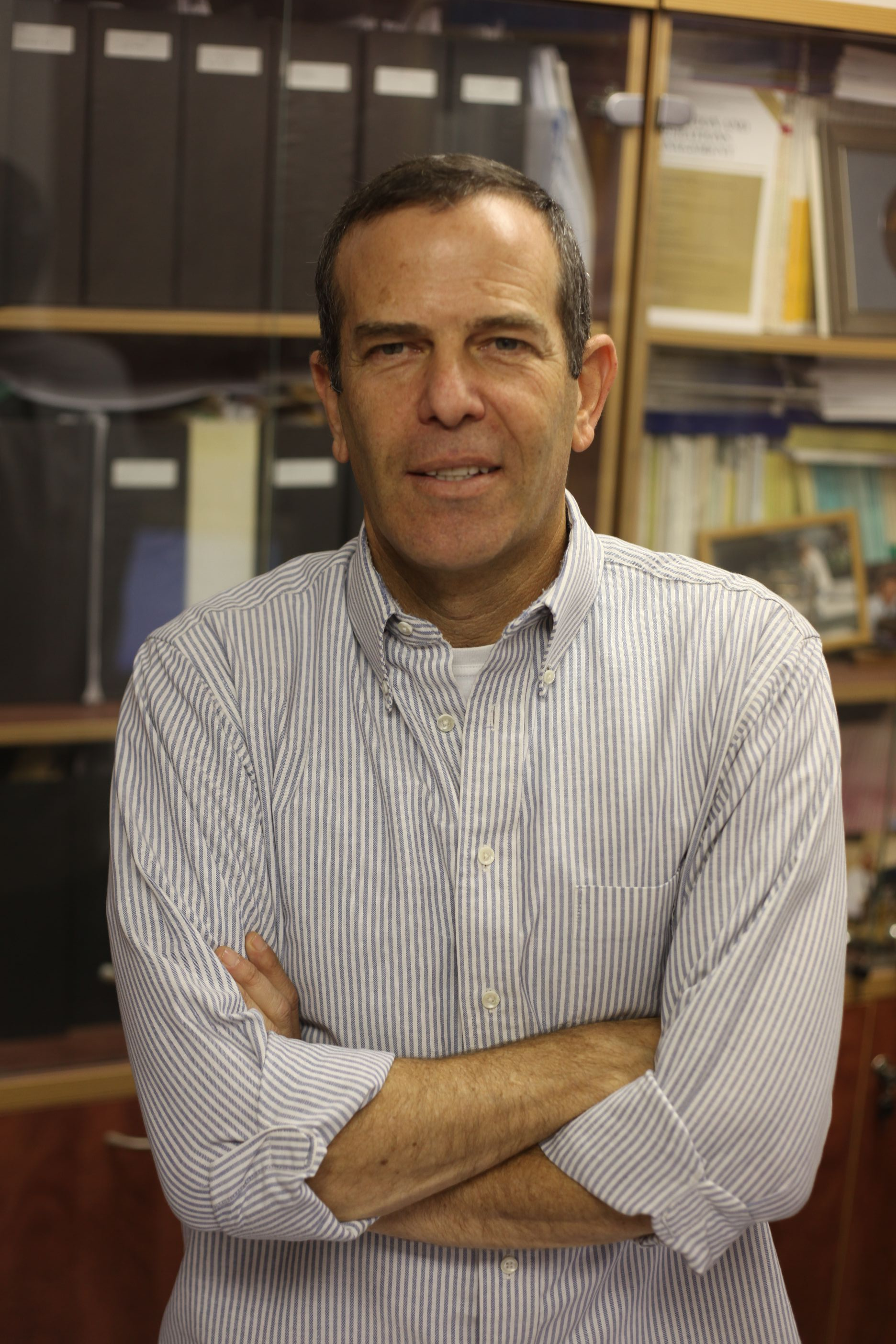
Professor Gur Moshiov

Gur Mosheiov (Hebrew: גור מושיוב) is a Professor of Operations Research and Operations Management at the Jerusalem School of Business administration at the Hebrew University of Jerusalem. He is also the Charles Rosen Professor of Management.

== Biography ==
Gur Mosheiov had his BA in mathematics and physics and his MBA in Business Administration (Operations Research) at the Hebrew University of Jerusalem. He had his Ph.D at Columbia University in New York. Professor Mosheiov has published 120 articles on a world leading journals of operational research and lectured in leading Universities such as Colombia and CUNY in New York and HSE in Finland. Since the year of 1999, Mosheiov serves as the head of the MBA program at the Jerusalem School of Business Administration at the Hebrew University.

== Research ==
Mosheiov research field is mainly Combinatorial Optimization, and focus on various types of scheduling problems.

== Selected published works ==
- G. Mosheiov. (1992). V-Shaped policies for scheduling deteriorating jobs. Operations Research, Vol. 39, No. 6, pp. 979–991.
- G. Mosheiov. (1994). The traveling salesman problem with pick-up and delivery. European Journal of Operational Research, Vol. 79, pp. 299–310.
- G. Mosheiov. (1994). Scheduling jobs under simple linear deterioration. Computers and Operations Research, Vol. 21, No. 6, 653-659.
- A. Federgruen and G. Mosheiov. (1996). Heuristics for multi-machine scheduling problems with earliness and tardiness costs. Management Science, 42, pp. 1544–1556.
- A. Federgruen and G. Mosheiov. (1997). Single machine scheduling problems with general breakdowns, earliness and tardiness costs. Operations Research, 45, pp. 66–71.
- G. Mosheiov. (2000). Minimizing Mean Absolute Deviation from the Mean Completion Time. Naval Research Logistics, 47, pp. 657–668.
- G. Mosheiov. (2001). Scheduling problems with learning effect. European Journal of Operational Research, 132, pp. 687–693.
- G. Mosheiov. (2002). The complexity of job-shop scheduling with deteriorating jobs. Discrete Applied Mathematics, 117, pp. 195–209.
- G. Mosheiov. (2001). Parallel machine scheduling with a learning effect. Journal of the Operational Research Society, 52, pp. 1–5.
- G. Mosheiov and J. Sidney. (2003). Scheduling with general job-dependent learning curves. European Journal of Operational Research, 147, pp. 665–670.
- G. Mosheiov. (2004). Simultaneous minimization of total completion time and total deviation of job completion time. European Journal of Operational Research, 157, pp. 296–306.
- G. Mosheiov and D. Oron. (2004). Due-window assignment with unit processing time jobs. Naval Research Logistics, pp. 1005–1017.
- G. Mosheiov and U. Yovel. (2006). Minimizing weighted earliness-tardiness and due-date cost with unit processing time jobs. European Journal of Operational Research, 172, pp. 528–544.
- G. Mosheiov and D. Oron. (2008). An m-machine open shop batch scheduling to minimize makespan. European Journal of Operational Research, 187, pp. 1282–1292.
- G. Mosheiov and A. Sarig. (2009). Due-date assignment on uniform machines. European Journal of Operational Research, 193, pp. 49–58.
- G. Mosheiov and A. Sarig. (2010). Minimum weighted number of tardy jobs on an m-machine flow-shop with a critical machine. European Journal of Operational Research, 201, pp. 404–408.
- B. Mor and G. Mosheiov. (2010). Scheduling problems with two competing agents to minimize minmax and minsum earliness measures. European Journal of Operational Research, 206, pp. 540–546.
- B. Mor and G. Mosheiov. (2011). Single machine batch scheduling with two competing agents to minimize total flowtime. European Journal of Operational Research, 215, pp. 524–531.
- E. Gerstl and G. Mosheiov. (2013). Scheduling problems with two competing agents to minimize weighted earliness-tardiness. Computers and Operations Research, 40, pp. 109–116.
- G. Mosheiov and D. Shabtay. (2013). Maximizing the weighted number of Just-In-Time jobs on a single machine with position-dependent processing times. Journal of Scheduling. 16, pp. 519–527.
- B. Mor and G. Mosheiov. (2014). Polynomial time solutions for scheduling problems on a proportionate flowshop with two competing agents. Journal of the Operational Research Society, 65, pp. 151–157. (Was chosen by the editorial board of JORS as one of the "10 influential articles" of the journal, 2013)
- E. Gerstl and G. Mosheiov. (2014). The optimal number of used machines in a two-stage flexible flow shop scheduling problem. Journal of Scheduling, 17, pp. 199–210.
- E. Gerstl and G. Mosheiov. (2014). Single machine Just-in-Time scheduling problems with two competing agents. Naval Research Logistics, 61, pp. 1–16
