= Garma Electric =

Iranian engineering, procurement and construction company

- Industry: Plant Engineering
- Founded: November 25, 2003 (Amol)
- Headquarters: Amol, Iran
- Area served: Worldwide
- Products: Pellet Mill machines, Feed Production Lines, Poultry equipment, Agricultural Machinery, Food industries, Driers, Hammer Mills, Heater, Cooler, Ventilation Fan, Fish Powder Production Lines
- Services: Business services, financing, project engineering and Procurement construction
- Divisions: Industry, Energy, Agriculture
- Website: www.garmaelectric.com

Garma Electric is an Iranian engineering, procurement and construction company. The main field of Garma Electric work is design, construction and procurement of agricultural machinery and food industries.the company is located in Amol, Iran.

== Founding ==
The company was founded on 25 November 2003 and opened with five employees. Garma Electric starts producing with Feed and Turn Dryers.

== Fields of Activity ==
- Pellet Mill machines
- Feed Production Lines
- Poultry equipment
- Agricultural Machinery
- Food industries, Driers
- Hammer Mills
- Heater
- Cooler
- Ventilation Fan
- Fish Powder Production Lines
