= Studiometry =

Studiometry is a project management software for managing bill clients, track working work, generating estimates, and producing customizable reports. All of the saved data is interlinked which lets the user traverse all of their data anyway they would like to.

== Reception ==
The software received positive reception for its ability to automatically generate invoices based on criteria, but critics panned that the web-hosted help file coverage was basic while unlimited phone support bumped up the price.
