= Easynote =

Web-based project management tool

- Developer: Easynote AB
- Release: 1 May 2016; 10 years ago
- Operating system: Web Application
- Available in: English, Swedish, Spanish, Italian, German
- Type: Project management software
- Website: www.easynote.com

Easynote is a web-based project management tool created by Made Solutions International in 2016. Easynote was acquired in August 2020, and is today owned by Easynote AB, which is based in Malmö, Sweden.

Since the tool's release, it has been offered to users free of charge, and is designed for both personal and collaborative use. The software can be used by small, medium and large enterprise companies.

== History ==
Easynote was created by Made Solutions International founder Mensur Zahirović, a Bosnian-Swedish developer and tech entrepreneur. Zahirović's previous enterprises included an e-commerce company, and Cmok.net, a social network and dating site in Bosnia and Herzegovina.

The tool launched in March 2016. The site surpassed 5,000 users in January 2017, seven months after its initial release. Easynote has seen almost a three-fold increase in registrations over a six month period and has 14,900 users, as of July 2017. As of June 2020, Easynote had than 60,000 users.

In July 2017, Easynote announced that it's been accepted to exhibit at Web Summit 2017 technology conference, which took place in Lisbon, Portugal in November 2017.

Easynote AB has announced that it is rebuilding Easynote from scratch, to launch the next generation productivity tool and that will be launched in 2021.

== Features ==
Easynote has been designed to be able to manage day-to-day tasks with no user training required. Projects are nominated as to-do lists, which contain tasks and subtasks. Tasks can be assigned to different members, and users are able to set deadlines, change statuses and assign levels of urgency. Checklists and an Activity map are used to monitor the creation, progression and completion of todo lists and tasks.

== Architecture ==
Easynote was developed with such Open Source technologies as PHP, MYSQL, Apache and Jquery.

The next generation of Easynote has been rebuilt from scratch, and is being built on Node.js, Vue.js, Elasticsearch, and Socket.io.
