= Arrow diagramming method =

Network-diagramming technique in which activities are represented by arrows

Arrow diagramming method (ADM) is a network diagramming technique in which activities are represented by arrows. ADM is also known as the activity-on-arrow (AOA) method.

== Usage ==
ADM is used for scheduling activities in a project plan. Precedence relationships between activities are represented by circles connected by one or more arrows. The length of the arrow represents the duration of the relevant activity. ADM only shows finish-to-start relationships, meaning that each activity is completed before the successor activity starts.

Sometimes a "dummy task" is added, to represent a dependency between tasks, which does not represent any actual activity. The dummy task is added to indicate precedence that can't be expressed using only the actual activities. Such a dummy task often has a completion time of 0.

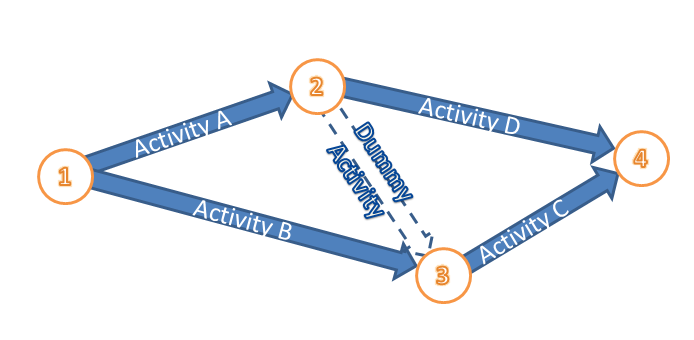

Use of ADM as a common project management practice has declined with the adoption of computer-based scheduling tools. In addition, the precedence diagram method (PDM), or activity-on-node (AON), is often favored over ADM.

ADM network drawing technique the start and end of each node or event is connected to an arrow.

The start of the arrow comes out of a node while the tip of the arrow goes into a node. Between the two nodes lies an arrow that represents the activity.

The event represented by the circular node consumes neither time nor resources.

- A node is a specific, definable achievement in the project.
- It has zero duration and consumes nil resources.
- All activities that lead into a node must be completed before the activity lines following this node can start.

== See also ==
- Precedence diagram method
- Program Evaluation and Review Technique
