= Bhubaneswar ITIR =

The Bhubaneswar ITIR is one of the planned 40 "Information Technology Investment Regions" in India. It is proposed over an area of about 40.5 km^{2} (10000 acres) in Bhubaneswar in the region encompassing Infocity-I and Infocity-II. The Detailed Project Report (DPR) is being prepared by IL&FS Infrastructures Ltd in collaboration with the state-owned Industrial Infrastructure Development Corp (IDCO).

== Timeline ==
- ITIR reduced by 6–7 km^{2} due to the proposed IIT and International Airport.
