= Schedule (project management) =

Listing of a project's milestones and deliverables in project management

In project management, a schedule is a listing of a project's milestones, activities, and deliverables. Usually dependencies and resources are defined for each task, then start and finish dates are estimated from the resource allocation, budget, task duration, and scheduled events. A schedule is commonly used in the project planning and project portfolio management parts of project management. Elements on a schedule may be closely related to the work breakdown structure (WBS) terminal elements, the Statement of work, or a Contract Data Requirements List.

== Overview ==
In many industries, such as engineering and construction, the development and maintenance of the project schedule is the responsibility of a full-time scheduler or team of schedulers, depending on the size and the scope of the project. The techniques of scheduling are well developed but inconsistently applied throughout industry. Standardization and promotion of scheduling best practices are being pursued by the Association for the Advancement of Cost Engineering (AACE), the Project Management Institute (PMI), and the US Government for acquisition and accounting purposes.

Project management is not limited to industry; the average person can use it to organize their own life. Some examples are:

- Homeowner renovation project
- Keeping track of all the family activities
- Coaching a team
- Planning a vacation
- Planning a wedding

Some project management software programs provide templates, lists, and example schedules to help their users with creating their schedule.

== Methods ==
The project schedule is a calendar that links the tasks to be done with the resources that will do them. It is the core of the project plan used to show the organization how the work will be done, commit people to the project, determine resource needs, and used as a kind of checklist to make sure that every task necessary is performed. Before a project schedule can be created, the schedule maker should have a work breakdown structure (WBS), an effort estimate for each task, and a resource list with availability for each resource. If these components for the schedule are not available, they can be created with a consensus-driven estimation method like Wideband Delphi.

To develop a project schedule, the following needs to be completed:

- Project scope
- Sequence of activities

- The schedule must be constantly updated (weekly works best).
- The EAC (Estimation at Completion) value must be equal to the baseline value.
- The remaining effort must be appropriately distributed among team members (taking vacations into consideration).

The schedule structure may closely follow and include citations to the index of work breakdown structure or deliverables, using decomposition or templates to describe the activities needed to produce the deliverables defined in the WBS.

A schedule may be assessed for the quality of the schedule development and the quality of the schedule management.

== See also ==
- Arrow diagramming method
- Gantt chart
- Integrated Master Schedule (IMS)
- Job shop scheduling
- List of project management software
- Precedence diagram method
- Project planning
- Project Portfolio Management (PPR)
- Resource allocation
- Risk management
- Scheduling
