= Graphical Evaluation and Review Technique =

Project management tool

Graphical Evaluation and Review Technique (GERT) is a network analysis technique used in project management that allows for the probabilistic treatment of both network logic and estimation of activity duration. The technique was first described in 1966 by Dr. Alan B. Pritsker of Purdue University and WW Happ.

Compared to other techniques, GERT is only rarely used in complex systems. Nevertheless, the GERT approach addresses the majority of the limitations associated with PERT/CPM technique. GERT allows loops between tasks. The fundamental drawback associated with the GERT technique is the complex programme (Monte Carlo simulation) required to model the GERT system. Development in GERT includes Q-GERTS - allowing the user to consider queuing within the system.

== General GERT rules ==
GERT uses activity-on-arrow notation only. That means that each activity is described on arrow. The nodes are used to connect activities, but also to determine type and conditions of relations between them.

Each task has two parameters: duration and probability of appearance.

There are three logical operators in GERT which concern activities incoming to the node:

- XOR - alternative (only one path possible)
- OR - alternative (one or more paths can be performed)
- AND - all paths have to be performed

The most common is AND, which means that every incoming activity has to happen before the outcoming one start.

There are also two types of relations that concern activities outcoming from the node:

- deterministic - every outcoming activity has probability equal to 1, which means that everyone will be performed
- probabilistic - each outcoming activity has some probability of appearance.

== GERT vs. other network diagrams ==
It's much less popular than PERT (Program Evaluation and Review Technique) or CPM (Critical Path Method) however, it allows some of those methods limitations to be addressed. The main limitations of PERT or CPM that might be addressed by GERT are:

- there are no alternative paths - all activities have to be performed
- there are no loops - it is not possible to repeat activity, next similar activity has to be added
- there are no decisions in the diagram - no and, or, xor options which help to choose proper path
- there is no scaling - it is not possible to replace some detailed group of activities with the one summary task.

GERT can help address these but at the cost of more sophisticated diagrams.
