= Project network =

Diagram showing the order of activities

A project network diagram, also known an activity network diagram (AND) is a graph that displays the order in which a project’s activities are to be completed. Derived from the work breakdown structure, the terminal elements of a project are organized sequentially based on the relationship among them. It is typically drawn from left to right to reflect project chronology.

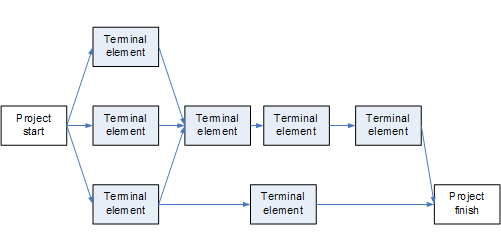
Activity-on-Node Diagram

== Techniques ==
=== Activity-on-Node ===
The Activity-on-Node (AON) technique uses nodes to represent individual project activities and path arrows to designate the sequence of activity completion. Nodes are labelled using information pertaining to the activity. According to Project Management, nodes should at least display the following information:

- Identifier
- Descriptive label
- Activity duration
- Early start time
- Early finish time
- Late start time
- Late finish time
- Activity float (slack)

Activity Node Labels

Start and finish times are used to determine the critical path of a project. Activity float, or slack, time is used in project crashing.

== Other techniques ==
The condition for a valid project network is that it doesn't contain any circular references.

Project dependencies can also be depicted by a predecessor table. Although such a form is very inconvenient for human analysis, project management software often offers such a view for data entry.

An alternative way of showing and analyzing the sequence of project work is the design structure matrix or dependency structure matrix.

== See also ==
- Bar chart
- Float (project management)
- Gantt chart
- Project management
- Project planning
- Program evaluation and review technique
