= Milestone (project management) =

Major points in a project's timeline towards completion

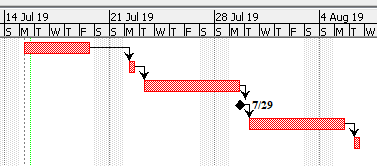
A milestone, when placed in project management software, is done as a zero-time task and appears with a special notation (black diamond in this case).

Milestones are tools used in project management to mark specific points along a project timeline. These points may signal anchors such as a project start and end date, or a need for external review or input and budget checks. Some contracts for products include a "milestone fee" that may be paid out when certain points are achieved.

In many instances, milestones do not impact project duration. Instead, they focus on major progress points that must be reached to achieve success.

== Using milestones in scheduling ==
Milestones can add significant value to project scheduling. When combined with a scheduling methodology such as program evaluation and review technique or the critical path method, milestones allow project managers to much more accurately determine whether or not the project is on schedule. By constraining the dates associated with milestones, the critical path can be determined for major schedule intervals in addition to the entire project. Float (also known as slack) can also be calculated on each schedule interval. This segmentation of the project schedule into intervals allows earlier indication of schedule problems and a better view into the activities for which completion is critical.

Milestones are like dashboard reviews of a project. A number of activities, which were planned at the beginning of the project with their individual timelines, are reviewed for their status. This process also gives an opportunity to check the health of the project.

Milestones are frequently used to monitor the progress, but limitations to their effectiveness exist. They usually show progress only on the critical path, and ignore noncritical activities. Resources are commonly moved from noncritical activities to critical activities to ensure that milestones are met. This gives the impression that the project is on schedule, when actually some activities are being ignored.

== See also ==
- Benchmarking
- Deliverable
