= Project management software =

Computer software to manage projects

Project management software are computer programs that help plan, organize, and manage resources.

Depending on the sophistication of the software, it can manage estimation and planning, scheduling, cost control, budget management, resource allocation, collaboration software, communication, decision-making, quality management, time management and documentation or administration systems.

Numerous PC and browser-based project management software and contract management software products and services are available.

== History ==
=== Predecessors ===
The first historically relevant year for the development of project management software was 1896, marked by the introduction of the Harmonogram. Polish economist Karol Adamiecki attempted to display task development in a floating chart and laid the foundation for project management software as it is today. In 1912, Henry Gantt replaced the Harmonogram with the more advanced Gantt chart. The Gantt chart was largely used by the United States during World War I. Today's Gantt charts are almost the same as their original counterparts and are a part of many project management systems.

=== Emergence of the term "project management" and modernized techniques ===
The term project management was not used prior to 1954 when US Air Force General Bernard Adolph Schriever introduced it for military purposes. In the years to follow, project management gained relevance in the business world — a trend that had a lot to do with the formation of the American Association of Engineers AACE (1956), and Rang and DuPont's Critical Path Method, which has been used to calculate project duration ever since 1957.

The trend is also related to the appearance of the Program Evaluation Review Technique (PERT) in 1958. PERT advanced project monitoring, enabling users to simultaneously monitor tasks, evaluate their quality, and estimate the time needed to accomplish each of them. Like Gantt charts and CPM, PERT was invented for military purposes, this time for the US Navy Polaris missile submarine program.

In 1965, there was a new improvement in project management technology. The US Department of Defense presented the work breakdown structure (WBS) to dissolve projects into even smaller visual units, organizing them in a hierarchical tree structure. WBS was an inspiration for Winston Royce’s Waterfall Method (1970) where management phases are organized in a way that doesn’t allow a new task to begin before the previous ones are completed.

=== The first project management products and associations ===
In the period between 1965 and 1969, two of the leading project management associations were formed: the International Project Management Association (IPMA) in Europe, and the Project Management Institute (PMI) which trains project management professionals and issues certificates. With businesses shifting towards technology-based and paperless methods, the first project management systems started to emerge. Oracle and Artemis launched their project managers in 1977, while Scitor Corporation did the same in 1979. Many improvements followed in the upcoming decades. In 1986, Carnegie Mellon University’s Software Engineering Institute introduced capability maturity software, a five-level project management method for rapidly maturing processes, while in 1988, users were introduced to earned value management which added processes’ scope and cost to the schedule. The trend continued with PRINCE2 (1996) which increased the number of processes to seven, because of which developers considered designing products for managing complex projects. In 2001, they adopted the Agile project management concept and focused on adaptive planning and flexible response to changes. In 2006, users were already able to trigger total cost management, a framework that helps control and reduce costs in project management.

== Tasks and activities ==
=== Scheduling ===
One of the most common project management software tool types is scheduling tools. Scheduling tools are used to sequence project activities and assign dates and resources to them. The detail and sophistication of a schedule produced by a scheduling tool can vary considerably with the project management methodology used, the features provided and the scheduling methods supported. Scheduling tools may include support for:

- Multiple dependency relationship types between activities
- Resource assignment and leveling
- Critical path
- Activity duration estimation and probability-based simulation
- Activity cost accounting

=== Providing information ===
Project planning software can be expected to provide information to various people or stakeholders, and can be used to measure and justify the level of effort required to complete the project(s). Typical requirements might include:

- Overview information on how long tasks will take to complete.
- Early warning of any risks to the project.
- Information on workload, for planning holidays.
- Evidence.
- Historical information on how projects have progressed, and in particular, how actual and planned performance are related.
- Optimum utilization of available resources.
- Cost maintenance.
- Collaboration with each teammate and customer.

== Types ==
=== Collaborative ===
A collaborative system is designed to support multiple users modifying different sections of the plan at once; for example, updating the areas they personally are responsible for such that those estimates get integrated into the overall plan. Web-based tools, including extranets, generally fall into this category, but have the limitation that they can only be used when the user has live Internet access. To address this limitation, some software tools using client–server architecture provide a rich client that runs on users' desktop computer and replicates project and task information to other project team members through a central server when users connect periodically to the network. Some tools allow team members to check out their schedules (and others' as read only) to work on them while not on the network. When reconnecting to the database, all changes are synchronized with the other schedules.

=== Visual ===
A common problem in project management is a difficulty with both viewing and understanding large amounts of fluctuating project data. To tackle this, some project management software utilize information visualization, so that users can more easily find, analyze and make changes to their data. To avoid information overload, the visualization mantra of “overview first, zoom and filter, then details on demand” is often followed.

== See also ==
- Comparison of project management software
- Project management
- Project management information system
- Project portfolio management
