= Time limit =

Amount of time to complete a task

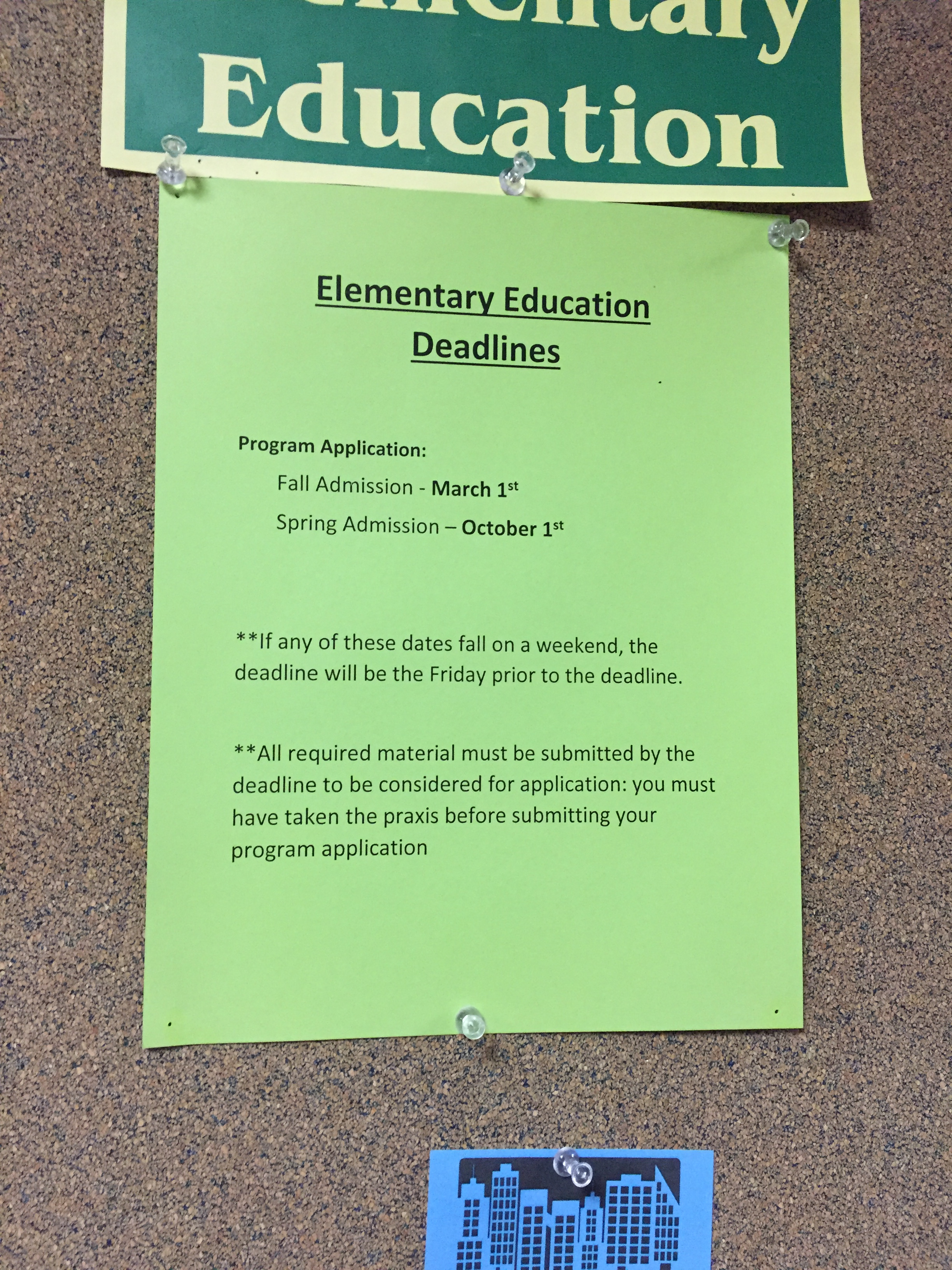
Deadlines announced on a school noticeboard in Orem, Utah

A time limit or deadline is a fixed point in time or a bounded time interval, by which a task or objective must be completed. Once that time has passed, the item may be considered overdue (for example, a work project or school assignment). In a professional context, missing a deadline can negatively affect an employee's performance evaluation, while in education, late submissions such as essays or reports may result in grade deductions.

In some cases, no materials can be submitted after the deadline. Examples include calls for proposal, commercial tenders for bids, the handling of court cases, and application dates for universities and professional schools. For tests and examinations in schools, universities and job competitions, once the time limit for the test is up, the test-takers must put down their pens or pencils and hand in their test.

In project management, deadlines are most often associated with milestones.

== Etymology ==
There is only indirect evidence that the term deadline in the sense of "due date" may be connected with the use of the term in prison camps during the American Civil War, when it referred to a physical line or boundary beyond which prisoners were shot. In fact, the term is no longer found in print by the end of the 19th century, but it soon resurfaces in writing in 1917 as a printing term for "a guideline on the bed of a printing press beyond which text will not print". Three years later, the term is found in print in the sense of "time limit" in the closely connected publishing industry, indicating the time after which material would not make it into a newspaper or periodical.
