= Critical path method =

Method of scheduling activities

PERT chart for a project with five milestones (10 through 50) and six activities (A through F). The project has two critical paths: activities B and C, or A, D, and F – giving a minimum project time of 7 months with fast tracking. Activity E is sub-critical, and has a float of 1 month.

The critical path method (CPM), or critical path analysis (CPA), is an algorithm for scheduling a set of project activities. A critical path is determined by identifying the longest stretch of dependent activities and measuring the time required to complete them from start to finish. It is commonly used in conjunction with the program evaluation and review technique (PERT).

== History ==
The CPM is a project-modeling technique developed in the late 1950s by Morgan R. Walker of DuPont and James E. Kelley Jr. of Remington Rand. Kelley and Walker related their memories of the development of CPM in 1989. Kelley attributed the term "critical path" to the developers of the PERT, which was developed at about the same time by Booz Allen Hamilton and the U.S. Navy. The precursors of what came to be known as critical path were developed and put into practice by DuPont between 1940 and 1943 and contributed to the success of the Manhattan Project.

Critical path analysis is commonly used with all forms of projects, including construction, aerospace and defense, software development, research projects, product development, engineering, and plant maintenance, among others. Any project with interdependent activities can apply this method of mathematical analysis. CPM was used for the first time in 1966 for the major skyscraper development of constructing the former World Trade Center Twin Towers in New York City. Although the original CPM program and approach is no longer used, the term is generally applied to any approach used to analyze a project network logic diagram.

== Basic techniques ==
=== Components ===
The essential technique for using CPM is to construct a model of the project that includes:

1. A list of all activities required to complete the project (typically categorized within a work breakdown structure)
2. The time (duration) that each activity will take to complete
3. The dependencies between the activities
4. Logical end points such as milestones or deliverable items

Using these values, CPM calculates the longest path of planned activities to logical end points or to the end of the project, and the earliest and latest that each activity can start and finish without making the project longer. This process determines which activities are "critical" (i.e., on the longest path) and which have no float/slack or "total float" zero (i.e., can not be delayed without making the project longer). In project management, a critical path is the sequence of project network activities that adds up to the longest overall duration, regardless of whether that longest duration has float or not. This determines the shortest time possible to complete the project. "Total float" (unused time) can occur within the critical path. For example, if a project is testing a solar panel and task 'B' requires 'sunrise', a scheduling constraint on the testing activity could be that it would not start until the scheduled time for sunrise. This might insert dead time (total float) into the schedule on the activities on that path prior to the sunrise due to needing to wait for this event. This path, with the constraint-generated total float, would actually make the path longer, with total float being part of the shortest possible duration for the overall project. In other words, individual tasks on the critical path prior to the constraint might be able to be delayed without elongating the critical path; this is the total float of that task, but the time added to the project duration by the constraint is actually critical path drag, the amount by which the project's duration is extended by each critical path activity and constraint.

A project can have several, parallel, near-critical paths, and some or all of the tasks could have free float and/or total float. An additional parallel path through the network with the total durations shorter than the critical path is called a subcritical or noncritical path. Activities on subcritical paths have no drag, as they are not extending the project's duration.

CPM analysis tools allow a user to select a logical end point in a project and quickly identify its longest series of dependent activities (its longest path). These tools can display the critical path (and near-critical path activities if desired) as a cascading waterfall that flows from the project's start (or current status date) to the selected logical end point.

=== Visualizing critical path schedule ===
Although the activity-on-arrow diagram (PERT chart) is still used in a few places, it has generally been superseded by the activity-on-node diagram, where each activity is shown as a box or node and the arrows represent the logical relationships going from predecessor to successor as shown here in the "Activity-on-node diagram".

Activity-on-node diagram showing critical path schedule, along with total float and critical path drag computations

In this diagram, Activities A, B, C, D, and E comprise the critical or longest path, while Activities F, G, and H are off the critical path with floats of 15 days, 5 days, and 20 days respectively. Whereas activities that are off the critical path have float and are therefore not delaying completion of the project, those on the critical path will usually have critical path drag, i.e., they delay project completion. The drag of a critical path activity can be computed using the following formula:

1. If a critical path activity has nothing in parallel, its drag is equal to its duration. Thus A and E have drags of 10 days and 20 days respectively.
2. If a critical path activity has another activity in parallel, its drag is equal to whichever is less: its duration or the total float of the parallel activity with the least total float. Thus since B and C are both parallel to F (float of 15) and H (float of 20), B has a duration of 20 and drag of 15 (equal to F's float), while C has a duration of only 5 days and thus drag of only 5. Activity D, with a duration of 10 days, is parallel to G (float of 5) and H (float of 20) and therefore its drag is equal to 5, the float of G.

These results, including the drag computations, allow managers to prioritize activities for the effective management of project, and to shorten the planned critical path of a project by pruning critical path activities, by "fast tracking" (i.e., performing more activities in parallel), and/or by "crashing the critical path" (i.e., shortening the durations of critical path activities by adding resources).

Critical path drag analysis has also been used to optimize schedules in processes outside of strict project-oriented contexts, such as to increase manufacturing throughput by using the technique and metrics to identify and alleviate delaying factors and thus reduce assembly lead time.

=== Crash duration ===
"Crash duration" is a term referring to the shortest possible time for which an activity can be scheduled. It can be achieved by shifting more resources towards the completion of that activity, resulting in decreased time spent and often a reduced quality of work, as the premium is set on speed. Crash duration is typically modeled as a linear relationship between cost and activity duration, but in many cases, a convex function or a step function is more applicable.

=== Expansion ===
Originally, the critical path method considered only logical dependencies between terminal elements. Since then, it has been expanded to allow for the inclusion of resources related to each activity, through processes called activity-based resource assignments and resource optimization techniques such as Resource Leveling and Resource smoothing. A resource-leveled schedule may include delays due to resource bottlenecks (i.e., unavailability of a resource at the required time), and may cause a previously shorter path to become the longest or most "resource critical" path while a resource-smoothed schedule avoids impacting the critical path by using only free and total float. A related concept is called the critical chain, which attempts to protect activity and project durations from unforeseen delays due to resource constraints.

Since project schedules change on a regular basis, CPM allows continuous monitoring of the schedule, which allows the project manager to track the critical activities, and alerts the project manager to the possibility that non-critical activities may be delayed beyond their total float, thus creating a new critical path and delaying project completion. In addition, the method can easily incorporate the concepts of stochastic predictions, using the PERT and event chain methodology.

=== Flexibility ===
A schedule generated using the critical path techniques often is not realized precisely, as estimations are used to calculate times: if one mistake is made, the results of the analysis may change. This could cause an upset in the implementation of a project if the estimates are blindly believed, and if changes are not addressed promptly. However, the structure of critical path analysis is such that the variance from the original schedule caused by any change can be measured, and its impact either ameliorated or adjusted for. Indeed, an important element of project postmortem analysis is the 'as built critical path' (ABCP), which analyzes the specific causes and impacts of changes between the planned schedule and eventual schedule as actually implemented.

== Usage ==
Critical path techniques are widely used in planning, managing and controlling the delivery of construction projects. A technique known as "as-built critical path analysis" can also be used to assess the causes of a delay in completing a project, especially where there may have been more than one delaying factor and liability needs to be established for compensation and damages purposes. However, the use of as-built CPA in a legal context has been criticised, for example in the Scottish court case of City Inn Ltd. v Shepherd Construction (2007), because of its susceptibility to easily-made errors which can "invalidate the entire analysis".

Independent consultancies such as HSE Contractors provide explanations and applications of CPM scheduling in modern construction projects.

Currently, there are several software solutions available in industry which use the CPM method of scheduling; see list of project management software. The method currently used by most project management software is based on a manual calculation approach developed by John Fondahl of Stanford University.

== In popular culture ==
- In Odds On, the first novel by Michael Crichton, robbers use a critical path computer program to help plan a heist.
- The Nome Trilogy (in the first book, Truckers) by Terry Pratchett mentions "something called critical path analysis" and says that it means "there's always something you should have done first."

== See also ==
- Critical chain project management – Method of planning and managing projects
- Gantt chart – Type of chart to show a project schedule
- Graphical Evaluation and Review Technique (GERT) – Project management tool
- Liebig's law of the minimum – Growth is limited by the scarcest resource
- List of project management software
- List of project management topics
- Main path analysis – Mathematical tool
- Program evaluation and review technique (PERT) – Statistical tool used in project management
- Project management – Practice of leading the work of a team to achieve goals and criteria at a specified time
- Project planning – Aspect of project management which uses schedules to plan and report progress
- Work breakdown structure – Deliverable-orientated breakdown of a project into smaller components
