= Project planning =

Aspect of project management which uses schedules to plan and report progress

Project planning is part of project management, which relates to the use of schedules such as Gantt charts to plan and subsequently report progress within the project environment. Project planning can be done manually or by the use of project management software.

== Description ==
Initially, the project scope is defined and the appropriate methods for completing the project are determined. Following this step, the durations for the various tasks necessary to complete the work are listed and grouped into a work breakdown structure. Project planning is often used to organize different areas of a project, including project plans, workloads and the management of teams and individuals. The logical dependencies between tasks are defined using an activity network diagram that enables identification of the critical path. Project planning is inherently uncertain as it must be done before the project is actually started. Therefore, the duration of the tasks is often estimated through a weighted average of optimistic, normal, and pessimistic cases. The critical chain method adds "buffers" in the planning to anticipate potential delays in project execution. Float or slack time in the schedule can be calculated using project management software. Then the necessary resources can be estimated and costs for each activity can be allocated to each resource, giving the total project cost. At this stage, the project schedule may be optimized to achieve the appropriate balance between resource usage and project duration to comply with the project objectives. Once established and agreed, the project schedule becomes what is known as the baseline schedule. Progress will be measured against the baseline schedule throughout the life of the project. Analyzing progress compared to the baseline schedule is known as earned value management.

The inputs of the project planning phase 2 include the project charter and the concept proposal. The outputs of the project planning phase include the project requirements, the project schedule, and the project management plan.

== See also ==
- Cost overrun
- Dependency structure matrix
- Enterprise resource planning
- Megaproject
- Operations research
- PRINCE2
- Product planning
- Project Management Institute
- Project plan
- Project slippage
- Project stakeholders
- Scope creep
