= Project =

Assignment planned to achieve a objective

A project is a type of assignment, typically involving research or design, that is carefully planned to achieve a specific objective.

An alternative view sees a project managerially as a sequence of events: a "set of interrelated tasks to be executed over a fixed period and within certain cost and other limitations".

A project may be a temporary (rather than a permanent) social system (work system), possibly staffed by teams (within or across organizations) to accomplish particular tasks under time constraints.

A project may form a part of wider programme management or function as an ad hoc system.

Open-source software "projects" or artists' musical "projects" (for example) may lack defined team-membership, precise planning or time-limited durations.

== Overview ==
Based on the Project Management Institute's definition, a project can be defined as a "temporary endeavor" aimed to drive changes in teams, organizations, or societies. The output of a project is normally a unique product, service, or result. Projects can be short-term or long-term.

=== Cancellation ===
Project cancellation is the termination of a project prior to its completion and generally includes the cessation of access to funding and other project resources. Project cancellation may result from cost overruns, schedule overruns, changes in budget, change or obviation of the goal of the project, political factors, or any combination of those and other factors. Contracts often stipulate the time and the manner in which a project may be cancelled.

Contracted projects typically have a specified end date, when the contract may or may not be renewed; nonrenewal often has the same effect as cancellation but carries different legal ramifications.

By measuring uncertainties in cost, schedule and expected benefits, including elements that are often viewed as intangible, project teams can detect the risk of overruns or shortfalls earlier in the lifecycle. Given that only a tiny fraction of projects, less than half of one percent are completed on time, on budget, and deliver their expected benefits, this measurable approach offers a way to improve forecasting accuracy, support informed decisions and reduce the likelihood of cancellation or value shortfall.

== Definitions ==
A project consists of a concrete and organized effort motivated by a perceived opportunity when facing a problem, a need, a desire or a source of discomfort (e.g., lack of proper ventilation in a building). It seeks the realization of a unique and innovative deliverable, such as a product, a service, a process, or in some cases, a scientific research. Each project has a beginning and an end, and as such is considered a closed dynamic system. It is developed along the 4 Ps of project management: Plan, Processes, People, and Power (e.g., line of authority). It is bound by the triple constraints that are calendar, costs and norms of quality, each of which can be determined and measured objectively along the project lifecycle. Some projects produce some level of formal documentation, the deliverables, and some impacts, which can be positive or negative.

Some projects are designated as "major projects" because of their scale and significance, while extremely large-scale construction and investment projects may be referred to as "megaprojects". In Canada, the Major Projects Office's role focusses on projects designated by the government as "national interest projects", while the UK's Major Projects Authority, which existed before 2016, covered "around 200 major projects with a total whole life cost approaching £500 billion".

== Specific uses ==
=== School and university ===
At schools, educational institutes and universities, a project is a research assignment - given to a student or group of students - which generally requires a larger amount of effort and more independent work than that involved in a normal essay assignment. It requires students to undertake their fact-finding and analysis, either from library/internet research or from gathering data empirically. The written report will typically contain sections on the project's inception, analysis, findings and conclusions.

=== Project management ===
In project management, a project consists of a temporary endeavor undertaken to create a unique product, service or result. Another definition is a management environment that is created for the purpose of delivering one or more business products according to a specified business case. Projects can also be seen as temporary organizations.

Project objectives define target status at the end of the project, reaching of which is considered necessary for the achievement of planned benefits. They can be formulated as SMART criteria: Projects are often guided by a steering group.

- Specific
- Measurable (or at least evaluable) achievement
- Achievable (recently Agreed to or Acceptable are used regularly as well)
- Realistic (given the current state of organizational resources)
- Time terminated (bounded)

The evaluation (measurement) occurs at the project closure. However, a continuous guard on the project progress should be kept by monitoring and evaluating.

=== Civil and military construction and industry infrastructure ===
In civil, military and industry (e.g. oil and gas) infrastructure, capital projects refer to activities to construct and install equipment, facilities and buildings. As these activities are temporary endeavors with clear start and end dates, the term "project" is applied. Because the results of these activities are typically long-standing infrastructure, with a life measured in years or decades, these projects are typically accounted for in financial accounting as capital expenditures, and thus they are termed "capital projects".

=== Computer software ===
In computer software, a project can consist of programs, configuration definitions and related data. For example, in Microsoft Visual Studio, a "solution" consists of projects and other definitions.

=== Corporate finance ===
In corporate finance, "project" is often used to refer new capital investments; these will span a spectrum of size and / or purpose (money making or cost saving). "Projects", then, are usually major strategic decisions (to enter new areas of business or new markets), or acquisitions of other firms, but may include new ventures within existing businesses or markets, or decisions that may change the way existing ventures are run.

=== State project ===
It can be defined as "a set of state policies and/or agencies unified around a particular issue or oppression". Therefore, these kinds of projects involve constant change and dynamism due to the social constructions that evolve among time. State projects have to adapt to the current moment. They are mostly community services based.

=== Infrastructure code ===
In the context of infrastructure code, a project is a collection of code used to build a discrete component of the system. There is no rule on how much a single project or its component can include.

== Types ==
Some analyses of project-oriented activity distinguish - using military-style terminology - between grandiose strategic projects and more trivial or component operational projects: tactical projects.

== Examples ==
- Human Genome Project, which mapped the human genome
- Manhattan Project, which developed the first nuclear weapon
- Polaris missile project: an ICBM control-system
- Apollo program, which landed humans on the Moon
- Soviet atomic bomb project
- Soviet crewed lunar programs
- Project-706
- Great Pyramid of Giza
- SDGs

== Topics associated with projects ==
- Megaproject
- Program management
- Project governance
- Software project management
- Project Management Institute (PMI)
- International Project Management Association (IPMA)
- Project management software
- Project planning
- Small-scale project management
- PRINCE2
