= Float (project management) =

Amount of slack time in a project

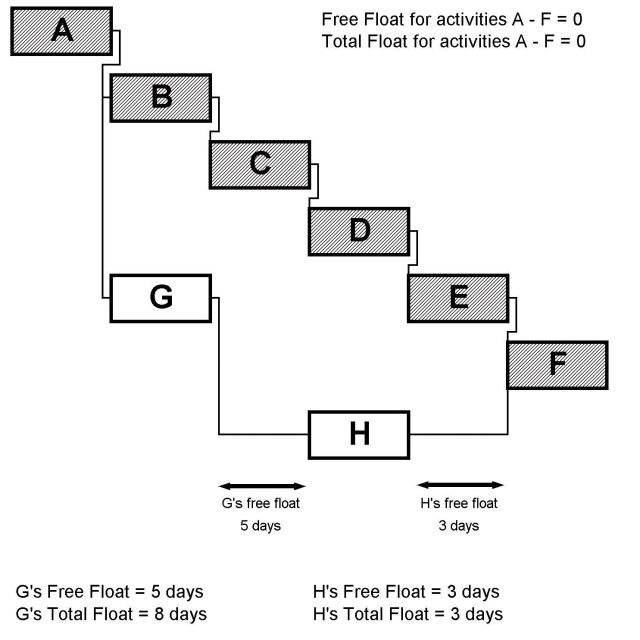
Example of float in a project. Although tasks A-F have no float, tasks G and H (which F depend on, but which only depend on A) have some degree of float.

In project management, float or slack is the amount of time that a task in a project network can be delayed without causing a delay to:

- subsequent tasks ("free float")
- project completion date ("total float").

Total float is associated with the path. If a project network chart/diagram has 4 non-critical paths, then that project would have 4 total float values. The total float of a path is the combined free float values of all activities in a path.

The total float represents the schedule flexibility and can also be measured by subtracting early start dates from late start dates of path completion. Float is core to critical path method, with the total floats of noncritical activities key to computing the critical path drag of an activity, i.e., the amount of time it is adding to the project's duration.

== Example ==
Consider the process of replacing a broken pane of glass in the window of your home. There are various component activities involved in the project as a whole; obtaining the glass and putty, installing the new glass, choosing the paint, obtaining a tin once it has set, wiping the new glass free of finger smears etc.

Some of these activities can run concurrently e.g. obtaining the glass, obtaining the putty, choosing the paint etc., while others are consecutive e.g. the paint cannot be bought until it has been chosen, the new window cannot be painted until the window is installed and the new putty has set. Delaying the acquisition of the glass is likely to delay the entire project - this activity will be on the critical path and have no float, of any sort, attached to it and hence it is a 'critical activity'. A relatively short delay in the purchase of the paint may not automatically hold up the entire project as there is still some waiting time for the new putty to dry before it can be painted anyway - there will be some 'free float' attached to the activity of purchasing the paint and hence it is not a critical activity. However, a delay in choosing the paint, in turn, inevitably delays buying the paint which, although it may not subsequently mean any delay to the entire project, does mean that choosing the paint has no 'free float' attached to it - despite having no free float of its own, the choosing of the paint is involved with a path through the network which does have 'total float'.

== See also ==
- Critical path method
- Glossary of project management
- List of project management topics
