= Index of articles related to the theory of constraints =

This is a list of topics related to the theory of constraints.

== B ==
- Bottleneck (production)

This is a resource that has enough capacity or more capacity when needed to satisfy the demand placed upon it. Bottlenecks need not be taken into account when scheduling.

== C ==
- Causality

== E ==
- Eliyahu M. Goldratt
- Evaporating Cloud
- Event chain methodology

== F ==
- Failure mode and effects analysis (FMEA)
- Focused improvement
- Future Reality Tree

== G ==
- Game theory
- The Goal (novel)
- Goldratt, Eliyahu M.

== I ==
- It's Not Luck (novel)

== L ==
- Lean Construction

== M ==
- Meadows, Donella Twelve leverage points - protocols to intervene in a system

== N ==
- Necessary and sufficient conditions
- Necessary But Not Sufficient (novel)

== P ==
- POOGI
- Prerequisite Tree
- Project Management

== R ==
- Reengineering
- Reverse hierarchy

== S ==
- Strategy & Tactics (TOC)

== T ==
- Thinking processes
- Throughput (business)
- Throughput
- Total quality management
- Transition Tree
- Twelve leverage points

== See also ==
- Business philosophies and popular management theories
- List of management topics
- List of project management topics
- Management
