= It's Not Luck =

Novel by Eliyahu Goldratt

- Front Cover
- Author: Eliyahu M. Goldratt
- Language: English
- Publisher: North River Press
- Publication date: 1994
- Media type: Softcover
- Pages: 283
- ISBN: 0-88427-115-3
- OCLC: 31443609
- Preceded by: The Goal
- Followed by: Critical Chain and Necessary But Not Sufficient

It's Not Luck (1994) is a business novel and a sequel to The Goal. Set several years after, the plot continues to follow the advancement of the main character, Alex Rogo, through the corporate ranks of large manufacturer, UniCo.

Author Eliyahu M. Goldratt, a business consultant known for his theory of constraints (TOC), continues to teach the reader his thinking processes through the eyes of Alex Rogo as he learns from his mentor, Jonah. In this book, the primary subjects are the resolution of conflict through the evaporating clouds method and the identification of root causes through the effect-cause-effect method.

== Synopsis ==
In this book the main character, Alex, conducts the reader through the essence of some TOC tools and applications, like the Thinking Processes and the TOC solutions for Marketing, Distribution and how to compose the Strategy of a company.

Alex Rogo, the new executive vice president of UniCo (which is in need of money), must turn around three newly acquired companies, knowing that if he succeeds, they will be sold off and the new owners will replace him, and if he fails, the companies will be closed - in either case, he will likely be fired. Using what he learned from Jonah, Alex manages to turn the companies around - two are sold, with UniCo keeping one due to it now being so profitable. The book ends with Alex set to become CEO.

== Characters ==
- Alex Rogo - Main character, and executive vice president of UniCo
- Stacey Kaufmann and Bob Donovan - Alex's friends from the previous books, and directors of two of the companies
- Brandon and Jim - Shareholders in UniCo, they come to respect Alex and his methods
