= Necessary But Not Sufficient (novel) =

2000 novel about business management

- Author: Eliyahu M. Goldratt
- Language: English
- Publisher: North River Press
- Publication date: 2000
- Media type: Softcover
- Preceded by: Critical Chain

Necessary But Not Sufficient is a 2000 novel authored by Eliyahu Goldratt with co-authors Eli Schrangenheim and Carol A. Ptak. Necessary But Not Sufficient is written as a "business novel" and shows the fictional application of the theory of constraints to enterprise resource planning (ERP) and operations software and organizations using that software. The fourth of five published Goldratt business novels, this one does not share any of the settings or characters of the previous three novels (only The Goal and It's Not Luck shared the same characters).

== Editions ==
- ISBN 0-88427-170-6
