= Theory of Constraints in streamline manufacturing =

Theory of constraints (TOC) is an engineering management technique used to evaluate a manageable procedure, identifying the largest constraint (bottleneck) and strategizing to reduce task time and maximise profit. It assists in determining what to change, when to change it, and how to cause the change. The theory was established by Dr. Eliyahu Goldratt through his 1984 bestselling novel The Goal. Since this time, TOC has continued to develop and evolve and is a primary management tool in the engineering industry. When Applying TOC, powerful tools are used to determine the constraint and reduce its effect on the procedure, including:

- The Five Focusing Steps
- The Thinking Process
- Throughput Accounting

Although still limited by varying factors, time factors and human identification, TOC is the ideal engineering solution to increasing profit and reducing idle time in a production through its elimination of 'the weak link.'

== History ==
Theory of Constraints is a method to determine a procedure in a sequence of procedures which has the greatest negative effect on the production line. The theory was first derived by Dr Eliyahu Goldratt through his 1984 bestselling novel, 'The Goal.' Dr Goldratt was a well-regarded educator in the construction industry, being sought after by many large companies. In the mid 1990s, Goldratt in 2000, established Goldratt's Marketing Group to further enhance the TOC knowledge to those interested. Goldratt's Marketing Group was established to further enhance the knowledge of businesses in product production, suppliers and distributors, project managers and retail workers, further develop the quality of decision-making, improving communication and stimulating new solutions.

The theory operates with the assumption that every process has at least one influencing constraint, of which must be improved for the process to become more economic. Time spent trying to maximise processes which are not considered the bottleneck will not provide any benefits to the system. Attempting to reduce the influencing factor the bottleneck has on the entire system, will further the 'goal.' The procedure of reducing the influencing factor the bottleneck has on the system, continues as one bottleneck is minimised the attention turns to the new largest hindering procedure.

== Bottleneck ==
In streamline manufacturing, the bottleneck is the station of a production line where greatest limiting factor lies. It is generally the station with the greatest amount of work in process at the work station. Bottlenecks often result in slow production times, surplus of raw material and low employee morale.

Nearly every manufacturing system initially has a bottleneck. It is critical to be able to determine the procedure in the production line which is the limiting factor. Generally the station which has accumulated the largest amount of WIP can be considered the Bottleneck, however other engineering management techniques can be applied to determine the bottle neck.

== Application ==
There are several practiced techniques applied to streamline manufacturing to reduce and or eliminate the constraining factor in the system. The methods applied to the systems all are designed to isolate the constraint, break it down into its components and find a suitable solution to reducing the negative impact the station has on the entire system. The thinking processes as well as the identification of the bottleneck is conducted in different manners. The four most common practiced techniques include; Five Focusing Steps, Thinking Process, Throughput Accounting and the Drum-Buffer-Effect.

=== Five Focusing Steps ===
The five focusing steps of TOC is an ideal approach to identifying the bottleneck and the correct procedure to reduce the impact keeping in mind the 'goal.' The five focusing steps are:

1. Identify the Constraint
2. Exploit the Constraint
3. Subordinate the Constraint
4. Elevate the Constraint
5. Repeat the Process

==== Identify the Constraint ====
The first step is to determine which process in the system is increasing the procedures overall throughput. Indicators of the bottleneck in the system will have accumulated a large amount of work in progress (WIP) and will have a higher average cycle time.

==== Exploit the Constraint ====
Exploiting the constraint is the procedure of quickly improving the current bottleneck with minimal disruption to the production line. Common rapid relief techniques include:

- Inventory buffers
- Quality check
- Continuous operation
- Schedule around bottleneck
- Offload constraint work

Improvements in these fields will have a quick solution to improvement of the constraint which will result in improved throughput

==== Subordinate to the Constraint ====
This step focuses on techniques to mitigate impact from upstream or downstream processes which may further delay the operations of the bottleneck. Techniques include:

- Drum-Buffer-Rope
- Subordinate maintenance
- Added sprint capacity
- Operations pace

==== Elevate the Constraint ====
In this step, actions are taken to break the constraints by the implementation of larger changes to improve the bottleneck. These changes usually include a large investment of time and or money. Techniques used include:

- Use of performance data
- Single-Minute Exchange of Die (SMED) program
- Design improvements
- Purchase additional equipment/staff

==== Repeat the Process ====
Once the initial steps of the Five Focusing Steps have been executed, the bottleneck of focus should no longer be the hindering process of the system. The implementation of the Five Focusing Steps is not used for one off improvement but for continuous improvements to the process. If the bottleneck has been broken, the next step is to repeat the focusing steps for the new bottleneck. If the bottleneck has not been broken, a new approach needs to be taken, including verifying that the investigated constraint has correctly been identified as the bottleneck.

=== Thinking Process ===
The thinking process in TOC, are tools used to determine, and fix a problem in a system. In streamline processing it is a fundamental approach to always be striving to improve processes, eliminate bottlenecks and reduce manufacturing time. A common approach is to answer the following questions:

- What should I change?
- What should It change to?
- How to cause the change?

Asking these questions when faced with a problem in a production line, will offer a range of solutions simultaneously to improve the current situation. The thinking process allows a smooth transition through the layers of the process to be able to adapt a more suitable method to improve the manufacturing system.

=== Throughput Accounting ===
Throughput accounting (TA) is a simple management accounting technique providing managers with information support to make profitable decisions for their system. It is an alternative method to traditional cost accounting, in which limiting factors in a system are identified and simple solutions are adapted to move towards reaching the businesses goal. The actions of throughput accounting maximize the net profit from a system in the shortest amount of time, with limited resources and limited expenditures.

Throughput accounting uses through methods in dealing with income and expenses in a system

Throughput (T) is the rate at which a system can produce a unit. For profit orientated systems, throughput is considered net sales (S) minus totally variable cost (TVC).

Investment (I) is the monetary value of the system. The value of inventory, buildings, machines and other assets are considered investments.

Operating expenses (OE) is the cost of the supply chain operating to produce the unit. For a system manufacturing a physical item, the operating expense is the investment cost minus the cost of raw materials but including the cost of maintenance, rent and taxes.

== Constraints and Limitations ==
A key process in TOC is the identification of the limiting factor in a production system to ultimately improve the production of units. A major limitation in the theory is that of identifying the station which is in fact the limiting procedure.

=== Identification ===
It is not uncommon that when applying TOC the wrong work station is being examined as the limiting station when, however this station may only be the bottleneck due to another constraining factor not being focused on. This limitation theory, may encourage the waste of resources and times on a station which may in fact not require optimizing.

=== Variation ===
Another limitation of the theory is the lack of consideration towards varying factors. Factors such as demand for a product are not directly examined when TOC is applied. If the market demand for a product is varying, the use of resources to improve the situation may be better used expanding production capacity.

=== Time ===
Time is an influential constraint when applying TOC. The theory does not consider the current time frame for the production system and the duration of the demand for the product. The theory limits itself to short-term effects on the system rather than forecasting for the future. Overcoming this constraint means examining the long-term effects of work done to improve the constraint. If findings in a short-term analysis seem to repeat they can be considered as long-term effects, therefore implementing changes may be appropriate.
