= Negative branch reservations =

Negative branch reservations is a cause and effect analysis of a situation from Eliyahu Goldratt's Theory of Constraints. This thinking skill is used to map out what can go wrong in a process of change and help to anticipate any negative outcomes.

The technique is used together with the other thinking-process tools, in particular the future reality tree, the transition tree and the prerequisite tree.
