= Critical chain project management =

Method of planning and managing projects

Critical chain project management (CCPM) is a method of planning and managing projects that emphasizes the resources (people, equipment, physical space) required to execute project tasks. It was developed by Eliyahu M. Goldratt. It differs from more traditional methods that derive from critical path and PERT algorithms, which emphasize task order and rigid scheduling. A critical chain project network strives to keep resources levelled, and requires that they be flexible in start times.

== Origins ==
Critical chain project management is based on methods and algorithms derived from the theory of constraints. The idea of CCPM was introduced in 1997 in Eliyahu M. Goldratt's book, Critical Chain. The application of CCPM has been credited with achieving projects 10% to 50% faster and/or cheaper than the traditional methods (i.e., CPM, PERT, Gantt, etc.) developed from 1910 to 1950s.

According to studies of traditional project management methods by Standish Group and others as of 1998, only 44% of projects typically finish on time. Projects typically complete at 222% of the duration originally planned, 189% of the original budgeted cost, 70% of projects fall short of their planned scope (technical content delivered), and 30% are cancelled before completion. CCPM tries to improve performance relative to these traditional statistics.

== Details ==
With traditional project management methods, 30% of lost time and resources are typically consumed by wasteful techniques such as bad multitasking (in particular task switching), student syndrome, Parkinson's law, in-box delays, and lack of prioritization.

In a project plan, the critical chain is the sequence of both precedence- and resource-dependent tasks that prevents a project from being completed in a shorter time, given finite resources. If resources are always available in unlimited quantities, then a project's critical chain is identical to its critical path method.

Critical chain is an alternative to critical path analysis. Main features that distinguish critical chain from critical path are:

1. Use of (often implicit) resource dependencies. Implicit means that they are not included in the project network, but must be identified by looking at the resource requirements.
2. Lack of search for an optimum solution—a "good enough" solution is enough because:
  1. As far as is known, there is no analytical method for finding an absolute optimum (i.e., having the overall shortest critical chain).
  2. The inherent uncertainty in estimates is much greater than the difference between the optimum and near-optimum ("good enough" solutions).
3. Identification and insertion of buffers:
  - Project buffer
  - Feeding buffers
  - Resource buffers (companies are usually reluctant to give more resources)
4. Monitoring project progress and health by monitoring the consumption rate of the buffers rather than individual task performance to schedule.

CCPM planning aggregates the large amounts of safety time added to tasks within a project into the buffers—to protect the due-date performance and avoid wasting this safety time through bad multitasking, student syndrome, Parkinson's Law, and poorly synchronized integration.

Critical chain project management uses buffer management instead of earned value management to assess the performance of a project. Some project managers feel that the earned value management technique is misleading, because it does not distinguish progress on the project constraint (i.e., on the critical chain) from progress on non-constraints (i.e., on other paths). Event chain methodology can determine the size of the project, feeding, and resource buffers.

=== Planning ===
A project plan or work breakdown structure is created in much the same fashion as with critical path. The plan is worked backward from a completion date with each task starting as late as possible.

A duration is assigned to each task. Some software implementations add a second duration: one a "best guess", or 50% probability duration, and a second "safe" duration, which should have higher probability of completion (perhaps 90% or 95%, depending on the amount of risk that the organization can accept). Other software implementations go through the duration estimate of every task and remove a fixed percentage to be aggregated into the buffers.

Resources are assigned to each task, and the plan is resource leveled, using the aggressive durations. The longest sequence of resource-leveled tasks that lead from beginning to end of the project is then identified as the critical chain. The justification for using the 50% estimates is that half of the tasks will finish early and half will finish late, so that the variance over the course of the project should be zero.

Recognizing that tasks are more likely to take more time than less time due to Parkinson's law, Student syndrome, or other reasons, CCPM uses "buffers" to monitor project schedule and financial performance. The "extra" duration of each task on the critical chain—the difference between the "safe" durations and the 50% durations—is gathered in a buffer at the end of the project. In the same way, buffers are gathered at the end of each sequence of tasks that feed into the critical chain. The date at the end of the project buffer is given to external stakeholders as the delivery date. Finally, a baseline is established, which enables financial monitoring of the project.

An alternate duration-estimation methodology uses probability-based quantification of duration using Monte Carlo simulation. In 1999, Hoel and Taylor applied simulation to assess the impact of risks associated with each component of project work breakdown structure on project duration, cost and performance. Using Monte Carlo simulation, the project manager can apply different probabilities for various risk factors that affect a project component. The probability of occurrence can vary from 0% to 100% chance of occurrence. The impact of risk is entered into the simulation model along with the probability of occurrence. The number of iterations of Monte Carlo simulation depend on the tolerance level of error and provide a density graph illustrating the overall probability of risk impact on project outcome.

=== Execution ===
When the plan is complete and the project is ready to start, the project network is fixed and the buffers' sizes are "locked" (i.e., their planned duration may not be altered during the project), because they are used to monitor project schedule and financial performance.

With no slack in the duration of individual tasks, resources are encouraged to focus on the task at hand to complete it and hand it off to the next person or group. The objective here is to eliminate bad multitasking. This is done by providing priority information to all resources. The literature draws an analogy with a relay race. Each element on the project is encouraged to move as quickly as they can: when they are running their "leg" of the project, they should be focused on completing the assigned task as quickly as possible, with minimization of distractions and multitasking. In some case studies, actual batons are reportedly hung by the desks of people when they are working on critical chain tasks so that others know not to interrupt. The goal, here, is to overcome the tendency to delay work or to do extra work when there seems to be time. The CCPM literature contrasts this with "traditional" project management that monitors task start and completion dates. CCPM encourages people to move as quickly as possible, regardless of dates.

Because task duration has been planned at the 50% probability duration, there is pressure on resources to complete critical chain tasks as quickly as possible, overcoming student's syndrome and Parkinson's Law.

=== Monitoring ===
According to proponents, monitoring is, in some ways, the greatest advantage of the critical chain method. Because individual tasks vary in duration from the 50% estimate, there is no point in trying to force every task to complete "on time"; estimates can never be perfect. Instead, we monitor the buffers created during the planning stage. A fever chart or similar graph can be created and posted to show the consumption of buffer as a function of project completion. If the rate of buffer consumption is low, the project is on target. If the rate of consumption is such that there is likely to be little or no buffer at the end of the project, then corrective actions or recovery plans must be developed to recover the loss. When the buffer consumption rate exceeds some critical value (roughly: the rate where all of the buffer may be expected to be consumed before the end of the project, resulting in late completion), then those alternative plans need to be implemented.
