= Overall labor effectiveness =

Key performance indicator

Overall labor effectiveness (OLE) is a key performance indicator (KPI) that measures the utilization, performance, and quality of the workforce and its impact on productivity.

Similar to overall equipment effectiveness (OEE), OLE measures availability, performance, and quality.

- Availability – the percentage of time employees spend making effective contributions
- Performance – the amount of product delivered
- Quality – the percentage of perfect or saleable product produced

OLE allows manufacturers to make operational decisions by giving them the ability to analyze the cumulative effect of these three workforce factors on productive output, while considering the impact of both direct and indirect labor.
OLE supports Lean and Six Sigma methodologies and applies them to workforce processes, allowing manufacturers to make labor-related activities more efficient, repeatable and impactful.

== Measuring availability ==
There are many factors that influence workforce availability and therefore the potential output of equipment and the manufacturing plant. OLE can help manufacturers be sure that they have the person with the right skills available at the right time by enabling manufacturers to locate areas where providing and scheduling the right mix of employees can increase the number of productive hours. OLE also accounts for labor utilization. Understanding where downtime losses are coming from and the impact they have on production can reveal root causes—which can include machine downtime, material delays, or absenteeism—that delay a line startup.

Calculation: Availability = Time operators are working productively / Time scheduled
Example:
Two employees (workforce) are scheduled to work 8 hour (480 minutes) shifts.
The normal shift includes a scheduled 30 minute break.
The employees experience 60 minutes of unscheduled downtime.
Scheduled Time = 960 min − 60 min break = 900 Min
Available Time = 900 min Scheduled − 120 min Unscheduled Downtime = 780 Min
Availability = 780 Avail Min / 900 Scheduled Min = 86.67%

== Measuring performance ==
When employees cannot perform their work within standard times, performance can suffer. Effective training can increase performance by improving the skills that directly impact the quality of output. A skilled operator knows how to measure work, understands the impacts of variability, and knows to stop production for corrective actions when quality falls below specified limits. Accurately measuring this metric with OLE can pinpoint performance improvement opportunities down to the individual level.

Calculation: Performance = Actual output of the operators / the expected output (or labor standard)
Example:
Two employees (workforce) are scheduled to work an 8-hour (480 minute) shift with a 30-minute scheduled break.
Available Time = 960 min − 60 min break − 120 min Unscheduled Downtime = 780 Min

The Standard Rate for the part being produced is 60 Units/Hour or 1 Minute/Unit
The Workforce produces 700 Total Units during the shift.
Time to Produce Parts = 700 Units * 1 Minutes/Unit = 700 Minutes
Performance = 700 minutes / 780 minutes = 89.74 %

== Measuring quality ==
A number of drivers contribute to quality, but the effort to improve quality can result in a lowering of labor performance. When making the correlation between the workforce and quality it is important to consider factors such as the training and skills of employees, whether they have access to the right tools to follow procedures, and their understanding of how their roles drive and impact quality. OLE can help manufacturers analyze shift productivity down to a single-shift level, and determine which individual workers are most productive, and then identify corrective actions to bring operations up to standards.

Calculation: Quality = Saleable parts / Total parts produced
Example:
Two employees (workforce) produce 670 Good Units during a shift.
700 Units were started in order to produce the 670 Good Units.
Quality = 670 Good Units / 700 Units Started = 95.71%

== Calculation ==
Effective use of OLE uncovers the data that fuels root-cause analysis and points to corrective actions. Likewise, OLE exposes trends that can be used to diagnose more subtle problems. It also helps managers understand whether corrective actions did, in fact, solve problems and improve overall productivity.

Example:
Calculation: OLE = Availability x Performance x Quality
Example:
A workforce experiences...
Availability of 87%
The Work Center Performance is 89.74%.
Work Center Quality is 96%.
OLE = 86.67% Availability x 89.74% Performance x 95.71% Quality = 74.44%

== Labor information tracked ==
The following table provides examples of the labor information tracked by overall labor effectiveness organized by its major categories. Using this labor information, manufacturers can make operational decisions to improve the cumulative effect of labor availability, performance, and quality.

OLE Category	Major Loss Category	Example of Loss
Availability Availability is the ratio of time the operators are working productively divided by the amount of time the operators were scheduled.	Breakdown Changeover	Lack of training and experience Unplanned absenteeism Maintenance mechanics delayed Poorly scheduled breaks and lunches Material handlers starved the machine Set-up personnel shortages or delays Lack of training, skills and experience
Performance Performance is the ratio of the actual output of the operators divided by the expected output (or labor standard).	Reduced Speed Small stops	Operator inefficiency due to lack of skills, experience or training Poor operator technique due to lack of skills, experience or training
Quality Quality has many definitions, but a common one is the ratio of saleable parts divided by the total parts produced.	Scrap or rework Yield or start-up losses	Operator error Set-up team error Maintenance mechanic error Set-up team error Maintenance mechanic error Operator error

== See also ==
- Lean Six Sigma
- Process-centered design
- Total productive maintenance
