= Focused improvement =

Focused improvement in the theory of constraints is an ensemble of activities aimed at elevating the performance of any system, especially a business system, with respect to its goal by eliminating its constraints one by one and by not working on non-constraints.

Focused improvement can also be defined in simpler terms as a process that identifies the systems problems and then modifies the whole system in order to find the most cost effective, time saving and least disruptive solutions in order to optimize the system.

"Focused Improvement is the process of applying systematic problem solving methods to manufacturing. The process relies on aligning the correct method to the correct scenario".

== Development and Apparition ==
Focused improvement was developed as a working part of the Theory of Constraints management philosophy by Eliyahu M. Goldratt in his 1984 book titled The Goal, that is geared to help organizations continually achieve their goals. Unlike other popular performance improvement methods, such as TQM or reengineering, F.I. focuses on solving real life problems and not on increasing the costs and distractions for the management's attention.

== Focused improvement V.S. Total Quality Management (TQM) ==
No general agreement has been reached about the characteristics of F.I. or TQM but to some extent we can observe similar traits in implementations of these processes.

=== Traits of Focused improvement ===
1. Identify the system's constraint(s).
2. Decide how to exploit the system's constraint(s).
3. Subordinate everything else to the above decision(s).
4. Elevate the system's constraint(s).
5. Communicate the new approach and move to the next improvement

=== Traits of TQM ===
1. "Quality is defined by customers' requirements."
2. "Top management has direct responsibility for quality improvement."
3. "Increased quality comes from systematic analysis and improvement of work processes."
4. "Quality improvement is a continuous effort and conducted throughout the organization."

These two philosophies have the same main goal but they go about achieving it two different ways. The FI delivers short term results that can be translated into long term success if the process is repeated correctly without allowing it to lose momentum. The TQM has at its base client satisfaction but it only yields long term results. When choosing one of these two processes management has to take into account what are the company needs.

== Uses and potential ==
Products that are based on embedded computer systems has seen a rapid increase. During this time the features that are controlled or supported by software systems that are embedded have suffered an increase in their role becoming crucial. All these developments make it necessary to create and innovate new approaches for software process improvement that focus on improving specific product traits.

Focused improvement can be used not only in business systems but in any type of system be it healthcare, education, waste management, space exploration systems (NASA, etc.).

== Functioning principles ==
The FI is based on the Five Thinking Processes that enable it to work in any cognitive system. The working principle of the five thinking processes is represented by the users ability to answer the following questions:

1. What to change?
2. What to change it into?
3. How to cause the change?
4. Why Change?
5. How to maintain the process of ongoing improvement ?

If all questions have an answer then the Focused improvement can be applied with relative ease

== Useful quotes ==
"Focused improvement includes all activities that maximize the overall effectiveness of equipment, processes, and plants through uncompromising elimination of losses* and improvement of performance."

The objective of Focused Improvement is to assure that the equipment maintains a peak performance all the time.

"The fact is machines do virtually 100 percent of the product manufacturing work. The only thing we people do, whether we’re operators, technicians, engineers, or managers, is to tend to the needs of the machines in one way or another. The better our machines run, the more productive our shop floor, and the more successful our business."

The driving concept behind Focused Improvement is bringing your losses as close to zero as possible.

"Maximizing equipment effectiveness requires the complete elimination of failures, defects, and other negative phenomena – in other words, the wastes and losses incurred in equipment operation."
