= Limiting factor =

Bottleneck variable limiting the evolution of a system

A limiting factor is a variable of a system that restricts the growth or continuation of processes within a system, typically through its exhaustion.

== Overview ==
The identification of a factor as limiting is possible only in distinction to one or more other factors that are non-limiting. Disciplines differ in their use of the term as to whether they allow the simultaneous existence of more than one limiting factor (which may then be called "co-limiting"), but they all require the existence of at least one non-limiting factor when the terms are used. There are several different possible scenarios of limitation when more than one factor is present. The first scenario, called single limitation occurs when only one factor, the one with maximum demand, limits the System. Serial co-limitation is when one factor has no direct limiting effects on the system, but must be present to increase the limitation of a second factor. A third scenario, independent limitation, occurs when two factors both have limiting effects on the system but work through different mechanisms. Another scenario, synergistic limitation, occurs when both factors contribute to the same limitation mechanism, but in different ways.

In 1905 Frederick Blackman articulated the role of limiting factors as follows: "When a process is conditioned as to its rapidity by several separate factors the rate of the process is limited by the pace of the slowest factor." In terms of the magnitude of a function, he wrote, "When the magnitude of a function is limited by one of a set of possible factors, increase of that factor, and of that one alone, will be found to bring about an increase of the magnitude of the function." Application of the notion of limiting factors to agriculture in the nineteenth century was the work of Carl Sprengel and Justus von Liebig. The concept was then formalized as the law of the minimum.

== Ecology ==
Limiting factors in ecology figure

In population ecology, a regulating factor, also known as a limiting factor, is something that keeps a population at equilibrium (neither increasing nor decreasing in size over time). Common limiting factor resources are environmental features that limit the growth, abundance, or distribution of an organism or a population of organisms in an ecosystem. The concept of limiting factors is based on Liebig's Law of the Minimum, which states that growth is controlled not by the total amount of resources available, but by the scarcest resource. In other words, a factor is limiting if a change in the factor produces increased growth, abundance, or distribution of an organism when other factors necessary to the organism's life do not. Limiting factors may be physical or biological.

Limiting factors are not limited to the condition of the species. Some factors may be increased or reduced based on circumstances. An example of a limiting factor is sunlight in the rain forest, where growth is limited to all plants on the forest floor unless more light becomes available. This decreases the number of potential factors that could influence a biological process, but only one is in effect at any one place and time. This recognition that there is always a single limiting factor is vital in ecology, and the concept has parallels in numerous other processes. The limiting factor also causes competition between individuals of a species population. For example, space is a limiting factor. Many predators and prey need a certain amount of space for survival: food, water, and other biological needs. If the population of a species is too high, they start competing for those needs. Thus the limiting factors hold down population in an area by causing some individuals to seek better prospects elsewhere and others to stay and starve. Some other limiting factors in biology include temperature and other weather related factors. Species can also be limited by the availability of macro- and micronutrients. There has even been evidence of co-limitation in prairie ecosystems. A study published in 2017 showed that sodium (a micronutrient) had no effect on its own, but when in combination with nitrogen and phosphorus (macronutrients), it did show positive effects, which is evidence of serial co-limitation.

== Oceanography ==
In oceanography, a prime example of a limiting factor is a limiting nutrient. Nutrient availability in freshwater and marine environments plays a critical role in determining what organisms survive and thrive. Nutrients are the building blocks of all living organisms, as they support biological activity. They are required to make proteins, DNA, membranes, organelles, and exoskeletons. The major elements that constitute >95% of organic matter mass are carbon, hydrogen, nitrogen, oxygen, sulfur, and phosphorus. Minor elements are iron, manganese, cobalt, zinc and copper. These minor elements are often only present in trace amounts but they are key as co-limiting factors as parts of enzymes, transporters, vitamins and amino acids. Within aquatic environments, nitrogen and phosphorus are leading contenders for most limiting nutrients.

Discovery of the Redfield ratio was a major insight that helped understand the relationship between nutrient availability in seawater and their relative abundance in organisms. Redfield was able to notice elemental consistencies between carbon, nitrogen and phosphorus when looking at larger organisms living in the ocean (C:N:P = 106:16:1). He also observed consistencies in nutrients within the water column; nitrate to phosphate ratio was 16:1. The overarching idea was that the environment fundamentally influences the organisms that grow in it and the growing organisms fundamentally influence the environment. Redfield's opening statement in his 1934 paper explains "It is now well recognized that the growth of plankton in the surface layers of the sea is limited in part by the quantities of phosphate and nitrate available for their use and that the changes in the relative quantities of certain substances in seawater are determined in their relative proportions by biological activity". Deviations from Redfield can be used to infer elemental limitations. Limiting nutrients can be discussed in terms of dissolved nutrients, suspended particles and sinking particles, among others. When discussing dissolved nutrient stoichiometry, large deviations from the original Redfield ratio can determine if an environment is phosphorus limited or nitrogen limited. When discussing suspended particle stoichiometry, higher N:P ratios are noted in oligotrophic waters (environments dominated by cyanobacteria; low latitudes/equator) and lower N:P ratios are noted in nutrient rich ecosystems (environments dominated by diatoms; high latitudes/poles).

Many areas are severely nitrogen limited, but phosphorus limitation has also been observed. In many instances trace metals or co-limitation occur. Co-limitations refer to where two or more nutrients simultaneously limit a process. Pinpointing a single limiting factor can be challenging, as nutrient demand varies between organisms, life cycles, and environmental conditions (e.g. thermal stress can increase demand on nutrients for biological repairs).

== Business and technology ==
AllBusiness.com defines a limiting (constraining) factor as an "item that restricts or limits production or sale of a given product". The examples provided include: "limited machine hours and labor-hours and shortage of materials and skilled labor. Other limiting factors may be cubic feet of display or warehouse space, or working capital." The term is also frequently used in technology literature.

The analysis of limiting business factors is part of the program evaluation and review technique, critical path analysis, and theory of constraints as presented in The Goal.

== Chemistry ==
In stoichiometry of a chemical reaction to produce a chemical product, it may be observed or predicted that with amounts supplied in specified proportions, one of the reactants will be consumed by the reaction before the others. The supply of this reagent thus limits the amount of product. This limiting reagent determines the theoretical yield of the reaction. The other reactants are said to be non-limiting or in excess. This distinction makes sense only when the chemical equilibrium so favors the products to cause the complete consumption of one of the reactants.

In studies of reaction kinetics, the rate of progress of the reaction may be limited by the concentration of one of the reactants or catalyst. In multi-step reactions, a step may be rate-limiting in terms of the production of the final product. In vivo, in an organism or an ecologic system, such factors as those may be rate-limiting, or in the overall analysis of a multi-step process including biologic, geologic, hydrologic, or atmospheric transport and chemical reactions, transport of a reactant may be limiting.

== See also ==
- Abiotic component
- Bateman's principle
- Biotic component
- Bottleneck (software)
- Chemical kinetics
- Competition (biology)
- Competitive exclusion principle
- Ecology
- Population ecology
- Resource (biology)
