= Liebig's law of the minimum =

Growth is limited by the scarcest resource

Liebig's law of the minimum, often simply called Liebig's law or the law of the minimum, is a principle developed in agricultural science by Carl Sprengel (1840) and later popularized by Justus von Liebig. It states that growth is dictated not by total resources available, but by the scarcest resource (limiting factor). The law has also been applied to biological populations and ecosystem models for factors such as sunlight or mineral nutrients.

== Applications ==
This was originally applied to plant or crop growth, where it was found that increasing the amount of plentiful nutrients did not increase plant growth. Only by increasing the amount of the limiting nutrient (the one most scarce in relation to "need") was the growth of a plant or crop improved. This principle can be summed up in the aphorism, "The availability of the most abundant nutrient in the soil is only as good as the availability of the least abundant nutrient in the soil." Or the rough analog, "A chain is only as strong as its weakest link." Though diagnosis of limiting factors to crop yields is a common study, the approach has been criticized.

=== Scientific applications ===
Liebig's law has been extended to biological populations (and is commonly used in ecosystem modelling). For example, the growth of an organism such as a plant may be dependent on a number of different factors, such as sunlight or mineral nutrients (e.g., nitrate or phosphate). The availability of these may vary, such that at any given time one is more limiting than the others. Liebig's law states that growth only occurs at the rate permitted by the most limiting factor.

For instance, in the equation below, the growth of population $O$ is a function of the minimum of three Michaelis-Menten terms representing limitation by factors $I$, $N$ and $P$.

$$\frac{dO}{dt} = O\left(\min \left( \frac{\mu_I I}{k_{I} + I}, \frac{\mu_N N}{k_{N} + N}, \frac{\mu_P P}{k_{P} + P} \right) -m\right)$$

Where $O$ is the biomass concentration or population density; $\{\mu_I,\mu_N,\mu_P\}$ are the specific growth rates in response to the concentrations of three different limiting nutrients, represented by $I$, $N$, and $P$ respectively; $\{k_I,k_N,k_P\}$ are the half-saturation constants for the three nutrients $I$, $N$, and $P$ respectively—these constants represent the concentration of the nutrient at which the growth rate is half of its maximum; $\{I,N,P\}$ are the concentrations of the three nutrient factors; and $m$ is the mortality rate or decay constant.

The use of the equation is limited to a situation where there are steady state ceteris paribus conditions, and factor interactions are tightly controlled.

=== Protein nutrition ===
In human nutrition, the law of the minimum was used by William Cumming Rose to determine the essential amino acids. In 1931 he published his study "Feeding experiments with mixtures of highly refined amino acids". Knowledge of the essential amino acids has enabled vegetarians to enhance their protein nutrition by protein combining from various vegetable sources. One practitioner was Nevin S. Scrimshaw fighting protein deficiency in India and Guatemala. Frances Moore Lappé published Diet for a Small Planet in 1971 which popularized protein combining using grains, legumes, and dairy products.

The law of the minimum was tested at University of Southern California in 1947. "The formation of protein molecules is a coordinated tissue function and can be accomplished only when all amino acids which take part in the formation are present at the same time." It was further concluded, that "'incomplete' amino acid mixtures are not stored in the body, but are irreversibly further metabolized." Robert Bruce Merrifield was a laboratory assistant for the experiments. When he wrote his autobiography he recounted in 1993 the finding:

We showed that no net growth occurred when one essential amino acid was omitted from the diet, nor did it occur if that amino acid was fed several hours after the main feeding with the deficient diet.

=== Marine primary productivity ===
Phytoplankton in marine environments are limited by various micro- and macronutrients. These nutrients make it possible for phytoplankton to grow and reproduce. Some of the most important macronutrients for phytoplankton are nitrogen and phosphorus. These are considered macronutrients, as phytoplankton need a relatively large amount to function and grow. Some of the most common micronutrients for phytoplankton are zinc, cobalt, and iron. These are considered micronutrients because phytoplankton require smaller quantities of them compared to the macronutrients. However, these micronutrients are just as important as macronutrients, and both can be limiting.

The nutrient that is limiting for each species of phytoplankton can depend on many factors, including time of year and coastal proximity. For instance, it has been shown that in coastal upwelling zones, where macronutrients like phosphorus and nitrogen are abundant due to ocean circulation patterns and terrestrial runoff, iron can be limiting. Additionally, in open ocean environments, where there are very few nutrients, macronutrients like phosphorus and nitrogen can be limiting. In general, the limiting nutrient depends on each species’ life history strategy.

=== Other applications ===
More recently Liebig's law is starting to find an application in natural resource management where it surmises that growth in markets dependent upon natural resource inputs is restricted by the most limited input. As the natural capital upon which growth depends is limited in supply due to the finite nature of the planet, Liebig's law encourages scientists and natural resource managers to calculate the scarcity of essential resources in order to allow for a multi-generational approach to resource consumption.

Neoclassical economic theory has sought to refute the issue of resource scarcity by application of the law of substitutability and technological innovation. The substitutability "law" states that as one resource is exhausted—and prices rise due to a lack of surplus—new markets based on alternative resources appear at certain prices in order to satisfy demand. Technological innovation implies that humans are able to use technology to fill the gaps in situations where resources are imperfectly substitutable.

A market-based theory depends on proper pricing. Where resources such as clean air and water are not accounted for, there will be a "market failure". These failures may be addressed with Pigovian taxes and subsidies, such as a carbon tax. While the theory of the law of substitutability is a useful rule of thumb, some resources may be so fundamental that there exist no substitutes. For example, Isaac Asimov noted, "We may be able to substitute nuclear power for coal power, and plastics for wood ... but for phosphorus there is neither substitute nor replacement."

Where no substitutes exist, such as phosphorus, recycling will be necessary. This may require careful long-term planning and governmental intervention, in part to create Pigovian taxes to allow efficient market allocation of resources, in part to address other market failures such as excessive time discounting.

== Liebig's barrel ==
Liebig's barrel

Dobenecks used the image of a barrel — often called "Liebig's barrel" — to explain Liebig's law. Just as the maximum practical capacity of a barrel with staves of unequal length is limited by the length of the shortest stave. Similarly, a plant's growth is limited by the nutrient in shortest supply.

If a system satisfies the law of the minimum then adaptation will equalize the load of different factors because the adaptation resource will be allocated for compensation of limitation. Adaptation systems act as the cooper of Liebig's barrel and lengthens the shortest stave to improve barrel capacity. Indeed, in well-adapted systems the limiting factor should be compensated as far as possible. This observation follows the concept of resource competition and fitness maximization.

Due to the law of the minimum paradoxes, if we observe the Law of the Minimum in artificial systems, then under natural conditions adaptation will equalize the load of different factors and we can expect a violation of the law of the minimum. Inversely, if artificial systems demonstrate significant violation of the law of the minimum, then we can expect that under natural conditions adaptation will compensate this violation. In a limited system life will adjust as an evolution of what came before.

== Biotechnology ==
One example of technological innovation is in plant genetics whereby the biological characteristics of species can be changed by employing genetic modification to alter biological dependence on the most limiting resource. Biotechnological innovations are thus able to extend the limits for growth in species by an increment until a new limiting factor is established, which can then be challenged through technological innovation.

Theoretically there is no limit to the number of possible increments towards an unknown productivity limit. This would be either the point where the increment to be advanced is so small it cannot be justified economically or where technology meets an invulnerable natural barrier. It may be worth adding that biotechnology itself is totally dependent on external sources of natural capital.

== See also ==
- Bottleneck (disambiguation)
- Critical chain – Method of planning and managing projects
- Critical path method – Method of scheduling activities
- Iron fertilization – Ecological concept
- Keystone species – Species with a large effect on its environment
- Random walk – Process forming a path from many random steps
- Rate determining step – Slowest step of a chemical reaction
- Sustainability – Societal goal and normative concept
- Theory of constraints – Management paradigm
