= Bottleneck =

Bottleneck may refer to the narrowed portion (neck) of a bottle. It may also refer to:

== Science and technology ==
- Bottleneck (engineering), where the performance of an entire system is limited by a single component
- Bottleneck (network), in a communication network
- Bottleneck (production), where one process reduces capacity of the whole chain
- Bottleneck (software), in software engineering
- Interconnect bottleneck, limits on integrated circuit performance
- Internet bottleneck, slowing the performance on the Internet at a particular point
- Bottleneck, a design element of some firearms cartridge cases

== Places ==
- Bottleneck (K2), a mountain feature
- Free State of Bottleneck, a quasi-state in Germany 1919–1923

== Other uses ==
- Choke point, or bottleneck, in military strategy, a feature that reduces passability of terrain
- Population bottleneck, an evolutionary event that drastically reduces a population
- Traffic bottleneck, a local disruption in a transportation network

== See also ==
- Liebig's law of the minimum, in agricultural science
- Nocturnal bottleneck, hypothesis to explain several mammal traits
- Von Neumann architecture#von Neumann bottleneck
- Reverse salient, a restricting component of a technological system
- Slide guitar, that can be played with the neck of a bottle
