= Current reality tree (theory of constraints) =

One of the thinking processes in the theory of constraints, a current reality tree (CRT) is a tool to analyze many systems or organizational problems at once. By identifying root causes common to most or all of the problems, a CRT can greatly aid focused improvement of the system. A current reality tree is a directed graph.

== Simplified explanation ==
A CRT is a focusing procedure formulated by Eliyahu Goldratt, developer of the theory of constraints. This process is intended to help leaders gain understanding of cause and effect in a situation they want to improve. It treats multiple problems in a system as symptoms arising from one or a few ultimate root causes or systemic core problems. It describes, in a visual (cause-and-effect network) diagram, the main perceived symptoms (along with secondary or hidden ones that lead up to the perceived symptoms) of a problem scenario and ultimately the apparent root causes or core conflict. The benefit of building a CRT is that it identifies the connections or dependencies between perceived symptoms (effects) and root causes (core problems or conflicts) explicitly. If core problems are identified, prioritized, and tackled well, multiple undesirable effects in the system will disappear. Leaders may then focus on solving the few core problems which would cause the biggest positive systemic changes.

== Contextual explanation ==
A CRT is a statement of an underlying core problem and the symptoms that arise from it. It maps out a sequence of cause and effect from the core problem to the symptoms. Most of the symptoms will arise from the one core problem or a core conflict. Removing the core problem may well lead to removing each of the symptoms as well. Operationally working backwards from the apparent undesirable effects or symptoms to uncover or discover the underlying core cause.

== Example ==
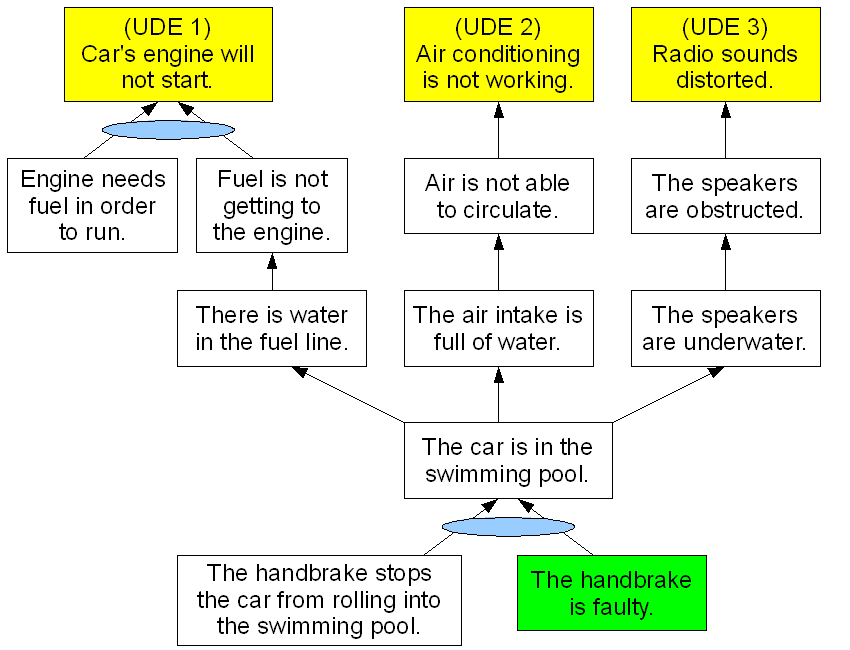
Current reality tree example

A CRT begins with a list of problems, known as undesirable effects (UDEs.) These are assumed to be symptoms of a deeper common cause. To take a somewhat frivolous example, a car owner may have the following UDEs:

- the car's engine will not start
- the air conditioning is not working
- the radio sounds distorted

The CRT depicts a chain of cause-and-effect reasoning (if, and, then) in graphical form, where ellipses or circles represent an "and". The graphic is constructed by:

- attempting to link any two UDEs using cause-and-effect reasoning. For example, "if the engine needs fuel in order to run and fuel is not getting to the engine, then the car's engine will not start."
- elaborating the reasoning to ensure it is sound and plausible. For example, "if the air intake is full of water then air conditioning is not working." Elaboration (because air is not able to circulate) gets added as in-between step.
- linking each of the remaining UDEs to the existing tree by repeating the previous steps.

This approach tends to converge on a single root cause. In the illustrated case, the root cause of the above UDEs is seen as being a faulty handbrake.

== See also ==
- Theory of constraints
- Thinking processes (theory of constraints)
- Why-because analysis
- Influence diagrams approach
