= Process-centered design =

User interface design methodology

Process-centered design (PCD) is a design methodology, which proposes a business centric approach for designing user interfaces. Because of the multi-stage business analysis steps involved right from the beginning of the PCD life cycle, it is believed to achieve the highest levels of business-IT alignment that is possible through UI.

== Purpose ==
This method is aimed at enterprise applications where there is a business process involved. Unlike content oriented systems such as websites or portals, enterprise applications are built to enable a company's business processes. Enterprise applications often have a clear business goal and a set of specific objectives like- improve employee productivity, increase business performance by a certain percent, etc.

== Comparison between other popular UI design methods ==
Although there are proven UI design methodologies (like the most popular "user-centered design", which helps design highly Usable Interfaces), PCD differentiates itself by precisely catering to business process intensive software which has not been the case with other UI design methodologies.

== Process-UI alignment ==
Process-UI alignment is a component of PCD, which ensures tight alignment between the business process and the enterprise application being developed. UI design activities are affected by PCD.

For example: A call center software used by a customer support agent, if designed for high process-UI alignment will achieve tremendous agent productivity improvement and call center performance; which is not likely to be seen if it were designed only for user satisfaction, ease of use, etc.

== See also ==
- Business process
- Overall labor effectiveness
- User-centered design
- Usability
