= Student syndrome =

Planned procrastination

Student syndrome refers to planned procrastination, when a student will substantially apply themselves to an assignment or task at the last moment before its deadline. For a person experiencing student syndrome, they only make significant progress when there is a sense of urgency that causes the person to put the proper amount of effort into their task. This eliminates any potential safety margins and puts the person under stress and pressure. An estimated 80 to 95 percent of college students engage in some form of procrastination.

The term is used to describe this form of procrastination in general, and does not only apply to students. It has been observed to affect work flow and productivity in a traditional class setting, the manufacturing industry, and professional fields, such as software engineering and engineering management.

The term was coined by Eliyahu M. Goldratt in his novel Critical Chain.

== Causes & effects of student syndrome ==
Student syndrome can be caused by poor time management, perfectionism and the fear of failure, overload, or burnout. Poor time management can cause people to fail to properly prioritize their tasks and work on them in a timely manner. Perfectionism can cause people to delay starting to work simply from the need to complete it perfectly, while a fear of failure causes a delay of work to not have to confront the possibility of not doing well on the assignment or task. People who are overloaded or burnt out may struggle to complete work and other responsibilities.

Additionally, the nature of work in college and some professional fields, in which students and workers need to structure their own time and effort to manage their work, provides greater opportunity for people to procrastinate, especially those that do not have set methods to self-regulate their work flow. There are also widely accessible distractors, such as video games and text messaging, that can easily tempt people into engaging in more desirable activities.

Because of the last minute nature of the work flow under student syndrome, it does not allow for proper adaptability to unexpected issues that arise during the work process. Student syndrome can cause a negative impact to grades or performance reviews, as the limited time to complete tasks can cause people to submit incomplete or underdeveloped work. Additionally, it can affect people's mental health and well-being due to the increase in stress and how it can affect sleep or eating habits, especially later in the semester or project timeline.Student syndrome is associated not only with time management issues but also with psychological factors. Research on procrastination has suggested that individuals may delay tasks as a way to temporarily avoid negative emotions such as stress, anxiety, or fear of failure. Some researchers describe procrastination as a form of emotional regulation behavior. Student syndrome may also negatively affect sleep quality, stress levels, attention, and learning efficiency, especially when students delay completing assignments until shortly before deadlines.

== See also ==
- Cramming (education)
- Hofstadter's law
- Parkinson's law
- Pygmalion effect
- Time management
