= Total productive maintenance =

Maintenance management methodology

Total productive maintenance (TPM) started as a method of physical asset management, focused on maintaining and improving manufacturing machinery in order to reduce the operating cost to an organization. After the PM award was created and awarded to Nippon Denso in 1971, the JIPM (Japanese Institute of Plant Maintenance), expanded it to include 8 activities of TPM that required participation from all areas of manufacturing and non-manufacturing in the concepts of lean manufacturing. TPM is designed to disseminate the responsibility for maintenance and machine performance, improving employee engagement and teamwork within management, engineering, maintenance, and operations.

There are eight types of activities in TPM implementation process:

1. Focused improvement (kobetsu-kaizen)
2. Autonomous maintenance (jishu-hozen)
3. Planned maintenance
4. Quality maintenance (hinshitsu-hozen)
5. Development management
6. Education and training
7. Office total productive maintenance (OTPM, or office TPM)
8. Safety, health and environment

== History ==
Total productive maintenance (TPM) was developed by Seiichi Nakajima in Japan between 1950 and 1970. This experience led to the recognition that a leadership mindset engaging front line teams in small group improvement activity is an essential element of effective operation. The outcome of his work was the application of the TPM process in 1971. One of the first companies to gain from this was Nippondenso, a company that created parts for Toyota. They became the first winner of the PM prize. An internationally accepted TPM benchmark developed by the JIPM Seiichi Nakajima is therefore regarded as the father of TPM. The classic TPM process he developed consisting of 5 principles was later enhanced by the JIPM to incorporate many of the lessons of lean manufacturing and is referred to as Company-Wide TPM which consists of 8 principles/activities. The name "Pillar" is symbolically used as a structural support to the structure of TPM. The term "activities" is more appropriate since execution of these 8 activities is the process of TPM implementation.

== Objectives ==
The goal of TPM is the improvement of equipment effectiveness through engaging those that impact on it in small group improvement activities. Total quality management (TQM) and total productive maintenance (TPM) are considered as the key operational activities of the quality management system. In order for TPM to be effective, the full participation of entire organisation from top to frontline operators is vital. This should result in accomplishing the goal of TPM: "Enhance the volume of the production, employee morals, and job satisfaction."

The main objective of TPM is to increase the overall equipment effectiveness (OEE) of plant equipment. TPM addresses the causes for accelerated deterioration and production losses while creating the correct environment between operators and equipment to create ownership.

OEE has three factors which are multiplied to give one measure called OEE:

Performance × Availability × Quality = OEE

Each factor has two associated losses making 6 in total, these 6 losses are as follows:

- Availability losses:
  - 1 Breakdowns (technical machine related failures)
  - 2 Waiting (organisational interruptions such as product changeovers)
- Performance losses:
  - 3 Running at reduced speed
  - 4 Minor stops (including small variations in speed)
- Quality losses
  - 5 Startup rejects
  - 6 Running rejects

In more recent definitions, the quality losses are differently categorized in order to accommodate better match with a wider range of processes and also to better reflect the financial consequences:

- Scrap (needs to be removed)
- Rework (can be fixed/redone)
- Sub Spec (does not meet the specifications, but can be used otherwise)

The objective finally is to identify then prioritize and eliminate the causes of the losses. This is done by self-managing teams that solve problems. Employing consultants to create this culture is a common practice.

=== Principles ===
The eight pillars of TPM are mostly focused on proactive and preventive techniques for improving equipment reliability:

1. Autonomous maintenance – Operators who use all of their senses to help identify causes for losses
2. Focused improvement – Scientific approach to problem solving to eliminate losses from the factory
3. Planned maintenance – Professional maintenance activities performed by trained mechanics and engineers
4. Quality maintenance – Scientific and statistical approach to identifying defects and eliminating the cause of them
5. Early/equipment management – Scientific introduction of equipment and design concepts that eliminate losses and make it easier to make defect free production efficiently
6. Education and training – Support to continuous improvement of knowledge of all workers and management
7. Administrative & office TPM – Using total productive maintenance tools to improve all the support aspects of a manufacturing plant including production scheduling, materials management and information flow, as well as increasing morale of individuals and offering awards to well deserving employees for increasing their morals
8. Safety health environmental conditions

With the help of these pillars, we can increase productivity. Manufacturing support.

== Implementation ==
Following are the steps involved by the implementation of TPM in an organization:

1. Initial evaluation of TPM level
2. Introductory Education and Propaganda (IEP) for TPM
3. Formation of TPM committee
4. Development of a master plan for TPM implementation
5. Stage by stage training to the employees and stakeholders on all eight pillars of TPM
6. Implementation preparation process
7. Establishing the TPM policies and goals and development of a road map for TPM implementation

According to Nicholas, the steering committee should consist of production managers, maintenance managers, and engineering managers. The committee should formulate TPM policies and strategies and give advice. This committee should be led by a top-level executive. Also a TPM program team must rise, this program team has oversight and coordination of implementation activities. As well, it's lacking some crucial activities, like starting with partial implementation. Choose the first target area as a pilot area, this area will demonstrate the TPM concepts. Lessons learned from early target areas/the pilot area can be applied further in the implementation process.

== Difference from TQM ==
Total quality management and total productive maintenance are often used interchangeably. However, TQM and TPM share a lot of similarities but are considered as two different approaches in the official literature. TQM attempts to increase the quality of goods, services, and concomitant customer satisfaction by raising awareness of quality concerns across the organization.

TQM is based on five cornerstones: The product, the process that allows the product to be produced, the organization that provides the proper environment needed for the process to work, the leadership that guides the organization, and commitment to excellence throughout the organization.

In other words, TQM focuses on the quality of the product, while TPM focuses on the losses that impede the equipment used to produce the products. By preventing equipment break-down, improving the quality of the equipment and by standardizing the equipment (results in less variance, so better quality), the quality of the products increases. TQM and TPM can both result in an increase in quality. However, the way of going there is different. TPM can be seen as a way to help to achieve the goal of TQM.
