= Seiichi Nakajima =

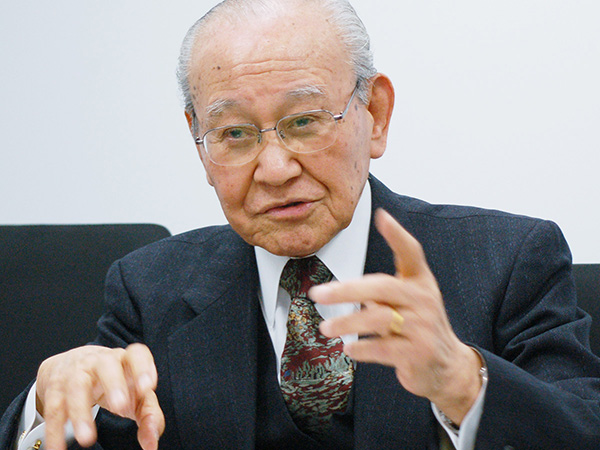
Mr. Seiichi Nakajima, the Father of TPM

Seiichi Nakajima (1919–April 11, 2015) was a Japanese citizen and pioneering founder of the Total Productive Maintenance system. He established the PM Awards (currently the TPM Awards).

Nakajima was honored by the Emperor of Japan with the Ranju Ho-sho, or Medal with Blue Ribbon. The award recognizes individuals with significant lifetime achievements, and was given to Nakajima by the Emperor "to show gratitude for the dedication to improving the manufacturing industry through TPM."

== Bibliography ==
- TPM tenkai, Seiichi Nakajima (1982, JIPM Tokyo)
- Introduction to Total Productive Maintenance, Seiichi Nakajima (October 1988 Productivity Press)
- TPM Development Program: Implementing Total Productive Maintenance (Preventative Maintenance Series), Seiichi Nakajima (October 1989 Productivity Press)
