= Thinking processes (theory of constraints) =

The thinking processes in Eliyahu M. Goldratt's theory of constraints are the five methods to enable the focused improvement of any cognitive system (especially business systems).

== Purpose ==
The purpose of the thinking processes is to help answer questions essential to achieving focused improvement:

1. What to change?
2. What to change it into?
3. How to cause the change?

Sometimes two other questions are considered as well:

4. Why change?

and:

5. How to maintain the process of ongoing improvement (POOGI)?

A more thorough rationale is presented in What is this thing called theory of constraints and how should it be implemented?

A more thorough work, mapping the use and evolution of the Thinking Processes, was conducted by Victoria Mabin et al.

== Processes ==
The primary thinking processes, as codified by Goldratt and others:

- Current reality tree (CRT, similar to the current state map used by many organizations) — evaluates the network of cause-effect relations between the undesirable effects (UDE's, also known as gap elements) and helps to pinpoint the root cause(s) of most of the undesirable effects.
- Evaporating cloud (conflict resolution diagram or CRD) - solves conflicts that usually perpetuate the causes for an undesirable situation.
- Core conflict cloud (CCC) - A combination of conflict clouds based on several UDE's. Looking for deeper conflicts that create the undesirable effects.
- Future reality tree (FRT, similar to a future state map) - Once some actions (injections) are chosen (not necessarily detailed) to solve the root cause(s) uncovered in the CRT and to resolve the conflict in the CRD the FRT shows the future states of the system and helps to identify possible negative outcomes of the changes (Negative Branches) and to prune them before implementing the changes.
- Negative branch reservations (NBR) - Identify potential negative ramifications of any action (such as an injection, or a half-baked idea). The goal of the NBR is to understand the causal path between the action and negative ramifications so that the negative effect can be "trimmed."
- Positive reinforcement loop (PRL) - Desired effect (DE) presented in FRT amplifies intermediate objective (IO) that is earlier (lower) in the tree. While intermediate objective is strengthened it positively affects this DE. Finding out PRLs makes FRT more sustaining.
- Prerequisite tree (PRT) - states all of the intermediate objectives necessary to carry out a chosen action along with the obstacles that will be overcome in the process.
- Transition tree (TT) - describes in great detail the action that will lead to the fulfillment of a plan to implement changes (outlined on a PRT or not).
- Strategy & tactics (S&T) - the overall project plan and metrics that will lead to a successful implementation and the ongoing loop through POOGI. Goldratt adapted three operating level performance measures—throughput, inventory and operating expense—and adopted three strategic performance measures—net income, return on investment, and cash flow—to maintain the change.

Some observers note that these processes are not fundamentally very different from some other management change models such as PDCA "plan–do–check–act" (aka "plan–do–study–act") or "survey–assess–decide–implement–evaluate", but the way they can be used is clearer and more straightforward.

== Books ==
- H. William Dettmer. The Logical Thinking Process: A Systems Approach to Complex Problem Solving (2007). ISBN 978-0-87389-723-5
- H. William Dettmer. Strategic Navigation: A Systems Approach to Business Strategy (2003). ISBN 0-87389-603-3
- Eliyahu M. Goldratt and Jeff Cox. The Goal: A Process of Ongoing Improvement. ISBN 0-88427-061-0
- Eliyahu M. Goldratt. It's Not Luck. ISBN 0-88427-115-3
- Eliyahu M. Goldratt. Critical Chain. ISBN 0-88427-153-6
- Eliyahu M. Goldratt, Eli Schragenheim, Carol A. Ptak. Necessary But Not Sufficient. ISBN 0-88427-170-6
- Lisa J. Scheinkopf. Thinking For a Change: Putting the TOC Thinking Processes to Use. ISBN 1-57444-101-9
- Eli Schragenheim. Management Dilemmas: The Theory of Constraints Approach to Problem Identification and Solutions. ISBN 1-57444-222-8
- John Tripp, TOC Executive Challenge A Goal Game. ISBN 0-88427-186-2
