= Resource leveling =

In project management, resource leveling is defined by A Guide to the Project Management Body of Knowledge (PMBOK Guide) as "A technique in which start and finish dates are adjusted based on resource limitation with the goal of balancing demand for resources with the available supply." Resource leveling problem could be formulated as an optimization problem. The problem could be solved by different optimization algorithms such as exact algorithms or meta-heuristic methods.

When performing project planning activities, the manager will attempt to schedule certain tasks simultaneously. When more resources such as machines or people are needed than are available, or perhaps a specific person is needed in both tasks, the tasks will have to be rescheduled concurrently or even sequentially to manage the constraint. Project planning resource leveling is the process of resolving these conflicts. It can also be used to balance the workload of primary resources over the course of the project[s], usually at the expense of one of the traditional triple constraints (time, cost, scope).

When using specially designed project software, leveling typically means resolving conflicts or over allocations in the project plan by allowing the software to calculate delays and update tasks automatically. Project management software leveling requires delaying tasks until resources are available. In more complex environments, resources could be allocated across multiple, concurrent projects thus requiring the process of resource leveling to be performed at company level.

In either definition, leveling could result in a later project finish date if the tasks affected are in the critical path.

Resource leveling is also useful in the world of maintenance management. Many organizations have maintenance backlogs. These backlogs consist of work orders. In a "planned state" these work orders have estimates such as 2 electricians for 8 hours. These work orders have other attributes such as report date, priority, asset operational requirements, and safety concerns. These same organizations have a need to create weekly schedules. Resource-leveling can take the "work demand" and balance it against the resource pool availability for the given week. The goal is to create this weekly schedule in advance of performing the work. Without resource-leveling the organization (planner, scheduler, supervisor) is most likely performing subjective selection. For the most part, when it comes to maintenance scheduling, there is less, if any, task interdependence, and therefore less need to calculate critical path and total float.

== See also ==
- Resource allocation
