= Eliyahu M. Goldratt =

Israeli business management guru (1947–2011)

- אליהו משה גולדרט
- Born: Eliyahu Moshe Goldratt; March 31, 1947
- Died: June 11, 2011 (aged 64)
- Known for: Theory of constraints Cause and effect thinking Slayer of paradigms
- Scientific career
- Fields: Theory of constraints Operations research Organizational psychology Management science Education

Eliyahu Moshe Goldratt (Hebrew: אליהו משה גולדרט; March 31, 1947 – June 11, 2011) was an Israeli business management guru. He was the originator of the Optimized Production Technique, the Theory of Constraints (TOC), the Thinking Processes, Drum-Buffer-Rope, Critical Chain Project Management (CCPM) and other TOC derived tools.

He was the author of several business novels and non-fiction works, mainly on the application of the theory of constraints to various manufacturing, engineering, and other business processes.

The processes are typically modeled as resource flows, the constraints typically represent limits on flows. In his book The Goal, the protagonist is a manager in charge of a troubled manufacturing operation. At any point in time, one particular constraint (such as inadequate capacity at a machine tool) limits total system throughput, and when the constraint is resolved, another constraint becomes the critical one. The plot of Goldratt's stories revolve around identifying the current limiting constraint and raising it, which is followed by finding out which is the next limiting constraint. Another common theme is that the system being analyzed has excess capacity at a number of non-critical points, which, contrary to conventional wisdom, is essential to ensure constant operation of the constrained resource.

== Life ==
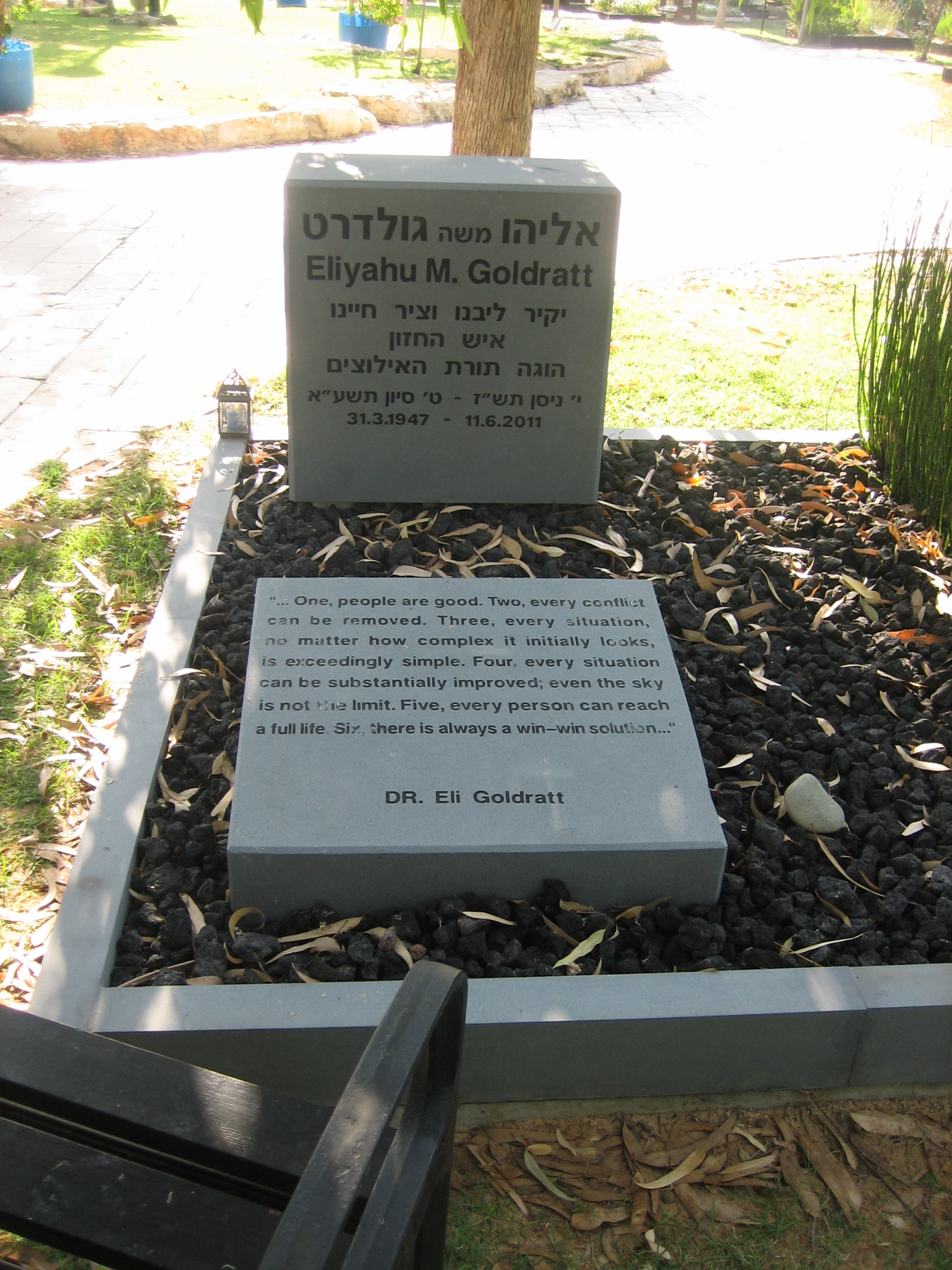
Eliyahu M. Goldratt's grave

Goldratt was born into a rabbinic family, the son of Avraham-Yehuda Goldrat, in British Mandatory Palestine one year prior to Israel's modern statehood. He obtained a BSc degree from Tel Aviv University, and MSc and PhD degrees from Bar-Ilan University in Ramat Gan, Israel. Goldratt died from complications arising from lung cancer on June 11, 2011 in his home in Israel.

== Work ==
=== Creative Output years ===
After some experience helping Israeli manufacturers, Goldratt left the academic world to join a company called Creative Output. The company developed and sold a software package, the Optimized Production Technology (OPT). OPT was billed as the first software to provide finite capacity scheduling for production environments. This software and the principles behind it were analyzed by a number of major publications

Goldratt was actively involved in many controversies such as Cost Accounting v Throughput Accounting and culminated in the publication of "A Town Without Walls".

Within the company, Goldratt noticed elements that made him uncomfortable. For instance, in the second edition of The Goal several software implementations did not come close to their estimated potential. After some work, Goldratt discovered that the habits and assumptions (paradigms) of employees and managers prior to using the software were still prominent and negatively influenced results after implementation.

His answer was the book The Goal that took 13 months to write. After completion, the book was not well received by the company staff and by large publishers. Finally, with help from Larry Gadd, the owner of North River Press, the book was published and became a great success. After a while, Goldratt noticed that many implementations were conducted using the book but not the software. This caused further stress in the company and Goldratt tried to capture the essence of how to implement the solution directly in what is now known as Drum-Buffer-Rope method. He published The Race to explain some of the concepts he was working on and developed a course to teach people how to manage their production using a computer simulation game.

Goldratt tried to move the company down the path of "consulting," trying to help people rethink the way they did things, but Creative Output's declining revenues and Goldratt's involvement with things other than the sales of OPT software convinced the shareholders to fire Goldratt (and afterward his closer collaborators).

=== Avraham Y. Goldratt Institute years ===
After leaving Creative Output circa 1985, Goldratt created the Avraham Y Goldratt Institute or AGI (named after his father) to promote the Theory of Constraints and help it be implemented worldwide.

During the time of the AGI, Goldratt got deeply involved with the further development of TOC, mainly the Thinking Processes (launching it publicly in 1991), Critical Chain Project Management and other applications. His concepts influenced applications outside manufacturing and supply management, including the field of sales process engineering.

In 1997, Goldratt followed his plan to retire from the Institute prior to his 50th birthday.

=== Goldratt Group years ===
From the beginning of the 2000s, Goldratt created the self-funded Goldratt Group and launched the Viable Vision initiative.

He continued the development of TOC both in the Goldratt Group and in active support for other developments like TOC for Education, TOC in Healthcare, TOC for the Individual (in the continuity of the Odyssey Program, and the publishing of The Choice).

== Writings ==
=== Business novels ===
- Eliyahu M. Goldratt, Jeff Cox. The Goal: A Process of Ongoing Improvement. (1984). North River Press; 2nd Rev edition (1992). ISBN 0-88427-061-0; 20th Anniversary edition (2004) 0-88427-178-1 The book introduces TOC process for improving organizations and briefly covers TOC's accounting aspects. While set in a manufacturing company, the book provides the context for a more generic approach to continuous improvement.
- Eliyahu M. Goldratt. It's Not Luck. (1994) ISBN 0-88427-115-3 applies TOC to marketing, distribution and business strategy; Goldratt illustrates use of the thinking processes to address policy constraints.
- Eliyahu M. Goldratt. Critical Chain. (1997) ISBN 0-88427-153-6 applies TOC to project management and illustrates the Critical Chain method for managing projects while commenting on the MBA academic environment and its issues
- Eliyahu M. Goldratt. Late Night Discussions on the Theory of Constraints. (1998) ISBN 0-88427-160-9
- Eliyahu M. Goldratt, Eli Schragenheim, Carol A. Ptak. Necessary But Not Sufficient. (2000) ISBN 0-88427-170-6 applies TOC to enterprise resource planning (ERP) and operations software
- Eliyahu M. Goldratt, Ilan Eshkoli, Joe Brownleer. Isn't It Obvious? (2009) ISBN 0-88427-178-1 The story is about a husband (manager) and wife (purchaser) working in her family's retail chain. An unexpected crisis helps them to find new ways of doing things, ending in success.

=== Nonfiction books ===
- Eliyahu M. Goldratt and Robert E. Fox. The Race. (1986) ISBN 0-88427-062-9 further develops the logistical system called drum-buffer-rope (DBR), based on metaphors developed in The Goal.
- Eliyahu M. Goldratt. Essays on the Theory of Constraints. (1987) ISBN 0-88427-159-5
- Eliyahu M. Goldratt. What is this Thing Called Theory of Constraints. (1990) ISBN 0-88427-166-8 addresses the five focusing steps of ongoing improvement and fundamentals of the thinking processes.
- Eliyahu M. Goldratt. The Haystack Syndrome: Sifting Information Out of the Data Ocean. (1991) ISBN 0-88427-184-6 looks deeper into the idea of performance measurements, examines differences between data and information, and explains the logic of the need for information.
- Eliyahu M. Goldratt. Production the TOC Way (Revised Edition). (2003) ISBN 0-88427-175-7
- Eliyahu M. Goldratt and Efrat Goldratt-Ashlag. The Choice (2008) North River Press; ISBN 0-88427-189-7 Revised edition (2010) North River Press; ISBN 0-88427-193-5 The book discusses Goldratt's approach through a conversation with his daughter Efrat, as he explains to her his fundamental system of beliefs. The revised ed. includes Efrat's own notes she made during the conversation with her father, helping the reader determine the true essence of the book.

=== Plays ===
- Eliyahu M. Goldratt. 1995. UnCommon Sense. The play (final revision), New Haven, CT: Avraham Y. Goldratt Institute.

=== Influence ===
- The Goal and Goldratt's thinking was a significant influence for the authors of The Phoenix Project, a book by Gene Kim

== See also ==
- Business fable
- Organizational capital
