= The Goal (novel) =

1985 novel by Eliyahu M. Goldratt

The Goal: A Process of Ongoing Improvement
- Front cover
- Author: Eliyahu M. Goldratt
- Language: English
- Publisher: North River Press
- Publication date: 1984 First Edition; 1986 Revised First Edition; 1992 Revised Second Edition; 2004 Revised Third Edition; 2014 Fourth Revised (30th Anniversary) Edition
- Media type: Softcover
- Pages: 384
- ISBN: 978-0-88427-178-9
- OCLC: 56194659
- Dewey Decimal: 823/.914 22
- LC Class: PR9510.9.G64 G6 2004
- Followed by: It's Not Luck

The Goal is a management-oriented novel by Eliyahu M. Goldratt, a business consultant known for his theory of constraints and Jeff Cox, the author of several management-oriented novels. The Goal was originally published in 1984 and has been revised and republished. It describes a case study in operations management, focusing on the theory of constraints and bottlenecks in addition to how to alleviate them. In 2011, Time listed the book as being one of "the 25 most influential business management books".

== Setting ==
Like other books by Goldratt and Cox, The Goal is written as fiction. The main character is Alex Rogo, who manages a production plant with an uncertain future. Bill Peach, a company executive, tells Alex that he has three months to turn operations at his plant around from being unprofitable and unreliable to being successful. Jonah, a physicist, whom many believe represents Goldratt himself, helps him solve the company's problems through a series of telephone calls and brief meetings wherein he explains many fundamental business concepts. A second story line is introduced about Alex's marital life.

== Bottlenecks ==
The book points out the role of bottlenecks (constraints) in a manufacturing process, and how identifying them not only makes it possible to reduce their impact, but also yields a useful tool for measuring and controlling the flow of materials. Alex and his team identify the bottlenecks in their process and immediately begin to implement changes to help increase capacity and speed up production. In response to questions about the logic of using outdated technology in modern manufacturing, Alex's team brought in an old machine they received for free (which had previously been used at their plant in conjunction with two other machines) in order to increase the capacity of the NCX-10 machine, which was identified as one of the two bottlenecks. Furthermore, they identified processes at the heat treat, identified as their second bottleneck, which caused massive delays in them getting product through the heat treat and which had caused some products to be heat-treated multiple times (to make softer and then harder again) instead of only once or not at all.

== Socratic method ==
In the book, Jonah teaches Alex Rogo by using the Socratic method. Throughout the book, whenever a meeting or telephone call dialogue involves Jonah, he poses a question to Alex or a member of his crew, in turn causing them to talk amongst themselves to come up with a solution to their problem. When Alex is with his wife, he finds the Socratic method as a way to fix his marriage, which he uses with his crew, to come up with the five steps they should use to fix problems in the plant. Eventually it leads him and Lou to find the three things every division manager, the position to which Alex is promoted, should be able to find.

== Characters ==
- Alex Rogo – protagonist, manufacturing plant manager
- Bill Peach – division vice-president
- Fran – Alex's secretary
- Jonah – advisor, Alex's former physics professor
- Lou – chief accountant / plant controller
- Stacey – inventory manager
- Julie Rogo – Alex's wife
- Bob Donovan – production manager
- Ralph Nakamura – data processing manager
- Herbie – the bottleneck and the solution
- Dave – Alex's son
- Sharon – Alex's daughter
- Mike O'Donnel – union rep
- Ethan Frost – division controller
- Johnny Jons – marketing director / sales manager
- Hilton Smyth – assistant division controller
- Bucky Burnside – president of UniCo's biggest customer

== See also ==
- List of project management topics
- List of management topics

== Editions ==
- Goldratt, Eliyahu M.; Cox, Jeff (1984). The Goal: A Process of Ongoing Improvement. Pretoria, South Africa: National Productivity Institute. ISBN 978-0-947015-45-9.
- Goldratt, Eliyahu M.; Cox, Jeff (1984). The Goal. Gower Publishing. ISBN 978-0-566-02683-6.
- Goldratt, Eliyahu M.; Cox, Jeff (1986). The Goal: A Process of Ongoing Improvement. Great Barrington, MA.: North River Press. ISBN 0-88427-061-0.
