= Theory of constraints =

Management paradigm

The theory of constraints (TOC) is a management paradigm that views any manageable system as being limited in achieving more of its goals by a very small number of constraints. There is always at least one constraint, and TOC uses a focusing process to identify the constraint and restructure the rest of the organization around it. TOC adopts the common idiom "a chain is no stronger than its weakest link". That means that organizations and processes are vulnerable because the weakest person or part can always damage or break them, or at least adversely affect the outcome.

== History ==
The theory of constraints is an overall management philosophy, introduced by Eliyahu M. Goldratt in his 1984 book titled The Goal, that is geared to help organizations continually achieve their goals. Goldratt adapted the concept to project management with his book Critical Chain, published in 1997.

An earlier propagator of a similar concept was Wolfgang Mewes in Germany with publications on power-oriented management theory (Machtorientierte Führungstheorie, 1963) and following with his Energo-Kybernetic System (EKS, 1971), later renamed Engpasskonzentrierte Strategie (Bottleneck-focused Strategy) as a more advanced theory of bottlenecks. The publications of Wolfgang Mewes are marketed through the FAZ Verlag, publishing house of the German newspaper Frankfurter Allgemeine Zeitung. However, the paradigm Theory of constraints was first used by Goldratt.

=== Key assumption ===
The underlying premise of the theory of constraints is that organizations can be measured and controlled by variations on three measures: throughput, operational expense, and inventory. Inventory is all the money that the system has invested in purchasing things which it intends to sell. Operational expense is all the money the system spends in order to turn inventory into throughput. Throughput is the rate at which the system generates money through sales.

Before the goal itself can be reached, necessary conditions must first be met. These typically include safety, quality, legal obligations, etc. For most businesses, the goal itself is to make profit. However, for many organizations and non-profit businesses, making money is a necessary condition for pursuing the goal. Whether it is the goal or a necessary condition, understanding how to make sound financial decisions based on throughput, inventory, and operating expense is a critical requirement.

=== The five focusing steps ===
TOC is based on the premise that the rate of goal achievement by a goal-oriented system (i.e., the system's throughput) is limited by at least one constraint.

The argument by reductio ad absurdum is as follows: If there was nothing preventing a system from achieving higher throughput (i.e., more goal units in a unit of time), its throughput would be infinite – which is impossible in a real-life system.

Only by increasing flow through the constraint can overall throughput be increased.

Assuming the goal of a system has been articulated and its measurements defined, the steps are:

1. Identify the system's constraint(s).
2. Decide how to exploit the system's constraint(s).
3. Subordinate everything else to the above decision.
4. Elevate the system's constraint(s).
5. Warning! If in the previous steps a constraint has been broken, go back to step 1, but do not allow inertia to cause a system's constraint.

The goal of a commercial organization is: "Make more money now and in the future", and its measurements are given by throughput accounting as: throughput, inventory, and operating expenses.

The five focusing steps aim to ensure ongoing improvement efforts are centered on the organization's constraint(s). In the TOC literature, this is referred to as the process of ongoing improvement (POOGI).

These focusing steps are the key steps to developing the specific applications mentioned below.

=== Constraints ===
A constraint is anything that prevents the system from achieving its goal. There are many ways that constraints can show up, but a core principle within TOC is that there are not tens or hundreds of constraints. There is at least one, but at most only a few in any given system. Constraints can be internal or external to the system. An internal constraint is in evidence when the market demands more from the system than it can deliver. If this is the case, then the focus of the organization should be on discovering that constraint and following the five focusing steps to open it up (and potentially remove it). An external constraint exists when the system can produce more than the market will bear. If this is the case, then the organization should focus on mechanisms to create more demand for its products or services.

Types of (internal) constraints

- Equipment: The way equipment is currently used limits the ability of the system to produce more salable goods/services.
- People: Lack of skilled people limits the system. Mental models held by people can cause behaviour that becomes a constraint.
- Policy: A written or unwritten policy prevents the system from making more.

The concept of the constraint in Theory of Constraints is analogous to but differs from the constraint that shows up in mathematical optimization. In TOC, the constraint is used as a focusing mechanism for management of the system. In optimization, the constraint is written into the mathematical expressions to limit the scope of the solution (X can be no greater than 5).

Please note: organizations have many problems with equipment, people, policies, etc. (A breakdown is just that – a breakdown – and is not a constraint in the true sense of the TOC concept). The constraint is the limiting factor that is preventing the organization from getting more throughput (typically, revenue through sales) even when nothing goes wrong.

=== Breaking a constraint ===
If a constraint's throughput capacity is elevated to the point where it is no longer the system's limiting factor, this is said to "break" the constraint. The limiting factor is now some other part of the system, or may be external to the system (an external constraint). This is not to be confused with a breakdown.

=== Buffers ===
Buffers are used throughout the theory of constraints. They often result as part of the exploit and subordinate steps of the five focusing steps. Buffers are placed before the governing constraint, thus ensuring that the constraint is never starved. Buffers are also placed behind the constraint to prevent downstream failure from blocking the constraint's output. Buffers used in this way protect the constraint from variations in the rest of the system and should allow for normal variation of processing time and the occasional upset (Murphy) before and behind the constraint.

Buffers can be a bank of physical objects before a work center, waiting to be processed by that work center. Buffers ultimately buy you time, as in the time before work reaches the constraint and are often verbalized as time buffers. There should always be enough (but not excessive) work in the time queue before the constraint and adequate offloading space behind the constraint.

Buffers are not the small queue of work that sits before every work center in a kanban system although it is similar if you regard the assembly line as the governing constraint. A prerequisite in the theory is that with one constraint in the system, all other parts of the system must have sufficient capacity to keep up with the work at the constraint and to catch up if time was lost. In a balanced line, as espoused by kanban, when one work center goes down for a period longer than the buffer allows, then the entire system must wait until that work center is restored. In a TOC system, the only situation where work is in danger is if the constraint is unable to process (either due to malfunction, sickness or a "hole" in the buffer – if something goes wrong that the time buffer can not protect).

Buffer management, therefore, represents a crucial attribute of the theory of constraints. There are many ways to apply buffers, but the most often used is a visual system of designating the buffer in three colors: green (okay), yellow (caution) and red (action required). Creating this kind of visibility enables the system as a whole to align and thus subordinate to the need of the constraint in a holistic manner. This can also be done daily in a central operations room that is accessible to everybody.

=== Plant types ===
There are four primary types of plants in the TOC lexicon. Draw the flow of material from the bottom of a page to the top, and you get the four types. They specify the general flow of materials through a system, and also provide some hints about where to look for typical problems. This type of analysis is known as VATI analysis as it uses the bottom-up shapes of the letters V, A, T, and I to describe the types of plants. The four types can be combined in many ways in larger facilities, e.g. "an A plant feeding a V plant".

V-plant
The general flow of material is one-to-many, such as a plant that takes one raw material and can make many final products. Classic examples are meat rendering plants or a steel manufacturer. The primary problem in V-plants is "robbing," where one operation (A) immediately after a diverging point "steals" materials meant for the other operation (B). Once the material has been processed by A, it cannot come back and be run through B without significant rework.
A-plant
The general flow of material is many-to-one, such as in a plant where many sub-assemblies converge for a final assembly. The primary problem in A-plants is in synchronizing the converging lines so that each supplies the final assembly point at the right time.
T-plant
The general flow is that of an I-plant (or has multiple lines), which then splits into many assemblies (many-to-many). Most manufactured parts are used in multiple assemblies and nearly all assemblies use multiple parts. Customized devices, such as computers, are good examples. T-plants suffer from both synchronization problems of A-plants (parts aren't all available for an assembly) and the robbing problems of V-plants (one assembly steals parts that could have been used in another).
I-plant
Material flows in a sequence, such as in an assembly line. The primary work is done in a straight sequence of events (one-to-one). The constraint is the slowest operation.

From the above list, one can deduce that for non-material systems one could draw the flow of work or the flow of processes, instead of physical flows, and arrive at similar basic V, A, T, or I structures. A project, for example, is an A-shaped sequence of work, culminating in a delivered product (i.e., the intended outcome of the project).

== Applications ==
The focusing steps, this process of ongoing improvement, have been applied to manufacturing, project management, supply chain/distribution generated specific solutions. Other tools (mainly the "thinking process") also led to TOC applications in the fields of marketing and sales, and finance. The solution as applied to each of these areas are listed below.

=== Operations ===
Within manufacturing operations and operations management, the solution seeks to pull materials through the system, rather than push them into the system. The primary methodology used is drum-buffer-rope (DBR) and a variation called simplified drum-buffer-rope (S-DBR).

Drum-buffer-rope is a manufacturing execution methodology based on the fact the output of a system can only be the same as the output at the constraint of the system. Any attempt to produce more than what the constraint can process just leads to excess inventory piling up. The method is named for its three components. The drum is the rate at which the physical constraint of the plant can work: the work center or machine or operation that limits the ability of the entire system to produce more. The rest of the plant follows the beat of the drum. Schedule at the drum decides what the system should produce, in what sequence to produce and how much to produce. They make sure the drum has work and that anything the drum has processed does not get wasted.

The buffer protects the drum, so that it always has work flowing to it. Buffers in DBR provide the additional lead time beyond the required set up and process times, for materials in the product flow. Since these buffers have time as their unit of measure, rather than quantity of material, this makes the priority system operate strictly based on the time an order is expected to be at the drum. Each work order will have a remaining buffer status that can be calculated. Based on this buffer status, work orders can be color coded into Red, Yellow and Green. The red orders have the highest priority and must be worked on first, since they have penetrated most into their buffers followed by yellow and green. As time evolves, this buffer status might change and the color assigned to the particular work order change with it.

Traditional DBR usually calls for buffers at several points in the system: the constraint, synchronization points and at shipping. S-DBR has a buffer at shipping and manages the flow of work across the drum through a load planning mechanism.

The rope is the work release mechanism for the plant. Orders are released to the shop floor at one "buffer time" before they are due to be processed by the constraint. In other words, if the buffer is 5 days, the order is released 5 days before it is due at the constraint. Putting work into the system earlier than this buffer time is likely to generate too-high work-in-process and slow down the entire system.

=== High-speed automated production lines ===
Automated production lines achieve high throughput rates and output quantities by deploying automation solutions that are highly task-specific. Depending on their design and construction, these machines operate at different speeds and capacities and therefore have varying efficiency levels.

A prominent example is the use of automated production lines in the beverage industry. Filling systems usually have several machines executing parts of the complete bottling process, from filling primary containers to secondary packaging and palletisation.

To be able to maximize the throughput, the production line usually has a designed constraint. This constraint is typically the slowest and often the most expensive machine on the line. The overall throughput of the line is determined by this machine. All other machines can operate faster and are connected by conveyors.

The conveyors usually have the ability to buffer product. In the event of a stoppage at a machine other than the constraint, the conveyor can buffer the product enabling the constraint machine to keep on running.

A typical line setup is such that in normal operation the upstream conveyors from the constraint machine are always run full to prevent starvation at the constraint and the downstream conveyors are run empty to prevent a back up at the constraint. The overall aim is to prevent minor stoppages at the machines from impacting the constraint.

For this reason as the machines get further from the constraint, they have the ability to run faster than the previous machine and this creates a V curve.

=== Supply chain and logistics ===
In general, the solution for supply chains is to create flow of inventory so as to ensure greater availability and to eliminate surpluses.

The TOC distribution solution is effective when used to address a single link in the supply chain and more so across the entire system, even if that system comprises many different companies. The purpose of the TOC distribution solution is to establish a competitive advantage based on extraordinary availability by reducing the damages caused when the flow of goods is interrupted by shortages and surpluses.

This approach uses several new rules to protect availability with less inventory than is conventionally required.

1. Inventory is held at an aggregation point(s) as close as possible to the source. This approach ensures smoothed demand at the aggregation point, requiring proportionally less inventory. The distribution centers holding the aggregated stock are able to ship goods downstream to the next link in the supply chain much more quickly than a make-to-order manufacturer can.
2. Following this rule may result in a make-to-order manufacturer converting to make-to-stock. The inventory added at the aggregation point is significantly less than the inventory reduction downstream.
3. In all stocking locations, initial inventory buffers are set which effectively create an upper limit of the inventory at that location. The buffer size is equal to the maximum expected consumption within the average Replenishment Time ("RT"), plus additional stock to protect in case a delivery is late. In other words, there is no advantage in holding more inventory in a location than the amount that might be consumed before more could be ordered and received. Typically, the sum of the on hand value of such buffers are 25–75% less than currently observed average inventory levels
  1. Replenishment Time (RT) is the sum of the delay, after the first consumption following a delivery, before an order is placed plus the delay after the order is placed until the ordered goods arrive at the ordering location.
4. Once buffers have been established, no replenishment orders are placed as long as the quantity inbound (already ordered but not yet received) plus the quantity on hand are equal to or greater than the buffer size. Following this rule causes surplus inventory to be bled off as it is consumed.
5. For any reason, when on hand plus inbound inventory is less than the buffer, orders are placed as soon as practical to increase the inbound inventory so that the relationship on Hand + Inbound = Buffer is maintained.
6. To ensure buffers remain correctly sized even with changes in the rates of demand and replenishment, a simple recursive algorithm called Buffer Management is used. When the on hand inventory level is in the upper third of the buffer for a full RT, the buffer is reduced by one third (and don't forget rule 3). Alternatively, when the on hand inventory is in the bottom one third of the buffer for too long, the buffer is increased by one third (and don't forget rule 4). The definition of "too long" may be changed depending on required service levels, however, a rule of thumb is 20% of the RT. Moving buffers up more readily than down is supported by the usually greater damage caused by shortages as compared to the damage caused by surpluses.

Once inventory is managed as described above, continuous efforts should be undertaken to reduce RT, late deliveries, supplier minimum order quantities (both per SKU and per order) and customer order batching. Any improvements in these areas will automatically improve both availability and inventory turns, thanks to the adaptive nature of Buffer Management.

A stocking location that manages inventory according to the TOC should help a non-TOC customer (downstream link in a supply chain, whether internal or external) manage their inventory according to the TOC process. This type of help can take the form of a vendor managed inventory (VMI). The TOC distribution link simply extends its buffer sizing and management techniques to its customers' inventories. Doing so has the effect of smoothing the demand from the customer and reducing order sizes per SKU. VMI results in better availability and inventory turns for both supplier and customer. The benefits to the non-TOC customers are sufficient to meet the purpose of capitalizing on the competitive edge by giving the customer a reason to be more loyal and give more business to the upstream link. When the end consumers buy more, the whole supply chain sells more.

One caveat should be considered. Initially and only temporarily, the supply chain or a specific link may sell less as the surplus inventory in the system is sold. However, the sales lift due to improved availability is a countervailing factor. The current levels of surpluses and shortages make each case different.

=== Finance and accounting ===
Holistic thinking applied to the finance application has been termed throughput accounting. Throughput accounting suggests that one examine the impact of investments and operational changes in terms of the impact on the throughput of the business. It is an alternative to cost accounting.

The primary measures for a TOC view of finance and accounting are: throughput, operating expense and investment. Throughput is calculated from sales minus "totally variable cost", where totally variable cost is usually calculated as the cost of raw materials that go into creating the item sold.

=== Project management ===
Critical Chain Project Management (CCPM) are utilized in this area. CCPM is based on the idea that all projects look like A-plants: all activities converge to a final deliverable. As such, to protect the project, there must be internal buffers to protect synchronization points and a final project buffer to protect the overall project.

=== Marketing and sales ===
While originally focused on manufacturing and logistics, TOC has expanded into sales management and marketing. Its role is explicitly acknowledged in the field of sales process engineering. For effective sales management one can apply Drum Buffer Rope to the sales process similar to the way it is applied to operations (see Reengineering the Sales Process book reference below). This technique is appropriate when your constraint is in the sales process itself, or if you just want an effective sales management technique which includes the topics of funnel management and conversion rates.

== Thinking processes ==
The thinking processes are a set of tools to help managers walk through the steps of initiating and implementing a project. When used in a logical flow, they help walk through a buy-in process:

1. Gain agreement on the problem
2. Gain agreement on the direction for a solution
3. Gain agreement that the solution solves the problem
4. Agree to overcome any potential negative ramifications
5. Agree to overcome any obstacles to implementation

TOC practitioners sometimes refer to these in the negative as working through layers of resistance to a change.

Recently, the current reality tree (CRT) and future reality tree (FRT) have been applied to an argumentative academic paper.

Despite its origins as a manufacturing approach (Goldratt & Cox, The Goal: A process of Ongoing Improvement, 1992), Goldratt's Theory of Constraints (TOC) methodology is now regarded as a systems methodology with strong foundations in the hard sciences (Mabin, 1999). Through its tools for convergent thinking and synthesis, the "Thinking processes", which underpin the entire TOC methodology, help identify and manage constraints and guide continuous improvement and change in organizations (Dettmer H., 1998).

The process of change requires the identification and acceptance of core issues; the goal and the means to the goal. This comprehensive set of logical tools can be used for exploration, solution development and solution implementation for individuals, groups or organizations. Each tool has a purpose and nearly all tools can be used independently (Cox & Spencer, 1998). Since these thinking tools are designed to address successive "layers of resistance" and enable communication, it expedites securing "buy in" of groups. While CRT (current reality tree) represents the undesirable effects of the current situation, the FRT (the future reality tree), NBR (negative branch) help people plan and understand the possible results of their actions. The PRT (prerequisite tree) and TRT (transition tree) are designed to build collective buy in and aid in the Implementation phase. The logical constructs of these tools or diagrams are the necessary condition logic, the sufficient cause logic and the strict logic rules that are used to validate cause-effect relationships which are modelled with these tools (Dettmer W., 2006).

A summary of these tools, the questions they help answer and the associated logical constructs used is presented in the table below.

	Sufficient thinking ("If… then")	Necessary thinking ("In order to…we must")
What to change?	Current reality tree	
What to change to?	Future Reality Tree Negative Branch Reservations	Evaporating cloud
How to change?	Transition Tree	Prerequisite Tree

=== TOC thinking process tools ===
Use of these tools are based on the fundamental beliefs of TOC that organizations a) are inherently simple (interdependencies exist in organizations) b) desire inherent harmony (win – win solutions are possible) c) are inherently good (people are good) and have inherent potential (people and organizations have potential to do better) (Goldratt E., 2009). In the book "Through the clouds to solutions" Jelena Fedurko (Fedurko, 2013) states that the major areas for application of TP tools as:

- To create and enhance thinking and learning skills
- To make better decisions
- To develop responsibility for one's own actions through understanding their consequences
- To handle conflicts with more confidence and win-win outcomes
- To correct behavior with undesirable consequences
- Assist in evaluating conditions for achieving a desired outcome
- To assist in peer mediation
- To assist in relationship between subordinates and bosses

== Development and practice ==
TOC was initiated by Goldratt, who until his death was still the main driving force behind the development and practice of TOC. There is a network of individuals and small companies loosely coupled as practitioners around the world. TOC is sometimes referred to as "constraint management". TOC is a large body of knowledge with a strong guiding philosophy of growth.

== Criticism ==
Criticisms that have been leveled against TOC include:

=== Claimed suboptimality of drum-buffer-rope ===
While TOC has been compared favorably to linear programming techniques, D. Trietsch from University of Auckland argues that DBR methodology is inferior to competing methodologies. Linhares, from the Getulio Vargas Foundation, has shown that the TOC approach to establishing an optimal product mix is unlikely to yield optimum results, as it would imply that P=NP.

=== Unacknowledged debt ===
Duncan (as cited by Steyn) says that TOC borrows heavily from systems dynamics developed by Forrester in the 1950s and from statistical process control which dates back to World War II. And Noreen Smith and Mackey, in their independent report on TOC, point out that several key concepts in TOC "have been topics in management accounting textbooks for decades." It is also claimed that Goldratt's books fail to acknowledge that TOC borrows from more than 40 years of previous management science research and practice, particularly from program evaluation and review technique/critical path method (PERT/CPM) and the just in time strategy.

A rebuttal to these criticisms is offered in Goldratt's "What is the Theory of Constraints and How Should it be Implemented?", and in his audio program, "Beyond The Goal". In these, Goldratt discusses the history of disciplinary sciences, compares the strengths and weaknesses of the various disciplines, and acknowledges the sources of information and inspiration for the thinking processes and critical chain methodologies. Articles published in the now-defunct Journal of Theory of Constraints referenced foundational materials. Goldratt published an article and gave talks with the title "Standing on the Shoulders of Giants" in which he gives credit for many of the core ideas of Theory of Constraints. Goldratt has sought many times to show the correlation between various improvement methods.

Goldratt has been criticized on lack of openness in his theories, an example being him not releasing the algorithm he used for the Optimum Performance Training system. Some view him as unscientific with many of his theories, tools and techniques not being a part of the public domain, rather a part of his own framework of profiting on his ideas. According to Gupta and Snyder (2009), despite being recognized as a genuine management philosophy nowadays, TOC has yet failed to demonstrate its effectiveness in the academic literature and as such, cannot be considered academically worthy to be called a widely recognized theory. TOC needs more case studies that prove a connection between implementation and improved financial performance. Nave (2002) argues that TOC does not take employees into account and fails to empower them in the production process. He also states that TOC fails to address unsuccessful policies as constraints. In contrast, Mukherjee and Chatterjee (2007) state that much of the criticism of Goldratt's work has been focused on the lack of rigour in his work, but not of the bottleneck approach, which are two different aspects of the issue.

== Certification and education ==
The Theory of Constraints International Certification Organization (TOCICO) is an independent not-for-profit incorporated society that sets exams to ensure a consistent standard of competence. It is overseen by a board of academic and industrial experts. It also hosts an annual international conference. The work presented at these conferences constitutes a core repository of the current knowledge.

== See also ==
- Index of articles related to the theory of constraints
- Linear programming
- Industrial engineering
- Limiting factor
- Systems thinking – Critical systems thinking – Joint decision traps
- Twelve leverage points by Donella Meadows
- Constraint (disambiguation)
- Thinklets
- Throughput
- Rate-determining step
- Liebig's law of the minimum
