= Everhour =

Team-oriented time tracking software

- Initial release: 2015
- Platform: Web application
- Available in: English
- Type: Time tracking software
- License: Subscription - based
- Website: everhour.com

Everhour is a team-oriented time tracking software product that was launched in 2015 by Weavora Consulting LLC, a web development company from Minsk, Belarus.

== Properties ==
Everhour has the following properties:

- Chrome extension
- Time tracking
- Accounting
- Integration and synchronization with many kinds of business tools such as: Asana, Basecamp, GitHub, Trello, BitBucket, FreshBooks, Jira, Insightly, Pivotal Tracker, QuickBooks, Slack, Teamwork Projects and Xero
- Responsive interface

== See also ==
- Grindstone (time-tracking software)
- Comparison of time-tracking software
