= Comparison of time-tracking software =

This is a comparison of notable time-tracking software packages and web hosted services.

Name	Platform support	Launched	Features	Integration	Data-storage	Licensing
ActivTrak	Microsoft Windows, MacOS, ChromeOS	2009	Productivity reporting, application & website usage statistics, benchmarks & goal setting, screenshots, real-time user activity reporting, website blocking.	Salesforce, ZenDesk, Jira, Xero, Splunk, Zapier, BigQuery, Microsoft Teams, Monday.com, Tableau, Power BI, Looker Studio	Cloud-Based. Export to various formats	Subscription-based
Ceiton	Web application	2001	Time-tracking and reporting, timesheets, invoicing. Full project support, integrated with workflow and long-term shift planning. Supports mobile devices.	Export to SAP, Microsoft Excel, CSV and pdf.	Web-based, MS SQL, Oracle.	License
Clarizen	Web application	2005	Collaborative project execution software. Clarizen’s Time Tracking features include cost and billing rates, timesheets, billing approvals process and time-tracking reports.	Integrate with Salesforce, Google docs, Microsoft Outlook. Mobile- iPhone/Android app	Export and import projects to and from Microsoft Excel	Subscription-based
Easy Redmine	Web application	2007	Project management and time-tracking software that integrates with Redmine. It supports Waterfall and Agile methodologies, provides public/private cloud and on-premises hosting, includes risk and resource management, mind maps, Gantt charts, a B2B-focused CRM module, integrates with MediaWiki and GitLab	Outlook plugin, data import from Redmine, Jira, Microsoft Project, Microsoft Excel, integrations using Zapier and Make,	MySQL database (Percona), Exports to PDF, Excel, CSV, iCal	Open Source
Everhour	Web application	2015	Team-oriented time tracking software that natively integrates into different project management systems. Includes project budgeting, resources planning, reporting and invoicing.	Asana, Basecamp, GitHub, Trello, Insightly, Xero, Pivotal Tracker, Jira, Teamwork, BitBucket, QuickBooks	Hosted. Export to Microsoft Excel, CSV	Subscription-based
Fanurio	Microsoft Windows, Mac, Linux, Java	2006	Invoicing, time tracking, billing	Address Book	HSQLDB	Subscription-based
FogBugz	Web application	2000	Automatic and manual time tracking, estimates, milestones, and reports.	Available in FogBugz Tasker, FogBugz Issue Desk, FogBugz Agile, and FogBugz Dev Hub.	Web-based, hosted.	Subscription-based
FreshBooks	Web application	2004	Invoicing, time tracking, online credit card and ACH payments, estimates, expenses, projects, staff and client management, double-entry accounting, personalized branding, customizable accounting and business reports and iPhone and Android apps.	Gusto, G Suite, FundBox, Stripe, Bookkeeping Express, Bench, HubSpot, Yearli, Piesync, Zapier, Hurdlr, Capsule, Revamp CRM, noCRM.io, OneSaaS, 123FormBuilder, Acuity Scheduling, Bidsketch, Avalara Trustfile, Partial.ly, AON, Boomr, Track, Projects, Asana, Basecamp, Everhour, Trello, EazyBI, Collbox, ProWorkflow, Expiration Reminder, Shopify, Enlighten.me, Skyvia, Klipfolio, AgileCRM, Barcloud, Wufoo, Eventbrite, Salesforce, Slack, Square, Freshdesk, Campaign Monitor, WooCommerce, Yalla, Constant Contact, Insightly, MailChimp, ZenDesk, HoneyBooks, Selz, BigCommerce, ToDoList, Artichoke, Calendly, WordPress, Meetup, Geckoboard, HappyFox, Magneto, Podia, Formstack, Gravity, InfusionSoft, Clio, Universe, Solve, Daycast, Intervals, SharpSpring, Prospero, Proposify, AWeber, Natero, Everlance, LiveChat, Teachable, Expensify, InView, Tangentia, Checkeeper, SherpaDesk, ClicData	Cloud-Based. Export to various formats	Subscription-based
Grindstone	Microsoft Windows	2008	Stopwatch, AFK detection, search tasks, profiles, custom fields, breakdowns, timesheets, invoices. After installation, a portable version can be generated, too.	Export to Microsoft Excel, PDF	XML	CC BY-ND 3.0 US
GroupOffice	Web application	2020	Time tracking and time-based reporting, timesheets, project budgeting, invoicing, expenses, CRM, groupware	Built as module for open-source platform	Hosted. Export to Microsoft Excel, CSV	Subscription- or license-based
Harvest	Web application	2006	Time tracking and reporting, timesheets, invoicing, expenses, project budgeting	iPhone, Android, Mac, Google Apps, Quickbooks, Xero, Basecamp, Trello, Asana	Hosted. Export to Microsoft Excel, CSV, Google Docs	Subscription-based
Instant	Web application, Mac, iOS, Android	2015	Automatically tracks time spent on phone usage, at places, while traveling, sleeping and fitness activities. With a chatbot coach, reports and goals. Used for consumers and employee wellness programs.	Can export CSV, integrates with Apple Health, Google Fit, Samsung S Health and Fitbit.	Locally stored on phone, can back up on iCloud or Google Drive	Subscription-based
LiquidPlanner	Web application	2008	Customizable activity codes, reviews, estimate trend charts, date drift trend charts, custom filtering, programming API, and export to XML, CSV, or to Quickbooks.	Fully integrated with the LiquidPlanner Project Management environment. Time tracking integrated with LiquidPlanner Analytics.	Export to Microsoft Excel, Quickbooks, or in CSV format.	Proprietary
ManicTime	Microsoft Windows, Mac	2008	Automatic time tracking software, which tracks computer usage and stores all data locally. It allows users to track time spent on various projects and tasks. When used on multiple machines, locally installed server generates combined reports, which are accessible with a web browser or sent by email.	Microsoft Office, JIRA, Moves app, Google calendar, FreshBooks, QuickBooks, Skype	SQLite, PostgreSQL, Microsoft SQL Server	Free or license-based
Redmine	Web application	2006	Project management and issue tracking with time tracking, forums, wikis, and project flows. Includes Gantt charts and a calendar.	IDEs, version control systems, mobile phones, and browsers.	SQLite, PostgreSQL	Open-source
Replicon	Web application	1996	Provides employee time tracking, project time tracking, expense tracking and scheduling. Includes text reports with custom columns, graphical reports, email reminders, multiple approval paths, time off calendar.	Quickbooks, Microsoft Project, ADP, Oracle, SAP, PeopleSoft, JD Edwards, Ceridian, WSDL/XML API, Mobile - iPhone/Android available	Hosted. Export to XML, Microsoft Excel, CSV, PDF	Subscription-based
Teamwork	Web application	2007	Complete web-based project management software with timesheet module, ASP available	MS Project, open source Java API	Any SQL compliant Database	Subscription-based
Tick	Web application	2006	Employee time tracking, instant budget feedback, reporting and invoice integrations. Edit time directly in Basecamp. Includes mobile apps, web app, chrome extension, REST API and more.	iPhone, Android, Apple Watch, Mac App, Chrome Extension, Zapier, Quickbooks, Freshbooks, Basecamp, Asana, Trello	Hosted. Export to Microsoft Excel, CSV, Google Docs FreshBooks, Basecamp and QuickBooks	Subscription-based
Time Clock Wizard	Web application	2014	Time Clock Wizard is a software, which includes a mobile app, that allows unlimited users and employees to work in a single schedule, whereas, optional services such as web design, merchant accounts and other business loans credit to the company's business model.	iPhone, iPad, CSV, email	Hosted	Subscription-Based
Time Doctor	Web application, Microsoft Windows, Linux, iOS, Android	2012	TimeDoctor is a time tracking and productivity tool which employs screenshots, website & application usage monitoring, keyboard & mouse activity, and task & project time logging. It also has web-based reporting.	Basecamp, Asana, JIRA, Podio, Teamwork.com, Slack, Trello, GitHub, and 20 others	Hosted and export options available	Free and subscription-based
TimeTiger	Web application	1998	Team and enterprise time tracking, project tracking, reporting, and analysis.	Bi-directional sync with MS Project, export to Excel and QuickBooks, integration SDK	Hosted	Subscription-based
Timewarrior	Linux	2008	Command line interface	JSON	File	MIT License
TMetric	Web application, Microsoft Windows	2016	User-friendly interface, Projects budgeting, Project management, Task and time-tracking, Invoicing, Billable time and rates, Detailed time and money reports, Task tags, Team management, Time-sheet export, Workday timeline, Downloadable version	Integrates with Asana, Basecamp, GitHub, Trello, Wrike, JIRA, GitLab and many more.	Web-based, hosted.	Free and subscription-based
Toggl	Web application, iOS, Android	2006	Toggl allows users to track the time spent on various projects and analyze productivity. It is cloud-based and can be up and running from scratch in less than a minute. You can use Toggl on the web, as a desktop widget or on your mobile – all your data gets synced in real time.	Export to Excel, FreshBooks, and Asana, Basecamp, GitHub, Teamweek integration SDK	Web-based, hosted.	Free and subscription-based
Tracker	Web application, Microsoft Windows, Mac, iOS, Android	2008	Includes a Web-enabled time reporting module, with automated approval routing and messaging.	Other Tracker Suite modules, Microsoft Project	Microsoft SQL	License-based
TSheets	Web application, iOS, Android	2008	Mobile time tracking, manual or automated time entry, employee job/shift scheduling, real-time GPS location tracking, customizable alerts & reminders, detailed reporting, invoicing, PTO & vacation tracking, kiosk functionality, open API, and more.	integrates with Intuit QuickBooks Online & Desktop, Xero, ADP, Gusto, Square, Expensify, and other payroll/accounting solutions.	Hosted. Export reports in CSV, PDF and others.	Free and Subscription-based
Xpert-Timer	Microsoft Windows, Android	1999	Native Project time-tracking software that includes a To-Do list, document management, client management and invoicing module in the PRO Version. The Windows version includes a time bar that floats on the Windows desktop that allows users to keep an eye on the time spent on a project. Multiple reports are included.	Bi-directional sync with Android XT MOBILE version, export to Excel and CSV. Full access to database.	MS Access, MySQL, Microsoft SQL (also Express)	License-based
ZipBooks	Web application, iOS	2015	Time tracking, flexible billing tracking, invoicing, credit card processing, recurring payments, late payment reminders, transactions, bank integration, bank account reconciliation, estimates, expenses, staff and client management, accounting, customer feedback, financial reports, 1099 contractor management, multiple currency support	iPhone, ZenDesk, G Suite, Chrome Web Store time tracking extension	Hosted. Export to various formats	Subscription-based
Zoho Projects	Web application, iOS, Android	2005	Project management software with a wide range of time tracking functionalities to record the start and end dates, calculate the time spent on tasks, differentiate billable and non-billable hours, generate invoices, and to establish and manage an approval process for timesheets. The time logging process can be automated by starting and stopping timers for tasks.	Integrates with Zoho Invoice, Zoho Books and enables export of timesheet data in xls/csv formats.	MySQL	Subscription-based

== See also ==
- Deployment management
- Flextime plan
- Project management software
- Timesheet
- Working time
