= Tick (software) =

Time tracking software

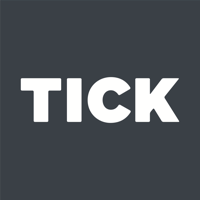
- Initial release: 2006
- Operating system: Web App; Microsoft Windows; Mac OS X 10.4
- Available in: English
- Type: Time tracking software
- License: Proprietary
- Website: tickspot.com

Tick is a time-tracking software operated by Higher Pixels (formerly The Molehill), headquartered in Jacksonville, Florida, specializing in online time tracking and reporting services.

== Features ==
Tick provides time tracking, management, and reporting services. API control is enabled for designers.

Tick features include:

- Manual time entry
- Timers
- Instant budget feedback in the timecard
- View and export reports
- Desktop App for Windows and Mac
- Apple Watch App
- Mac Widget
- Chrome Extension
- Native iPhone application and Android/Google application
- Integrates with Basecamp, Asana, and Trello.
- SSL encryption ensures outside sources are kept out
- Account administrators have full control over permissions and access levels
- Zapier Support
- Seamless invoicing options through QuickBooks or FreshBooks

== See also ==
- Comparison of time tracking software
- Project management software
