= Zempler Bank =

British challenger bank and prepaid card operator

- Trade name: Zempler Bank
- Formerly: Cashplus Bank
- Industry: Financial services
- Founded: June 2005
- Founder: Rich Wagner
- Headquarters: London, United Kingdom
- Area served: United Kingdom
- Key people: Dominic Wade (CEO), Mark Sismey-Durrant (Chair of Board), Adam McNichol (CFO)
- Products: Current accounts, Debit card, Business account, Credit card
- Services: Financial Services
- Number of employees: 300
- Website: www.zemplerbank.com

Zempler Bank, formerly known as Cashplus Bank is a British challenger bank headquartered in London. It provides digital business and personal current accounts in the United Kingdom, with a focus on micro-businesses, sole traders, freelancers and small and medium-sized enterprises (SMEs). It holds a full UK banking licence and is a participant in the Current Account Switch Service. Founded in 2005 as a prepaid card operator Cashplus, it was granted a full UK banking licence in 2021 and rebrand as Zempler Bank in 2024. In 2026 it was acquired by The Access Bank UK, the subsidiary of Nigeria's Access Bank, and now operates as an independent subsidiary.

== History ==
The company was launched in the United Kingdom in 2005 as Cashplus, initially providing prepaid payment cards before shifting its focus towards small businesses and start-ups.

It applied for a banking licence in 2017 and was granted a full UK banking licence in 2021, at which point it began trading as Cashplus Bank.

In July 2024, the bank rebranded as Zempler Bank, retaining founder Rich Wagner as chief executive.

== Acquisition by The Access Bank UK ==
In February 2026, The Access Bank UK agreed to acquire a 100% shareholding in Zempler Bank. The transition received regulatory approval from the Prudential Regulation Authority and the Financial Conduct Authority, and completed in 2026, after which Zempler began operating as an independent subsidiary of Access Bank UK. Reports valued the bank at around £80 million; commentators linked the lower valuation to pressure on UK SME lending.

== Products and services ==
Business Banking

Zempler Bank offers business current accounts aimed at sole traders, freelancers, and SMEs, managed digitally and supplied with a Mastercard debit card. Accounts include tools for invoicing, digital receipt capture and cash flow tracking and can be connected to third-party accounting software including Xero, QuickBooks, and Sage through Open Banking. The bank is one of the largest business current account providers covered by the Competition and Markets Authority's mandatory service-quality survey.

Personal banking and credit

The bank provides personal current accounts to personal customers across the UK, with features including an overdrafts facility. They also provide personal and business credit cards, subject to eligibility.

International payments

In April 2025, Zempler introduced an outbound international payments service for business customers through an integration with the Wise Platform, initially enabling transfers to USD accounts in the United States and EUR accounts in the SEPA region from within its app.

Mobile app and features

Zempler delivers its banking services primarily through mobile apps for iOS and Android. According to the company, features include real-time transaction notifications, the ability to set aside funds in separate "pots", and the option for business customers to issue employee cards with configurable spending limits.

Partnerships

Zempler's international payments capability is provided through a partnership with Wise. It has also announced partnerships with the lender iwoca, to widen access to SME finance, and with the accounting platform Coconut, to help sole traders prepare for Making Tax Digital for Income Tax..

== Mobile app and features ==
Zempler delivers its banking services primarily through mobile apps for iOS and Android. According to the company, features include real-time transaction notifications, the ability to set aside funds in separate "pots", and the option for business customers to issue employee cards with configurable spending limits.
