= TimeClock Plus =

Workforce management system

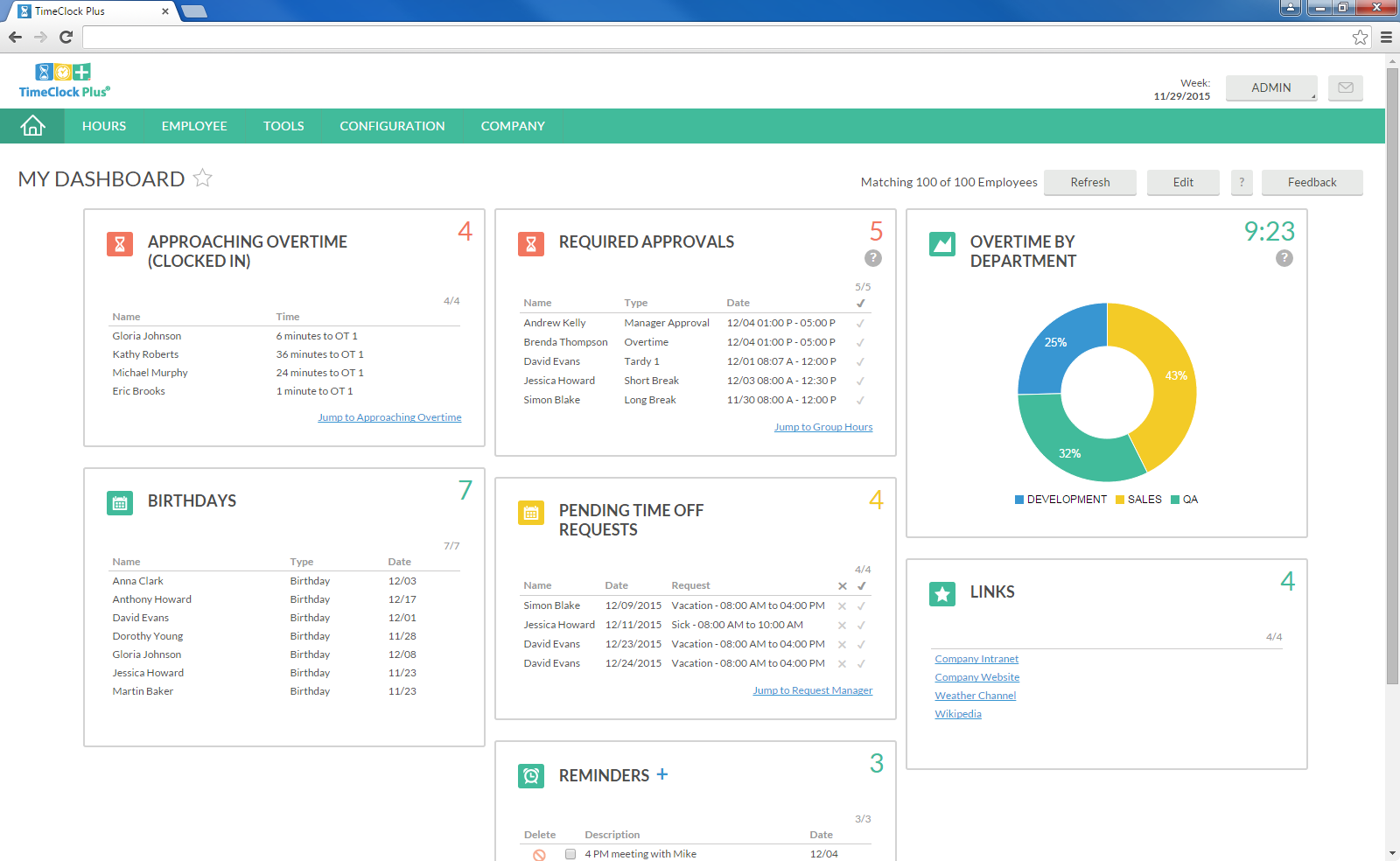
- TimeClock Manager's Dashboard
- Developer: Data Management Inc.
- Stable release: 7
- Operating system: Windows 7 and later
- Type: Time tracking software
- License: Commercial proprietary software
- Website: timeclockplus.com

TCP Software (TimeClock Plus, LLC) is a cloud-based time and attendance workforce management system founded in 1988 to serve the time-tracking needs of the restaurant industry. Developed as a DOS application, the system developed into a Windows application and transferred to a web application. The software is available under a SaaS and serves 30,000 customers on the public and private scale.

TCP produces workforce management software and hardware for time tracking, leave management, document management, and employee scheduling. Its applications integrate with third-party payroll and human capital management (HCM) systems.

TCP provides an array of time collection devices including biometric badge readers and a temperature reader (Thermal Sensor). The core Time Clock mounts to a wall and is configurable with multiple input methods including a touch screen and touch-less options. The MobileClock app and WebClock application enable employees to clock in and out while data is recorded in a Microsoft SQL database. TimeClock Manager is a web application for administrators to review hours, enter leave, run reports, and send hours to payroll.

== History ==
TCP Software (TimeClock Plus, LLC) was developed in 1988 and known as Data Management Inc. (DMI), which later became known as TimeClock Plus, LLC. The company name changed again with a rebrand in 2020. The software was originally written in DOS, and several versions were released up to 1994, with one in 1999 to fix the year 2000 problem. Versions were also written for SCO UNIX and IBM AIX. The first version of Microsoft Windows was released in 1994.

Until 2005, the software used a dBase-compatible database, but from version 5.0, it changed to Microsoft SQL. In 2006 the first web version was released as a simple, scaled-down version of 5.0 for Windows. This removed the need for a client installation and also made the system available to Macintosh users for the first time. In 2008, a complete web version of 5.0 for Windows was introduced.

In 2010, web version 3.0 was released with all the functionality of 6.0 for Windows. Later, TimeClock Plus Hybrid was released, which allowed 3.0 for the Web and 6.0 for Windows to operate together. This was followed by the SaaS model, TimeClock Plus OnDemand, which allows subscribers to use the application on a database hosted by Data Management Inc. at an SAS 70-compliant data center with encrypted data transmission and daily backups. Two new employee access points were introduced in 2011: an interactive voice response system and mobile applications that run on Android and iPhone.

In August 2011, a partnership was announced between TimeClock Plus and Windsor Management Group, which services "850+ school districts" around the country, to bundle TimeClock Plus with the financial and HR management solution, Infinite Visions. In September of that same year, TimeClock Plus announced that it had formed a partnership with the Texas Computer Cooperative (TCC), which provides administrative software to Texas schools.

In 2019, TimeClock Plus, LLC was acquired by Providence Equity Partners and the company rebranded to TCP Software for marketing purposes (the legal name remains as TimeClock Plus, LLC).

== Features ==
The TimeClock Plus v7 software includes several web applications.

The administrative application is TimeClock Manager where employees, managers, job codes, and business rules are created and maintained. Important information is reflected on the dashboard in interactive widgets. Tools are available to manage hours and leave requests, generate a report, determine job code status, and total hours for the day or week to prevent unnecessary overtime, send employee messages, build schedules, and track tips for service industries. The reports break down employee time, job codes, and other information in different ways.

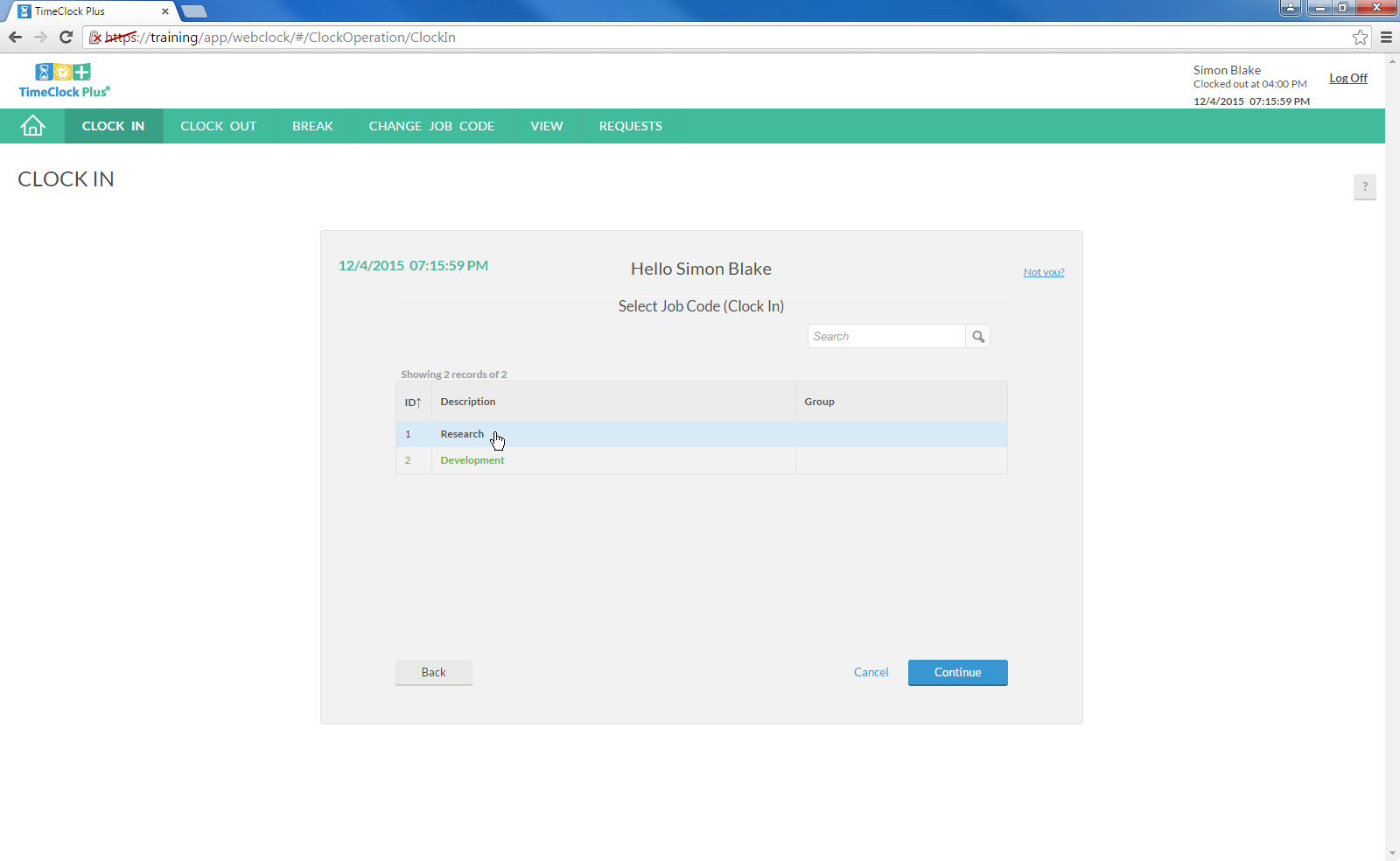
Clocking in on WebClock

WebClock is the interface used by employees to clock in, clock out, go on break, change job codes, and carry out other enabled tasks such as viewing and approving hours, viewing schedules, and entering time sheets or leave requests. Missed punches may also be enabled to save time when an employee forgets to clock in or out. Hardware is also available for clock operations involving a terminal that can be mounted on the wall, which is configured and controlled by another web application called Clock Hub.

Another web application is TimeClock Scheduler where schedules are created and maintained.

There are also over 100 payroll interface modules that can transfer hours to payroll systems.

In 2024, they adopted a new feature version number system for TimeClock Plus, it’s now on version 45.2

== See also ==
- NETtime Solutions
- Time clock
- Timesheet
