= CEITON =

Workflow management system for media industry

CEITON Digital Processes, Workflows & Scheduling
- Developer: Ceiton Technologies GmbH
- Initial release: 2001
- Stable release: 16.50 / 01.06.2025
- Written in: ASP.NET, JavaScript, XML
- Operating system: Windows, Mac OS X, Mobile OS
- Type: Business, Workflow, Scheduling, Accounting, Time tracking software
- License: Proprietary
- Website: ceiton.com

CEITON is a web-based software system for facilitating and automating business processes such as planning, scheduling, and payroll using workflow technologies. The system is used by several media companies such as MDR, Yle, RAI and Red Bull Media House. In December 2018, the first CEITON User Group Meeting took place in Leipzig, Germany.

== Architecture ==
The software runs on a server (on premises) or in the cloud and is scalable on parallel servers. Data security is warranted by role-based access control (RBAC). The software is used via web-browsers and not dependent on particular system software.

== Structure and Features ==
CEITON combines the two classical approaches of production planning and control and workflow management.

=== Project Management ===
The scheduling system plans, manages, bills, and analyzes projects or tasks. It manages human and technical resources, material, and locations on a single GUI. The system uses a gantt chart to assign tasks to be done to available and eligible resources (i.e. staff), automatically or by drag-and-drop.

The scheduling module includes material management, resource management/ human resource management, integration of freelancers, clients and suppliers, long-term budget planning, time-tracking, shift scheduling, quality management, delivery and logistics, document management, archive, analysis and controlling, business reporting, as well as all accounting and documentation processes.

=== Workflow ===
The workflow management system module coordinates business processes. Processes are defined once as a workflow and then repeatedly executed. Human resources are automatically assigned to steps (tasks) and integrated in workflow forms. Systems are integrated with an EAI/SOAP module, allowing data exchange with arbitrary external systems which are also involved in the business process. It also features a 3-D workflow overview in which the status of each project step can be determined by its color in the overview.

=== Process Management ===
For project and order processing management, business processes are designed as workflows, and coordinate communication automatically. Different user interfaces for staff, customers or suppliers can be created so each gets only relevant information. Different workflow forms are associated with different log-ins.

The main application for the system is knowledge-based business processes, in which many people are involved and virtual results are produced, e.g. in research, or development of media products, such as TV and movies. Broadcasters and media companies such as MDR and Yle use CEITON to control their production processes for products and services and coordinate complex workflows with all kinds of resources.

=== Integrations ===
An integrated EAI module allows CEITON to integrate every external system in any business process without programming, using SOAP and similar technologies. Aspera and FileCatalyst were integrated for faster data transfer, yet complex ERP systems and numerous SAP modules have also been integrated, for example, to extract working times to payroll.

=== Mobile Working ===
Since Version 7, released in 2015, CEITON includes a time-tracking module allowing employees to enter their times from mobile devices such as tablets running Android, iPhones etc.

== History ==
Ceiton Technologies (SME tech firm), the company developing CEITON, was founded in Leipzig, Germany in 2000, staffing solutions for the Bureau of Internal Revenue in Manila, Philippines, were implemented in 2000 together with the Deutsche Gesellschaft für Technische Zusammenarbeit of the German government. The first version (1.0) of the software was released in July 2001. The product was originally developed for German broadcasting companies.

CEITON is named after the Japanese concept Seiton, one of the principles of Japanese workplace design methodology known as 5S. Since version 7, released in 2015, CEITON includes a time-tracking module allowing employees to enter their times from mobile devices such as tablets running Android, iPhones etc.

In May 2005 CEITON won the IQ innovation award, sponsored by Siemens, in the category Excellent innovation in the IT-sector. Since 2007, CEITON has been present at the broadcast trade fairs NAB in Las Vegas and IBC in Amsterdam. In 2020, the company celebrated its 20th anniversary.

== See also ==
- Comparison of time-tracking software
- Employee scheduling software
- Time tracking software
- Schedule (workplace)
- Workflow
- Workflow engine
- Workflow management system
