= TSheets =

Time tracking software company

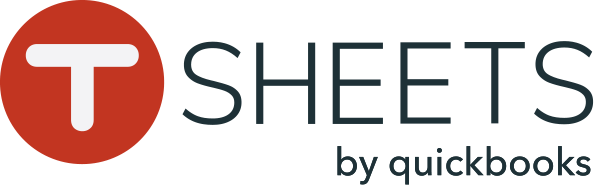
- Developer: TSheets
- Platform: Web platform, iOS, Android
- Type: Time tracking software
- Website: quickbooks.intuit.com/time-tracking/

TSheets was a web-based and mobile time tracking and employee scheduling app. The service was accessed via a web browser or a mobile app. TSheets was an alternative to a paper timesheet or punch cards.

== History ==
Based in Eagle, Idaho, TSheets was co-founded in 2006 by CEO Matt Rissell and CTO Brandon Zehm. In 2008, TSheets released a native employee time tracking app for the iPhone. In 2012, TSheets released an integration with accounting and payroll software QuickBooks. In 2015, TSheets accepted $15 million in growth equity funding from Summit Partners, bought a building in Eagle, Idaho, and opened a second location in Sydney, Australia.

On 5 December 2017, Intuit announced an agreement to acquire TSheets. The transaction was valued at approximately $340 million of cash and other consideration and closed on 11 January 2018. After the transaction closed, Time Capture became a new business unit within Intuit's Small Business and Self-Employed Group with Matt Rissell assuming the leader role reporting to Alex Chriss. TSheets's Eagle, Idaho site became an Intuit location.

== See also ==
- Comparison of time-tracking software
