= Time Clock Wizard =

Employee time tracking app

- Type: Private
- Industry: Human resource management
- Founded: February 2014
- Founder: Sean Wolf
- Headquarters: New York City
- Services: Employee time tracking, Timesheet
- Website: timeclockwizard.com

Time Clock Wizard, Inc is a New York-based online company known for its eponymous employee time tracking app.

== History ==
The company was founded in February 2014 by CEO Sean Wolf as a single-product venture.

Time Clock Wizard operates as a freemium software platform, including a mobile app that supports unlimited users and employees under a single schedule. Additional services—such as web design, merchant accounts, and business loans—are integrated into the platform's business model and accessible through the software dashboard.

The application also includes payroll functionality, enabling features such as payroll generation, overtime calculation, and reporting.

The company has been featured in various media outlets and reviews, including the Dr. Wright TV Show website in December 2014. It has also been listed among the "10 Best Time Tracking Apps for Designers & Developers".

== Features ==
The basic software application contains the following features:

- Schedule & task management
- Time and presence tracking
- Receive email or text alert for unscheduled time in or out
- GPS tracking via mobile app
- Photo capture
- Payroll management & reporting
- Reimbursements

== See also ==
- Comparison of time-tracking software
- Employee-scheduling software
- Project-management software
