= TMetric =

Time tracking software

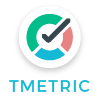
- Operating system: Web app, Microsoft Windows
- Type: time tracking software
- License: Proprietary software
- Website: tmetric.com

TMetric is time tracking software operated by TMetric team, headquartered in Prague, Czech Republic, that offers time tracking service for freelancers and small business owners who want to optimize their business processes and increase personal productivity.

== Details ==
The service was created for personal use to track time spent on tasks from RedMine and Jira. Now it supports much more integrations and released for a public use as simple task and time management application. TMetric now used by project managers and SMBs who measure budgets for their projects and get detailed time and money reports. Time entries is gathered via cloud service and displayed in a real-time.

== See also ==
- Comparison of time tracking software
