= Teamwork (disambiguation) =

Teamwork is the concept of people working together cooperatively.

Teamwork may also refer to:

- "Teamwork" (House), a season six episode of House
- "Teamwork" (Power Rangers), the third episode of Mighty Morphin Power Rangers' first season
- Teamwork (sculpture), a public artwork by Omri Amrany in Milwaukee, Wisconsin, US
- Teamwork (software), a web-based wide-scoped project-and-groupware management tool developed by Open Lab
- "Teamwork" (song), created for the musical production of Chitty Chitty Bang Bang
- "Teamwork", a song on the LazyTown soundtrack
- "Team Work", a song by Moka Only and LMNO from the album Lime Green, 2001
- Teamwork.com, a web-based project-management tool
