= Fanurio =

Time tracking and billing software

- Developer(s): Fanurio Time Tracking
- Operating system: Mac OS X, Windows, Linux
- Type: Time tracking software
- License: Commercial
- Website: Official website

Fanurio is a time tracking and billing software application developed by Fanurio Time Tracking, a company founded in 2006. It is developed in Java and it is mostly used by freelancers. The application is a "2 in 1" product allowing both time tracking and billing.

== Features ==
- Time tracking
- Billing
- Invoices
- Reports
- Address Book integration

== Integration ==
The applications runs on Java 1.4 or higher using Hibernate object/relational mapping with HSQLDB.

== See also ==
- Time tracking software
- Comparison of time tracking software
