= Instant (disambiguation) =

An instant is the shortest interval in time.

It may also refer to:

- Instant (app)
- Instant (album)
- Instant (Khalid song)
- Instant (Psy song)
