= Replicon =

Replicon may refer to:

- Replicon (genetics), a region of DNA or RNA that replicates from a single origin of replication
- Replicon (company), a software company providing timesheet and expense management software
