= TimeTiger =

Time and project tracking app

- Developer: Indigo Technologies Ltd.
- Initial release: April 15, 1998
- Platform: Web
- Available in: English
- Type: Time tracking software
- Website: timetiger.com

TimeTiger is a time and project tracking app developed by Indigo Technologies Ltd. in Toronto, Ontario, Canada. Indigo was founded in 1997 and initially released TimeTiger in 1998.

== Company ==
The company was incorporated in 1997 and began operations as a custom software developer. TimeTiger (internally called TaskMaster) was developed as a tool to help with Indigo's own project planning and estimating. After releasing TimeTiger as a commercial product in 1998, Indigo shifted its focus to time and project management solutions. TimeTiger first introduced support for web-based time logging in 2000, to appeal to workers who were not already tracking their time for billing reasons. Subsequent development emphasized project analysis tools.

== Features ==
- Web-based electronic time log
- "To Do" list to monitor project and non-project activities
- Pivot table report designer
- Role-based access control

== Software integration ==
Reports can be exported to Microsoft Excel or saved as Excel-compatible HTML files. Microsoft Project files can be imported and exported. A Software Development Kit is available.

== See also ==
- Comparison of time tracking software
- Productivity
