= ManicTime =

Automatic time tracking software

- Initial release: June 6, 2008; 16 years ago
- Stable release: v2025.1.6 / 9 May 2025; 4 days ago
- Operating system: Windows, macOS, Linux, Android
- Type: Time tracking software
- License: Proprietary software
- Website: www.manictime.com

ManicTime is automatic time tracking software, which tracks application and web page usage. Tracked data helps users keep track of time spent on various projects and tasks. It was developed by Finkit d.o.o., a company based in Slovenia.

== Details ==
ManicTime Client runs in the background and records applications, documents and web sites used by user. Collected data can then be used to keep track of time spent on various projects and tasks. All data is stored locally in SQL Server Compact database.

=== ManicTime Server ===
ManicTime Server was introduced in 2011. It collects data from ManicTime Clients and generates reports, which can be viewed with a web browser. ManicTime Server is an on-premises software and stores data in either SQLite, PostgreSQL or Microsoft SQL Server. Other applications can interact with ManicTime Server through SQL or JSON web service.

== See also ==
- Comparison of time tracking software
- Project management software
