= Tide (financial service) =

UK financial technology company

Tide Platform Limited
- Type: Private
- Industry: FinTech
- Predecessor: Starfish Platform Limited
- Founded: 18 May 2015; 11 years ago
- Founder: George Bevis
- Headquarters: London, United Kingdom
- Area served: United Kingdom
- Key people: George Bevis (founder), Oliver Prill (CEO), Sir Donald Brydon (Chairman)
- Products: Current accounts for small and medium-sized enterprises
- Services: Automated bookkeeping, integrated invoicing, financial services, accounting software integrations
- Number of employees: 250 (2020)
- Website: www.tide.co

Tide (Tide Platform Limited) is a UK financial technology company providing mobile-first banking services for small and medium-sized enterprises. It enables businesses to set up a current account and get instant access to various financial services (including automated bookkeeping and integrated invoicing).

Established in 2015, Tide is one of the first digital-only finance platforms in the UK to provide current accounts for businesses. As of 2020, it had offices in London (headquarters), Sofia (Bulgaria) and Hyderabad (India).

== History ==
Tide was founded by George Bevis, who previously worked as a banker. He was joined by the UK Government advisor, venture capitalist and founder of Passion Capital, Eileen Burbidge, who became the Chairman of Tide.

The company was registered on May 18, 2015. It received the Financial Conduct Authority’s permission to provide financial products and services in February 2016. Banking services are provided by PrePay Solutions, which is regulated by the Financial Conduct Authority. Tide became one of the first digital-only finance platforms in the UK to provide accounts for businesses.

In July 2016, the company received $2 million (£1.5 million) in seed funding from Eileen Burbidge’s Passion Capital, Robin Klein’s LocalGlobe, Zoopla’s founder Alex Chesterman, Wonga founder Errol Damelin and a number of other investors.

The Tide mobile app was in beta mode until the official launch in January 2017. In March 2017, the company opened a pop-up store at London’s Old Street station.

In July 2017, Tide secured an £11m series A investment from specialist fintech funds Anthemis and Creandum. Money was also raised from Tide’s existing investors, Passion Capital and LocalGlobe. Alongside this, Tide announced a partnership with European online lender iwoca, to initiate its first loan program. An integration named Tide Credit was launched in October 2017. Tide offered credit lending of up to £150,000 directly through the app.

In January 2018, the UK Financial Conduct Authority (FCA) granted Tide authorisation as an electronic money institution (Authorised Electronic Money Institution). In March 2018, Tide presented a new logo and launched several product features, including a new vertical card design, updated FreeAgent integration and Team Cards. Later in March 2018, George Bevis announced he intended to step down from his CEO role. In August 2018, Oliver Prill, former chief operating officer at German online lender Kreditech, joined Tide as CEO. Later in August 2018, Tide secured £8m in bridge funding from existing investors Anthemis, Creandum and Passion Capital, joined by new investor Augmentum Fintech.

In September 2018, Tide argued that just £65m of the total £775m Royal Bank of Scotland bail-out fund was available for non-deposit-taking firms. CEO Oliver Prill wrote to the Treasury urging it to change the rules for the contest. In January 2019, ClearBank announced a partnership with Tide to bid for a grant from Pool A of the Capability and Innovation Fund that formed part of RBS’s alternative remedies package. Later in February 2019, Banking Competition Remedies Ltd granted ClearBank £60 million in funding from Pool A of the Capability and Innovation Fund. This decision has been criticized by competitors, saying that Tide didn’t have a banking licence and stating that a £60 million grant was no more than a boost to Tide’s venture capital investors.

In February 2019, Tide backed calls for a financial services tribunal for small businesses to settle disputes with their lenders. In March 2019, the company announced plans to raise £60 million from investors. In October of the same year, the company raised £44.1m in Series B fundraising, with the SBI Group and Augmentum Fintech leading the funding round. This fundraising followed the appointment of Guy Duncan as CTO in September 2019. In September 2020, Tide appointed Sir Donald Brydon as its first independent Chair.

During the 2020 COVID-19 pandemic, a great many firms required funding to cope with the financial consequences of the pandemic and the lockdowns enforced by it. As a non-bank lender, it does not hold deposits but relies on money raised from investors. Tide lent over £50m to just under 2,000 small businesses under the BBL scheme but was forced to close applications in July after running out of funds.

Tide does not qualify for the Bank of England's term funding scheme aimed at small business lending, which enables banks to borrow cash to fund bounce back loans (BBLs) at a flat interest rate of 2.5%. The company "continued to ask" the government for access to Bank of England loans to fund further BBLs. The lack of available finance affected the 250,000 small and medium-sized businesses which were unable to use the BBL scheme earlier as they did not bank with any of the 28 accredited lenders.

== Products and services ==
Tide app for iOS, card overview (April 2019)

Tide has created a set of finance tools for small business owners. Customers can open business current accounts straight from their mobile phone by scanning an ID and are sent a Mastercard debit card to use for business transactions. Tide business service is available on iPhone and Android devices, and on desktop computers.

The firm also offers an automated bookkeeping service and integrated invoicing. Tide developed an API that allows integrations with the loan provider iwoca, and with accounting software such as Xero, FreeAgent, ReckonOne and Sage. Tide was one of five fintech disruptors to launch Xero Bank Feed integration, alongside Starling Bank, TransferWise, Revolut and Soldo.

Tide has partnerships with PayPoint and with the Post Office to facilitate cash deposit services.
