= Xpert-Timer =

Time tracking software

Xpert-Timer Software
- Company type: Private Company
- Industry: Software
- Genre: Project time tracking on Windows and Android
- Founded: 1999
- Founder: Andreas Spang
- Headquarters: Füssen, Bavaria, Germany
- Area served: Worldwide
- Products: Xpert-Timer Pro, Basic and Mobile
- Website: www.xperttimer.com

Xpert-Timer Software is a software development company based in Füssen, Bavaria, Germany. Xpert-Timer Software develops and distributes Xpert-Timer Pro, Xpert-Timer Basic and Xpert-Timer Mobile. They have added a work time tracking solution to their portfolio in 2024.

== History ==
Xpert-Timer Software was found in 1999 by Andreas Spang. The first couple of years the main product of the company was BackupXpress, which sold all over the world. Besides BackupXpress a project time tracking tool named "Project Timer" was developed and distributed as freeware. IconXpert and Xecutor were also developed and distributed worldwide. In 2005 the company decided to rename "Project Timer" to "Xpert-Timer", add multiple functions and start selling it worldwide in German and English. Since then, Xpert-Timer has grown significantly and serves over 3000 customers worldwide. The mobile version for Android was introduced in October 2010 and has been downloaded over 10.000 times worldwide so far. BackupXpress was taken off the market in 2010.

== Software ==
Xpert-Timer, available in the version Pro, Basic, Web and Mobile allows to track time on projects or tasks. Xpert-Timer Pro and Xpert-Timer Basic are Windows-based, Xpert-Timer Web runs in a browser and Xpert-Timer Mobile runs on Android devices. All versions are designed for tracking time on projects and/or tasks. All versions of the software include a To-Do List, the timestamp list and an activity report. Xpert-Timer Pro is multi-user compatible, while Xpert-Timer Basic is only available for single users. Xpert-Timer Pro allows a whole project team to track time on one and the same project. Multiple reports are included in the software. Timestamps for example can be grouped by user, project or by date and can be exported to Excel or .csv for further use. Xpert-Timer Pro can be extended with additional modules like e.g. a billing module to create offers, invoices, and reminders for clients. Also, there is a document management, client management and the synchronization option available in those versions.

=== Tracking Billable Time/Billing Rates ===
Xpert-Timer tracks time for billable or non-billable projects. Additionally, price lists are available. This allows different hourly rates of employees to be mapped to the projects.

=== Expense Tracking ===
Reimbursable expenses can be attributed to a particular project.

=== Timestamp reports ===
Xpert-Timer creates timestamps every time the start or stop button is pushed in the software. Manual entries are available, too. Timestamp comments can be added to every timestamp. Reports can be filtered by project, user, date or billing status. A customizable report to match your corporate identity is included.

=== Versions ===
Xpert-Timer Pro: Single & multi-user software, time tracking, time stamps with comments, client manager, document manager, activity report, to-do list, price lists, reminders, billing module (additional cost), reimbursables (additional cost), synchronization module for Android & Windows (additional cost), XTWeb for tracking time in your browser (additional cost)

Xpert-Timer Basic: Single user version, project time tracking, activity report, time stamps with comments, to-Do List, reminders.

Xpert-Timer Mobile: Project time tracking, to-do list, client management, synchronization option with Xpert-Timer Pro (additional cost), PDF-Reporting with signature option (additional cost), photo-upload to server (additional cost), NFC, QR-Code scan option to track time.

Xpert-Timer Web: Time tracking in an On-premise cloud. This version is an additional module to Xpert-Timer Pro. It lets you track time in your browser and therefore is available on all platforms.

=== Android version ===
Mobile users can synchronize data between the Xpert-Timer Mobile and Xpert-Timer Pro version. The interface is XTSyncServer, which acts as the interface between the two databases. Xpert-Timer is also a standalone App, so it does not depend on Xpert-Timer Pro and can be used itself as well.

=== Reports ===
Xpert-Timer includes preconfigured instant reports that support common needs to view time and expense data.

== See also ==
- Comparison of time tracking software
- Project management software
- Software as a service
- Time tracking software
- Web application
