= Jeff Seely =

Jeff Seely is the Chairman of the Space Needle Corporation. Prior to that he was the chief executive of Recruiting.com, Inc. from 2007 to 2010. He had been an executive in the securities industry, and was chairman and chief executive officer of ShareBuilder Corporation.

In 1999, Seely created ShareBuilder Securities as an online brokerage to serve middle market investors and to encourage people to start investing and save regularly. The firm managed over 2 million accounts when it was acquired in 2007. ShareBuilder's innovative method of aggregating customer trades and enabling automatic dollar-based investing was awarded a patent by the USPTO. He left the firm when ING Direct bought Sharebuilder in 2007.

Seely then joined Recruiting.com as CEO in 2007. He left the job-searching software service when it was sold to Jobing.com in 2010.

Seely served as a trustee on the Washington State Investment Board for 15 years until 2018, and was a Director of Concur until its sale in 2014. He previously served for 9 years as director of Delta Dental of Washington and as Chairman of Lighter Capital. He is currently a director of The Space Needle Corporation, 8 West Revolution Technologies (Cork, Ireland), SpringRock Ventures, Wood River Land Trust and KEXP-FM. He holds a BA degree from St. Lawrence University, 1976 and an MBA from Columbia University Graduate School of Business, 1980.

He is married to Kim Brown Seely.
