= Toggl Track =

Cross-platform time tracking app

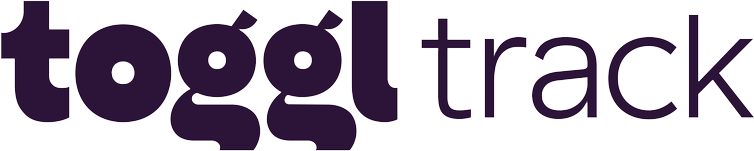
- Developer: Toggl OÜ
- Platform: Web, Windows 7 and later, macOS 10.11 and later, Linux (Flatpak), iOS, Android, watchOS
- Type: Time tracking software
- License: Proprietary server and website, open source desktop and mobile client apps
- Website: toggl.com

Toggl Track (formerly Toggl) is a time tracking software developed by Toggl OÜ which is headquartered in Tallinn, Estonia. The company offers online time tracking and reporting services through their website along with mobile and desktop applications.

Time can be tracked through a start/stop button, manual entry, or dragging and resizing time blocks in a calendar view.

== History ==
According to Alari Aho, Toggl's CEO and founder, the application has been fully self-funded from the start. The name was created using a random name generator.

== See also ==
- Comparison of time tracking software
- Project management software
