= ActivTrak =

Workforce analytics software

- Type: Private company
- Founded: 2009; 17 years ago
- Founder: Herb Axilrod, Anton Seidler
- Headquarters: Austin, Texas, United States
- Key people: Heidi Farris, CEO
- Services: SaaS, workforce analytics software
- Website: www.activtrak.com

ActivTrak is an American company that produces employee monitoring software used for workforce analytics on employee and company productivity. The company was founded in 2009 by Birch Grove Software and is headquartered in Austin, Texas.

By 2020, the company had raised US$77.5 million in funding and was backed by Sapphire Ventures and Elsewhere Partners.

== History ==
Birch Grove Software was established in 1995, and its products were Screen Pass (a Windows screen saver that administrators could unlock) and a utility software named Link-Launch. In about February 2009, they launched CapTrak, an employee monitoring system which was renamed ActivTrak a few month later and they founded a company with the same name. At first, ActivTrak was a LAN-based product for monitoring employee productivity but by 2013 it was provided to customers as a cloud-based software as a service.

In 2019, ActivTrak raised $20 million in a Series A round of funding with Elsewhere Partners, a growth-stage venture capital firm that principally invests in business-to-business startups. Elsewhere Partners stated they supported moving the company's headquarters to Austin, while still maintaining an office in Dallas. Rita Selvaggi assumed the role of CEO. In 2020, ActivTrak raised $50M in a Series B round of funding with Sapphire Ventures and Elsewhere Partners.

== Product ==
ActivTrak is a cloud-based workforce analytics and productivity platform that uses reports, dashboards, and data analysis. It captures desktop activity logs and provides dashboards and reports showing workers’ web usage, application usage, and time categorized as “productive” or “unproductive.” The software can capture screenshots, block websites, and create alarms for suspicious activity.

In general, what's called "worker surveillance systems" are agent-based systems; that is, they collect a lot of data by installing a piece of software on the workers' computers, tablets, and smartphones. The ActivTrak Agent runs in the background and collects data. It responds to user activity, sensing mouse and keyboard movement in the active window(s) of the user's device; it does not use keystroke logging, content scraping, camera access, video recording, or mobile device monitoring and it excludes data about non-business activities and sensitive information, in accordance with CCPA, GDPR, HIPAA, and SOC 2 Type 2 requirements.

The platform uses machine learning (AI) to collect and analyze user activity data, producing reports and productivity benchmarks that allow employers to compare individual and team performance against organizational averages.

=== Research from aggregated data ===
In October 2020, the company introduced the ActivTrak Productivity Lab to conduct research using the aggregate data they collect from their customers. Some of the research is published in annual "State of the Workplace" reports. For example, the 2025 report found that the traditional workday is 7% shorter than in 2022 but productivity increased by 2%, with remote workers having higher productivity than hybrid or in-office workers; and in 2023 they stated that corporations with 4-day workweeks were not operating efficiently, with workers spending less time on their tasks per week, but also that people were working more hours on the weekend.

== Awards ==
ActivTrak has appeared on the Deloitte Technology Fast 500 and Inc. 5000 lists.

== See also ==
- Time Doctor
- Toggl
