= NETtime Solutions =

Software company

nettime solutions
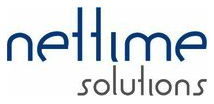
- Industry: Software
- Founded: 1996 as Vitrix, Inc.
- Founder: Bahan Sadegh
- Headquarters: Scottsdale, AZ
- Key people: Bahan Sadegh, CEO; Jonathan Weiss, VP of Business Development; Tom Klitzke, CFO
- Products: stratustime, netone, nettime
- Parent: Paychex
- Website: www.nettimesolutions.com

nettime solutions (originally Vitrix Inc.) is an American software company based in Scottsdale, Arizona. The company produces time and attendance software for businesses. The software is developed to help companies keep track of labor management data in real time. The software is intended to help compliance with local, state, and federal labor laws. In 2010, the company's software as a service handled over $3 billion in payroll.

== History ==
During the dotcom boom in 1995, Bahan Sadegh decided to start a business that wrote software for biometric devices. Sadegh, was then a senior at Arizona State University. The goal at the time was to help businesses manage their employee's hours, vacation time, sick leave, and pay schedule with web-based software that was simple to use.

In 1996, the company was incorporated in Scottsdale, Arizona as Vitrix Inc. Vitrix (a contraction of "vital biometrics") developed software controlling biometric devices in two forms. The first was time and attendance software, and the second was day care center software that generated a receipt for parents to pick up their children.

Time and attendance soon began generating the majority of the company's revenue, and in 1997 the company's board decided to focus on developing time and attendance software. In 1998, Vitrix acquired Time America, keeping Time America's name because of the brand's recognizability to consumers.

In 2000, the software NETtime (originally named myVitrix) was developed as software as a service (SaaS). It was the first completely browser-based time and attendance software on the market. The SaaS delivery had originally been conceived in 1998. Because the market in 2000 was not largely familiar with SaaS, the NETtime software was sold as both hosted and on-premises versions.

SaaS began increasing in popularity and usage in the late 2000s, partly because it reduces infrastructure costs. Likewise, NETtime's SaaS software became popular with companies for reducing hardware, not having upfront expenses, being scalable, ease of technical support, and the fact that it works on any operating system.

The business divested Time America in 2007, and nettime solutions became a private company focused on the SaaS NETtime model. In 2008, management decided to sell only the SaaS version.

In 2014, nettime was acquired by Rochester, New York based payroll company, Paychex.

== Products ==
NETtime is a SaaS time and attendance program that is compatible with machines running Windows, OS X and Linux using Internet Explorer, Firefox, Safari, Google Chrome and Opera. NETtime uses "dynamic billing," where organizations are billed only for employee actions that generate a timecard. Companies pay a per-employee-per-month (PEPM) charge to use the system.

Because the system is hosted, no software installation is needed. It is sold as white-labeled software for larger companies. NETtime also is used by professional employer organizations (PEO), payroll providers, and human resource information system (HRIS) companies.

The netone clock developed by nettime solutions uses "true push technology" to connect directly to the NETtime service. The direct communication eliminates the need for a dedicated computer to collect and transmit punches. It provides real-time data collection and reporting as well as employee self-service features.

== Impact on time and attendance industry ==
According to the company, the manual tracking of an employee's worked, vacation and sick time increases a company's risk of being out of compliance with labor laws. Violations of wage and hour reporting can leave a company open to legal action from both employees and government agencies, and therefore automated time and attendance programs reduce risk.

nettime solutions has also claimed that additional benefits include increased efficiency in the human resources and payroll departments, increased employee morale, elimination of wage theft from off the clock work or buddy punching, elimination of unearned paid time off, and consistent enforcement of in-company policies.

== Affiliations ==
- Better Business Bureau (BBB)
- American Payroll Association
- International Facility Manager Association
- National Association of Professional Employer Organization
