= Grindstone (time-tracking software) =

Time tracking software by Microsoft

- Developer: Epiforge Software
- Release: October 10, 2008
- Stable release: 4.0.2020.03.16-2 / March 16, 2020
- Operating system: Microsoft Windows
- Available in: English
- Type: Time Management
- License: Freeware
- Website: epiforge.com/Grindstone/

Grindstone is a freeware Microsoft Windows desktop application that allows users to create and organize tasks and to track time. The application features a Task List window for managing tasks and time, a desktop gadget-like stopwatch for controlling the timer, and can produce reports and detect when the user is away. In addition, Grindstone can synchronize time tracking data for multiple users via a paid service called Task Force.

== History ==
Grindstone versions
Version	Date
1.0	2008-10-10
2.0	?
3.0	?
3.1.5575	2015-04-08
4.0.2020.03.16-2	2020-03-16

== Reviews ==
PCWorld's review of Grindstone 2 focused on its functionality and features, calling them "incredibly simple, yet incredibly efficient." However, PCWorld's editors did indict Grindstone 2 for having a less than entertaining graphical user interface. "Once you delve into the app, its power becomes apparent, as does it ability to help you manage your time, but with its bland design, Grindstone can feel about as appealing as work."

== See also ==
- Comparison of time tracking software
- Timesheet
