= ZipBooks =

American accounting software company

ZipBooks Accounting
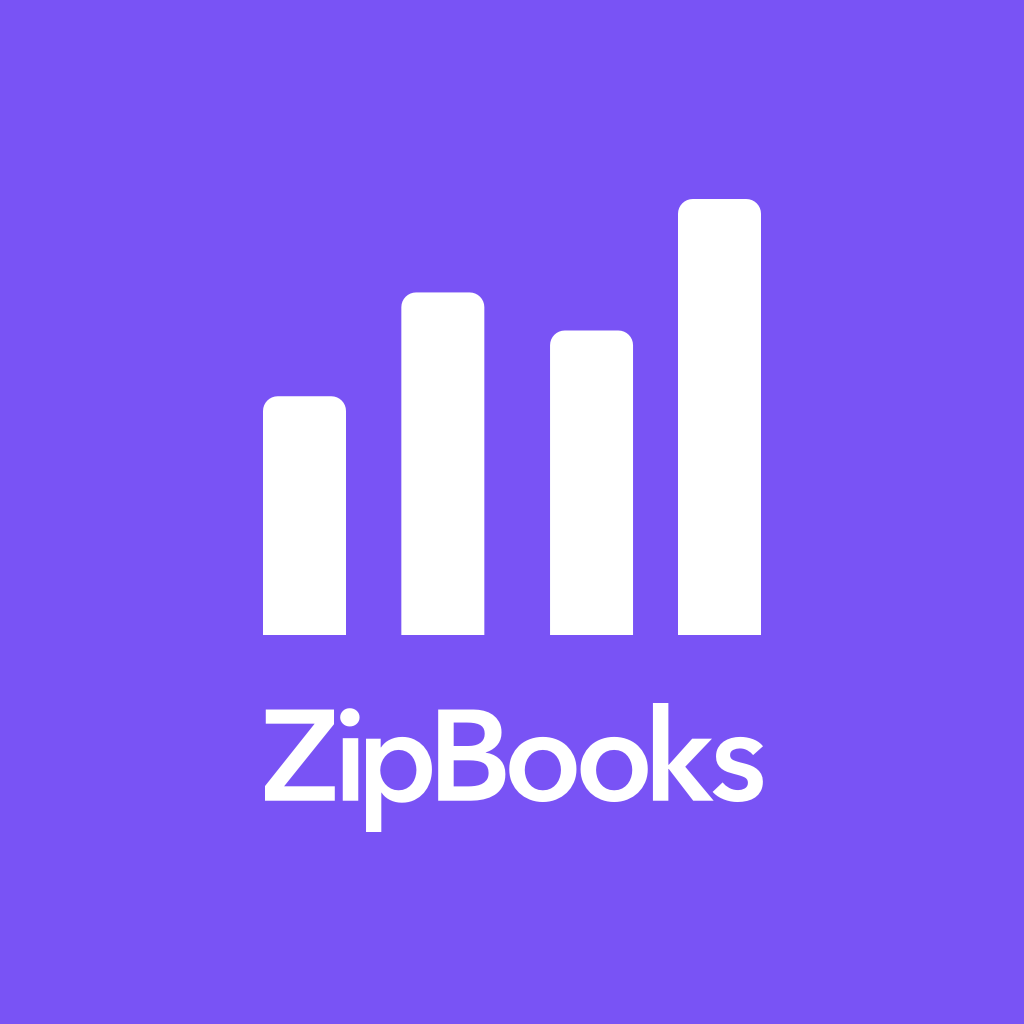
- Developer: ZipBooks
- Release: June 2015; 11 years ago
- Stable release: 2017
- Preview release: 2017
- Operating system: Windows, macOS, iOS, Android
- Platform: Web, iOS
- Available in: English
- Type: Accounting software
- License: Proprietary
- Website: zipbooks.com

ZipBooks is a free online accounting software company based in American Fork, Utah. The cloud-based software is an accounting and bookkeeping tool that helps business owners process credit cards, track finances, and send invoices, among other features.

== History ==
ZipBooks was founded by Tim Chaves in June 2015, backed by venture capital firm Peak Ventures. The company secured an additional $2 million of funding in July 2016, and in 2017 it was awarded a $100,000 economic grant by the Utah Governor's Office of Economic Development Technology Commercialization and Innovation Program.

== Products ==
ZipBooks' core modules are invoicing, transactions, bills, reporting, time tracking, contacts, and payroll. Accrual accounting was added in 2017.

The application is available on G Suite, iOS, Slack, and as a web application.

== Reception ==
Computerworld compared ZipBooks favorably with other accounting software. PC Magazine praised its user experience, but stated it lacked "a lot of features that competing sites offer".

== See also ==
- Comparison of accounting software
- Double-entry bookkeeping system
- Software as a service
- Time tracking software
- Web application
