= Insightly =

American computer technology company

Insightly, Inc.
- Type: Private
- Industry: Software
- Founded: 2009; 17 years ago in Perth, Western Australia, Australia
- Founder: Anthony Smith
- Headquarters: San Francisco
- Products: CRM software
- Number of employees: 190 (2018)
- Website: https://www.insightly.com

Insightly, Inc. is a private computer technology company headquartered in San Francisco, California.

== Products ==
The company develops cloud-based customer relationship management (CRM) and project management tools for small and medium size businesses. Insightly distributes its CRM and project management tools to customers using a freemium model.

== History ==
The company was founded in Perth, Australia, by Anthony Smith in 2009. The Insightly CRM platform was designed to integrate with Google Apps products. In 2012, the company relocated to San Francisco, where it raised $3 million in funding led by Emergence Capital Partners. Insightly used the funding to develop its CRM tools outside of the Google Apps platform, so that it could be an independent CRM. In December 2012, Insightly released its CRM app for iOS devices. In June 2013, the company launched integration between Microsoft Office and Outlook.

In September 2013, Insightly raised $10 million in Series B funding from Emergence Capital Partners, Sozo Ventures and TrueBridge Capital Partners. The company had over 184,000 customers in 100 countries. The company released an update to its user interface and simplified integration between Apps in 2014. In October 2014, Insightly announced integration with Dropbox and QuickBooks Online.

Insightly announced a partnership with cloud accounting software company, Xero, in 2015. In 2016, Insightly raised $25 million in Series C funding led by Scott Bommer, CEO of SAB Capital Management, as well as earlier investors in the company. In July 2016, Insightly also added Microsoft Power BI integration and updated its lead assignment rules. Insightly added CRM security features to its platform allowing clients to protect sensitive information, recover deleted data, and track changes to sales opportunities in October 2016. The features comply with the standards developed by the American Institute of Certified Public Accountants. In December 2016, the company added workflow automation tasks to its platform and expanded its mobile application's search reach, allowing integration with Dropbox, Google Drive, OneDrive, PandaDoc and Evernote. In 2016 the special business card scanning app Business Card Reader for Insightly CRM developed by one software company appeared on Google Play and Call Tracker for Insightly CRM in 2017.

As of April, 2016, the company had raised $40 million in funding. In July 2017, Insightly released a new version of CRM Suite featuring Microsoft Outlook integration and a new user interface.

In September of 2019, Insightly adding a marketing automation application to the platform.

In 2021, Insightly launched an integration tool called AppConnect and a customer service ticketing tool called Insightly Service.

Shortly after instituting a work from home policy in March 2022 for the COVID-19 pandemic, Insightly announced it would be permanently be a fully remote workforce.

In July 2024 Insightly was purchased by Private Equity company CrestRock Capital and subsequently merged with Marketing company Unbounce.
