= Kim Brown Seely =

American writer

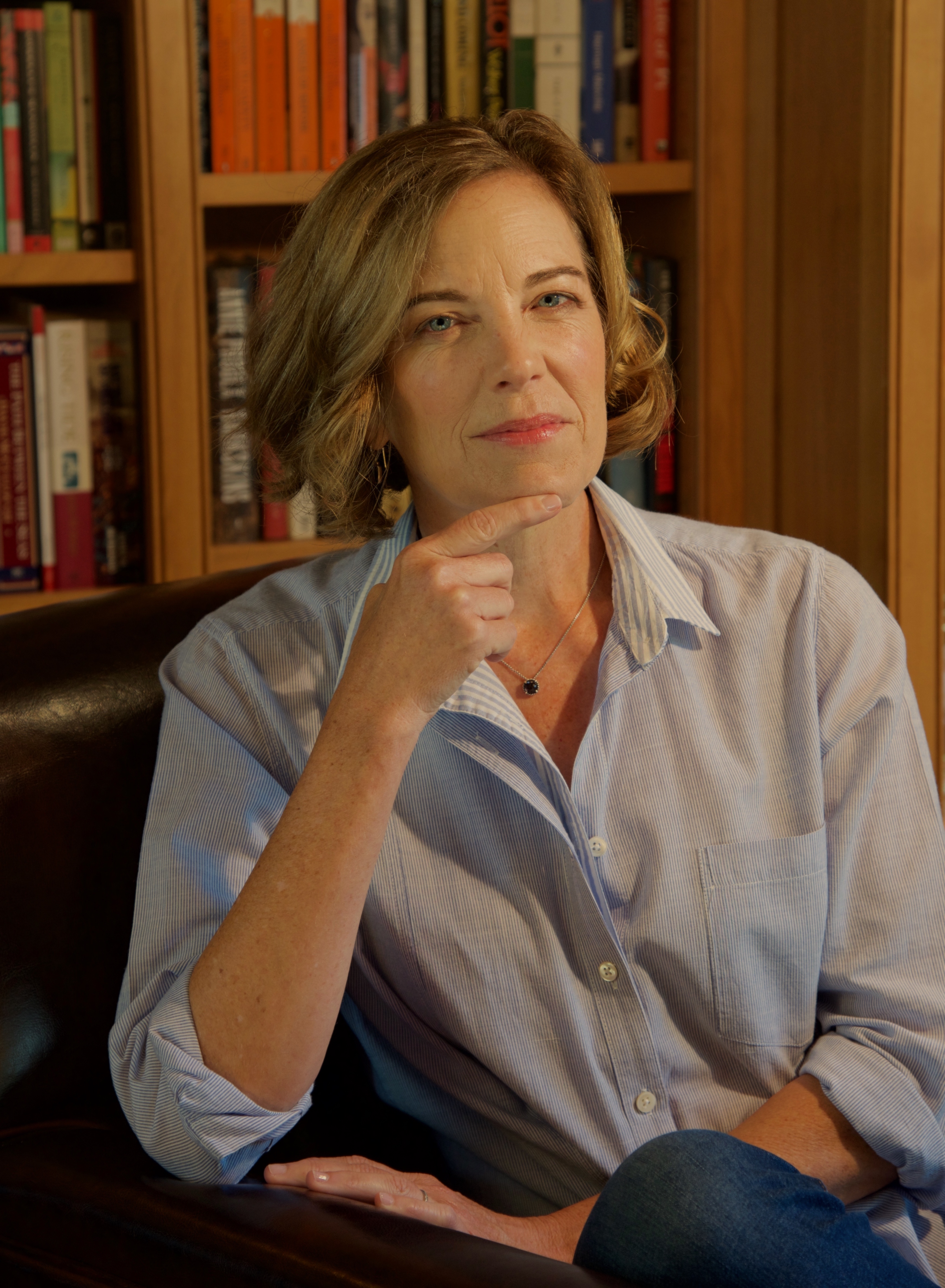
- Seely, 2019 Portland Book Festival
- Born: Kimberly Allyson Brown; June 25, 1961 (age 64) California, United States
- Occupation: Journalist, author
- Spouse: Jeff Seely

Website
- kimbrownseely.com

Kim Brown Seely (born Kimberly Allyson Brown; 1961) is an American author, writer of travel and adventure, and a 2016 Lowell Thomas Travel 'Journalist of the Year.' She is the author of the memoir Uncharted: A Couple’s Epic Empty-Nest Adventure Sailing from One Life to Another. Her book was given the Silver Award in the 2019 Nautilus Book Awards. She has published articles in magazines including Travel + Leisure, Town & Country, National Geographic Traveler, Virtuoso Travel & Life, Sunset, Coastal Living and Outside. She lives in Seattle, Washington.

== Personal life ==
Seely was born and grew up in southern California. After graduating from Stanford University she moved to New York City and began her career as a journalist. She joined Travel & Leisure magazine where she became Senior Editor. She subsequently became Senior Editor of Mungo Park, the first online adventure travel magazine published by Microsoft, and later served as the travel books editor at Amazon.com. She was a contributing editor at National Geographic Adventure magazine. Seely is a member of the board of directors of Copper Canyon Press, an independent, non-profit publisher of poetry based in Port Townsend, Washington and winner of the 2019 National Book Award for Poetry. She also served on the board and was Board President for Seattle Arts & Lectures. Kim is married to Jeffrey T. Seely. They have two sons.

== Memoir ==
Uncharted: A Couple’s Epic Empty-Nest Adventure Sailing from One Life to Another, Sasquatch/Penguin Random House, 2019 ISBN 9781632172556
