= Eileen Burbidge =

American venture capitalist (born 1971)

Eileen Burbidge MBE
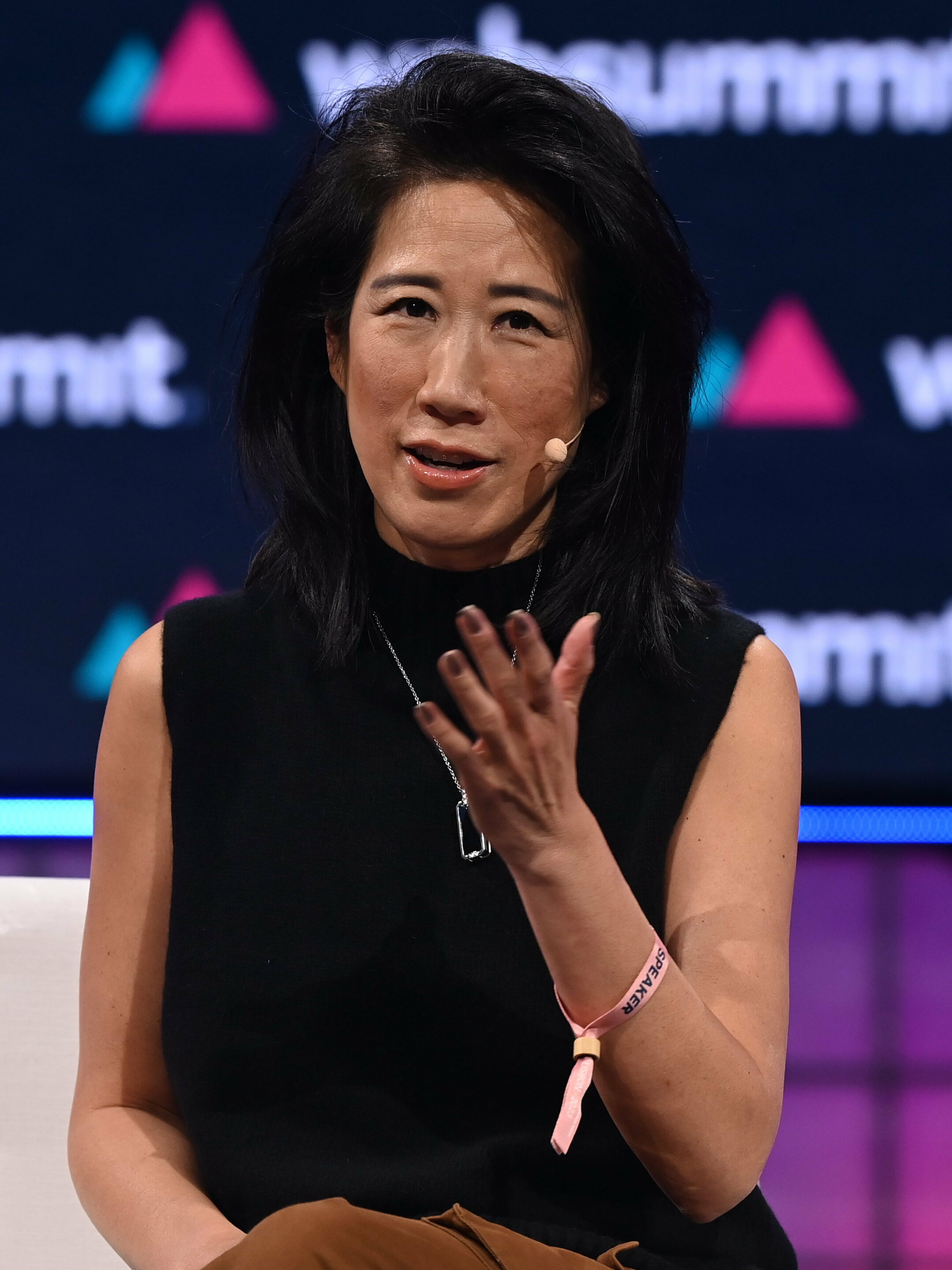
- Burbidge in 2023
- Born: 16 June 1971 (age 55); Chicago, Illinois, US
- Education: University of Illinois Urbana-Champaign (BS)
- Occupation: Businesswoman
- Title: Founding Partner, NFG Ventures and Passion Capital

Eileen Burbidge MBE (born 16 June 1971) is a British-American venture capitalist based in London, UK. She is a founding partner of NFG Ventures and of Passion Capital, an early-stage venture capital firm that has invested in Monzo, GoCardless, Round Treasury, Tide and Marshmallow.

== Early life and education ==
Burbidge was born on 16 June 1971 in Chicago to a civil engineer father and a mother who worked in finance. She was educated at Naperville Central High School and graduated from the University of Illinois at Urbana-Champaign in 1993 with a Bachelor of Science in computer science.

== Career ==
Burbidge started her career working as an engineering associate at GTE and Verizon Wireless. She then worked in marketing roles at Apple and Sun Microsystems. She had brief stints as business development director at Openwave followed by the 12 Entrepreneuring incubator. In 2004 she moved from the United States to London to pursue a career with Skype. After working at Skype, Burbidge launched Passion Capital, an early-stage London venture capital firm, with Stefan Glaenzer in 2008.

In 2015, Burbidge was appointed Member of the Order of the British Empire for services to entrepreneurship in the New Year honours list.

In July 2015, Burbidge was appointed as the British Treasury's "special envoy" for fintech. In September 2015, Burbidge was also appointed Chair of Tech City UK, the government-backed organisation supporting digital businesses across the UK, succeeding Baroness Joanna Shields. The organisation was relaunched as Tech Nation in 2017.

In November 2018, Burbidge was named to the Financial Times' list of the 'Top 100 minority ethnic leaders in technology'.

In January 2019, Burbidge joined the board of Dixons Carphone (now Currys plc) as a non-executive director.

In January 2020, Burbidge stepped down from the Tech Nation chairmanship after four and a half years in the role, and was succeeded by Stephen Kelly. In October 2020, Burbidge was added to Computer Weekly's Most Influential Women in UK Tech Hall of Fame.

In 2022, Burbidge became executive director of Fertifa, a UK fertility and reproductive health benefits company that had previously received investment from Passion Capital.

In 2023, Burbidge appeared on the Forbes Midas List Europe of top European tech investors.

In 2026, The Sunday Times profiled Eileen Burbidge and the launch of NFG, highlighting her return to early-stage investing with a new £20 million vehicle focused on backing founders at the very earliest stages. Burbidge secured an anchor investment from venture capital firm Thema, alongside a Singapore-based family office. The fund will take a founder-friendly approach, seeking entrepreneurs whose projects might otherwise be overlooked amid the current rush by venture investors towards AI specialists.

== Personal life ==
Burbidge has also used the names Eileen Tso and Eileen Broch, her maiden name and her name from a previous marriage, respectively.

Burbidge is twice divorced. She separated from her first husband around 2004. From her second marriage, she has three sons and a daughter, and with her current partner, she also has a stepdaughter.
