= Time Doctor =

SaaS time tracking and productivity tool

- Developer: Time Doctor, LLC
- Operating system: Windows, Macintosh, Linux, Android, iOS
- Available in: English, Russian, Spanish, Portuguese
- Type: Time tracking software
- License: Proprietary
- Website: www.timedoctor.com

Time Doctor is a SaaS workforce analytics and productivity platform used by organizations to analyze employee work activity and productivity across remote, hybrid, and in-office teams. The software provides monitoring, reporting, and analytics tools designed to support workforce visibility and operational oversight.

== History ==
Time Doctor was launched in 2012 by entrepreneurs Rob Rawson and Liam Martin. The software was developed to monitor and manage the productivity of distributed teams.

In 2013, the company released its initial desktop applications for Windows and macOS.

By 2015, the platform introduced integrations with project management tools such as Asana and Trello. In March 2015, 3 years after it was launched, Time Doctor exceeded 1 million hours tracked per month in 109 countries.

In 2018, Time Doctor launched mobile applications for iOS and Android. In 2023, the company added AI-assisted productivity insights to its platform.

== Products and services ==
Time Doctor provides workforce analytics and productivity software designed to help organizations analyze employee work activity. The platform collects and analyzes work activity data, including application and website usage, and presents this information through reporting and analytics tools.

The software integrates with third-party business systems such as payroll, project management, and human resources platforms.

== Company ==
Liam Martin and Rob Rawson are the co-founders of Time Doctor. Time Doctor has over 140 employees in more than 30 different countries.

== Awards and recognition ==
In 2025, Time Doctor received three awards at the International Business Awards: Gold for Thought Leader of the Year (Liam Martin), Silver for Achievement in Technology Innovation for the Unusual Activity Report (UAR), and Bronze for Brand & Experiences for Running Remote. In the same year, it was named “Time Tracking Solution of the Year” at the RemoteTech Breakthrough Awards and “Bootstrapper of the Year” at the Tekpon Awards, and was ranked among the Top 100 Flexible Employers by Jobgether.

In 2026, the company received a Gold award for Excellence in Work Management & Project Management from the Impact Reworked Awards.

== Privacy and regulation ==
In December 2024, France’s data protection authority, the Commission nationale de l'informatique et des libertés (CNIL), fined a real estate company €40,000 for implementing excessive employee surveillance practices that involved the use of Time Doctor. The CNIL’s decision focused on the employer’s configuration and use of monitoring tools, emphasizing principles of proportionality and transparency under data‑protection law, rather than declaring the software itself unlawful.

== See also ==
- Comparison of time tracking software
- Employee monitoring software
