= Data Management Inc. =

American corporation in San Angelo, Texas

- Company type: Private
- Industry: Computer software Digital distribution
- Founded: September 12, 1988
- Founder: Jorge Ellis
- Headquarters: San Angelo, Texas, US
- Area served: Worldwide
- Website: www.timeclockplus.com

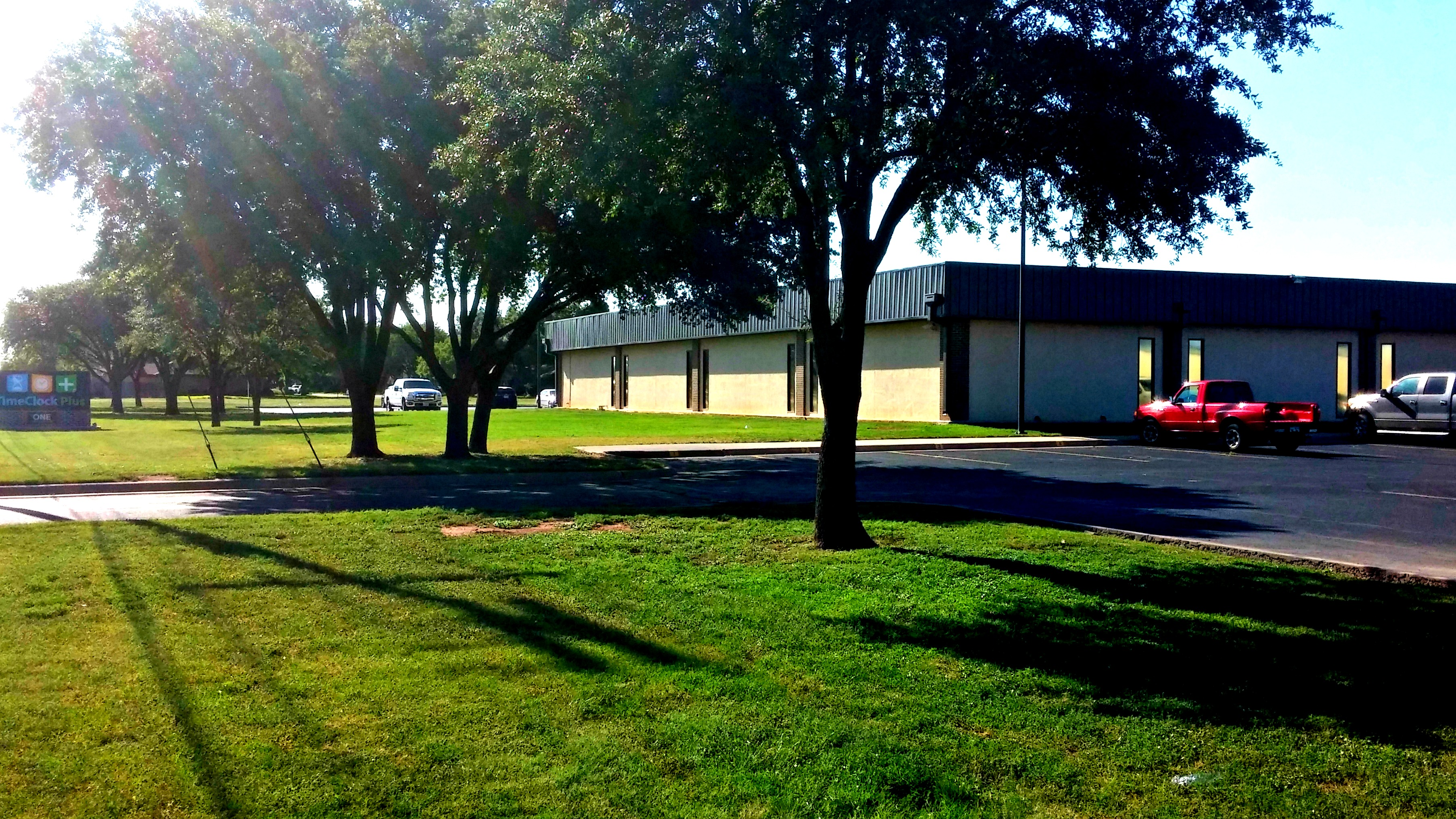
Data Management Inc.

TimeClock Plus LLC. (TCP), formally Data Management Inc. (DMI), is an American corporation in San Angelo, Texas. It was founded by Jorge Ellis in 1988 and specializes in business software development, particularly for time and labor management. Its flagship product is TimeClock Plus, a computerized time and attendance system.

The company originally developed the "One Number Delivery System" software for food delivery services. Through his business with retailers, Ellis discovered a growing need to track time and attendance: "'No one could tell me at any given minute what the [labor] costs were. I decided to develop a software package that would give a 24-hour picture.'" The system developed by DMI, called TimeClock Plus, was written for companies as small as five employees or as large as 750 and larger.

In April 2011, the San Angelo Standard Times reported that about 50,000 companies were using the system including Boeing, Harley Davidson, Ford Motor Company, Dial, and Sara Lee.

== Awards ==
Data Management Inc. was listed among the Deloitte Technology Fast 500 in 2004, 2005, and 2006.

DMI was also selected by CIO Review for the 50 most promising education technology solution providers in 2015.
