= Replicon (company) =

Canadian software company

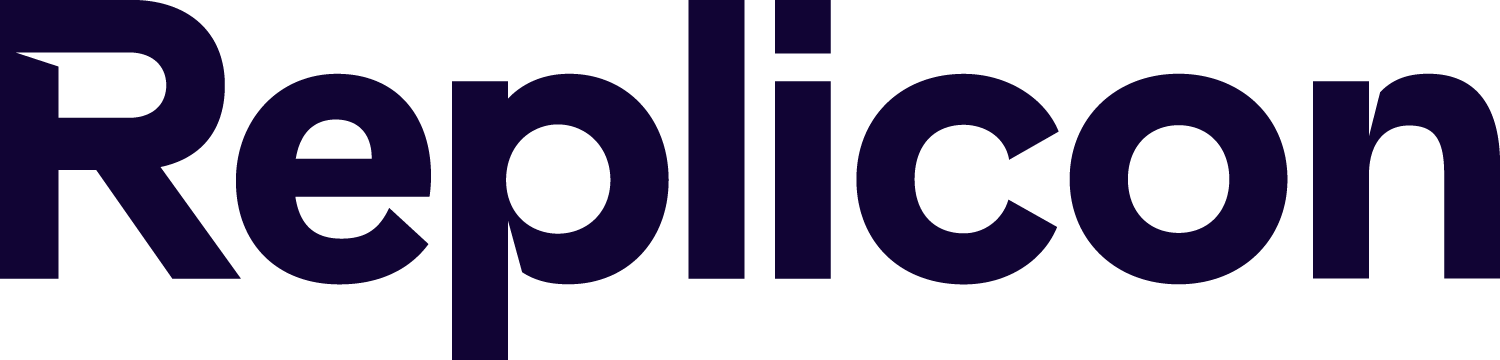
- Type: Private
- Industry: Software
- Founded: 1996
- Founder: Raj Narayanaswamy, Lakshmi Raj
- Headquarters: Calgary, Alberta, Canada
- Area served: Worldwide
- Products: Time sheet software, Polaris a self-driving Professional Services Automation (PSA)
- Parent: Deltek
- Website: www.replicon.com

Replicon is a Calgary-based software-as-a-service (SaaS) company that makes software for time tracking, advanced project management, task collaboration, resource allocation, and professional services automation. Its online timesheets and cloud clock are an alternative to paper timesheets or punch cards.

On August 23, 2023, Deltek announced that it had completed the acquisition of the company.

== History ==
Replicon was co-founded in 1996 by Raj Narayanaswamy and Lakshmi Raj in Calgary, Canada. The company expanded its presence globally over the years and has set up major offices in other countries.

The founders reckoned that simple everyday processes like time sheet management and expense reports cause major problems and hence went about building web-based applications to relieve the stress on businesses and optimize workforce productivity.

As of March 2022, it reportedly has over 2500 B2B customers in 80+ countries, and has more than 600 employees across Australia, Canada, India, the United Kingdom, and the United States.

Three months after an agreement between the parties was reported, Replicon completed its purchase in August 2023 to Deltek.

== Products ==
Replicon's product suite focuses on time intelligence.

Their suite of products include:

- Project Time Tracking
- Time & Resource Management
- Global Time & Attendance
- Project Expense Tracking
- Polaris – Professional Services Automation
- Polaris – Project Portfolio Management

Replicon has partnered and integrated with a number of HR, accounting, and payroll software. It also features an open API — allowing developers to integrate Replicon with their existing applications and software.

== Selected awards and recognition ==
- Replicon ranked in Top 250 Canadian Tech Companies for 2008
- Replicon ranked as one of the fastest growing Canadian tech companies in 2004 and 2005 in Deloitte Technology Fast 50
- Replicon ranked in Software Magazine's Annual 500 Ranking in 2004, 2005, 2006 and 2007

== See also ==
- Comparison of time tracking software
- Project management software
- Time tracking software
