= FreeAgent =

British cloud-based accounting software company

FreeAgent Holdings Ltd.
- FreeAgent logo used from 2023
- Type: Subsidiary
- Industry: Software as a Service (SaaS)
- Founded: 2007; 19 years ago
- Founders: Ed Molyneux, Olly Headey, Roan Lavery
- Headquarters: Edinburgh, Scotland, UK
- Key people: Roan Lavery (CEO)
- Parent: NatWest Group
- Website: www.freeagent.com

FreeAgent is a British company that develops cloud-based accounting software for small businesses, sole traders and accountants. Based in Edinburgh, Scotland, it was founded in 2007. The software provides tools for bookkeeping, invoicing, expenses, payroll and tax filing.

FreeAgent was listed on the Alternative Investment Market in 2016 and acquired by the Royal Bank of Scotland Group (now NatWest Group) for £53 million in 2018. It had around 225,000 customers in 2025.

== History ==
FreeAgent was founded in Edinburgh in 2007 by Ed Molyneux, Olly Headey and Roan Lavery. In 2012, it acquired the American financial software startup 60mo as part of an expansion into the United States. In 2013, FreeAgent ranked eighth in the Deloitte UK Technology Fast 50, with five-year revenue growth of 2,128%.

In 2015, FreeAgent raised £1.2 million through the crowdfunding platform Seedrs. The following year, it listed on the Alternative Investment Market (AIM), raising £10.7 million and valuing the company at £34.1 million.

Royal Bank of Scotland began offering FreeAgent to its business banking customers in 2017 and acquired the company for approximately £53 million in 2018.

In 2021, co-founder Roan Lavery succeeded Molyneux as chief executive. FreeAgent remained part of NatWest Group and became increasingly integrated with its business banking services. It had approximately 225,000 customers in 2025, up from 200,000 a year earlier.

In July 2021, co-founder Roan Lavery succeeded Ed Molyneux as chief executive. FreeAgent subsequently became increasingly integrated with NatWest Group's business banking services, including NatWest's digital bank Mettle. It had approximately 225,000 customers in 2025, up from 200,000 a year earlier.

== Software and services ==
FreeAgent provides cloud-based accounting software for small businesses, sole traders, landlords and accountants. It combines day-to-day bookkeeping with invoicing, expense tracking, bank feeds, payroll and financial reporting, and can be used to submit tax information to HM Revenue and Customs.

The software also supports the UK's Making Tax Digital system, including digital record keeping and submissions for VAT and Income Tax.

== See also ==
- Comparison of accounting software
