= Lighter Capital =

- Industry: Revenue-based financing
- Founded: 2010
- Headquarters: Seattle
- Number of employees: 20
- Website: lightercapital.com

Lighter Capital is a revenue-based financing lender that specializes in providing financial capital to small technology companies.

Founded by Andy Sack, a Seattle-area entrepreneur, Lighter Capital was one of the first lenders to use revenue-based financing to fund tech startups. Lighter Capital typically provides growth capital as royalty-based financing to early-stage tech companies based in the United States. It is headquartered in Seattle, Washington.

Unlike private equity, venture capital and angel investors, Lighter Capital's revenue-based financing process provides growth capital to tech companies in the form of debt. The company tranches financing across an investment period and looks for general revenue growth.

In 2017, the lender partnered with Intuit to launch a $15 million fund for developers who design apps for QuickBooks.

Since 2010, Lighter Capital has backed more than 270 startup companies with more than 450 rounds of financing, totaling more than $200 million.

In June 2019 Lighter Capital announced it was offering two more forms of debt: term loans and lines of credit. In January 2020, the firm secured access to $100 million in additional capital for lending to startups. As of 2020, Lighter Capital has provided over $200 million of financing to more than 350 companies.

Lighter Capital opened operations in Canada and entered into collaboration with the National Australia Bank in 2020.

In September 2020, Melissa Widner was appointed Chief Executive Officer.
