= ProWorkflow =

Project management software

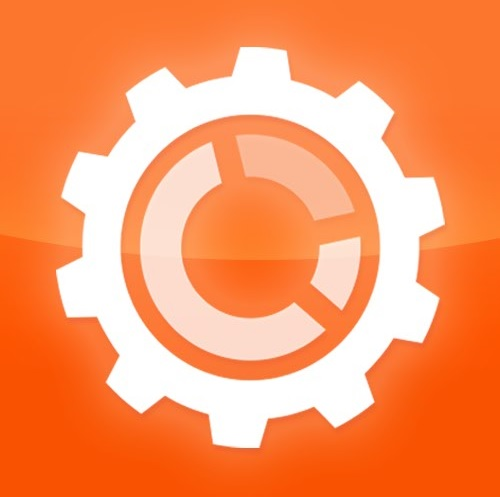
- Developer: Proactive Software
- Release: 2002
- Operating system: Web platform
- Type: Project management software
- Website: www.proworkflow.com

ProWorkflow is web-based project management application designed for managers and staff to plan, track, and collaborate to improve project delivery. ProWorkflow is now on its 8th iteration.

== History ==
ProWorkflow was founded in 2002 by CEO, Julian Stone. The idea for ProWorkflow was to assist in internal workflow but early sales of the product suggested that there was opportunity to expand to assist external companies. In 2003, ProActive Software Limited acquired ProWorkflow. Upon acquisition, it was offered as a download (and is still available as a download in some instances) – however, due to evolution of technology, the preferred method of supply is now software-as-a-service.

The idea originated from the creation of a basic PalmPilot job tracking app with time tracking ability later added. Realizing that it could also benefit other businesses, Julian worked with software developer Alan Barlow to build it as a webapp that would become ProWorkflow v1. The first release was a code download and the first sale, a $70 one-time code download fee, occurred only an hour after launch.

In 2003, John Walley joined ProActive Software as Director/Chairman to provide mentor-ship and guidance to support business growth and strategy.

According to merchantmaveric, in July 2014 ProWorkflow used to create over 1,171,315 projects by companies, most of these were creative agencies and technology companies. ProWorkflow is a project management tool that helps to manage projects and workflow internally for businesses. There are many reporting features that comes in-built in ProWorkflow and is one of the five cloud based project management tools listed by TechRepublic for wide range of projects. ProWorkflow offers month-to-month and short term contract options which is helpful for any business.

PCMag lists ProWorkflow as a strong contender against Zoho Projects and Teamwork Projects because of ProWorkflow's ability to collaborate for different size of businesses. ProWorkflow is for freelancers, start-ups and young entrepreneurs. ProWorkflow offers further apps for its software which are available in their app store and help in extending the functionality of ProWorkflow further. Companies use ProWorkflow for time tracking, invoicing and reporting purposes as a separate solution as well.

ProWorkflow's mobile app features provides the ability to manage projects easily and from anywhere.

== Versions ==
- ProWorkflow V3 launched in 2003.
- ProWorkflow V4 launched in 2004.
- ProWorkflow V8: Ground up re-build to ensure a high level of security, scalability and a platform for apps.

== Infrastructure ==
ProWorkflow is built on a ColdFusion backend that powers all the API end points but majority of its done on client side with heavy use of native JavaScript and JQuery libraries.

Infrastructure is hosted by Datapipe in Chicago, Illinois.

== See also ==
- Project management
- Project management software
- Web 2.0
