= Iwoca =

British credit financing company

Iwoca Ltd
- Type: Private company
- Industry: Financial services
- Founded: 5 October 2011; 14 years ago
- Headquarters: London, United Kingdom
- Area served: United Kingdom
- Key people: Christoph Rieche (CEO); James Dear (Co-founder)
- Products: Business loans, line of credit
- Website: iwoca.co.uk

Iwoca Ltd (/ɪˈwɒkə/; stylised iwoca) is a business finance provider operating in the UK and Germany, specialising in lending to small and medium-sized enterprises (SMEs).

The company uses a mix of automated and manual credit analysis. iwoca claims to offer a fast and simple application process, and has been recognised by users on Trustpilot for its customer service.

iwoca was founded by Christoph Rieche and James Dear in October 2011 and began trading in the UK in March 2012. In 2015, iwoca also started operating in Germany. The company has seen continued growth in both the UK and Germany, with ever-growing loan books in both countries.

Since its founding, iwoca has lent around £4 billion to 100,000 businesses.

== Products ==
=== Business Loans ===
iwoca's primary offering is a flexible, unsecured business loan which can be repaid early with no early repayment fees, also known as the Flexi-Loan. Loan terms on iwoca's small business loans range between 12 and 60 months, although they can be held for as little as one day.

In the UK, business loans of up to £1 million are available to Limited Companies and Limited Liability Partnerships. In Germany, business loans of up to €500,000 are available to all small businesses, including the self-employed.

=== iwocaPay ===
iwocaPay is an integrated trade credit and payment solution that enables suppliers to get paid instantly, while letting their trade customers access up to £30,000 and spread payments over 1, 3 or 12 months.

=== Business Credit Cards ===
In May 2026, iwoca launched its business credit card, tailored to the specific lending and spending needs of SMEs. The credit card offers up to £250,000 of credit to UK businesses with 1% cashback on all spending. Customers benefit from up to 42-days interest free and pay zero annual, FX or late payment fees with the card.

== History ==
=== Early years (2011 - 2014) ===
Founded by Christoph Rieche and James Dear in October 2011, iwoca started trading in March 2012. The company was founded to offer custom-built loans for small businesses that struggled to access finance from traditional banks.

iwoca secured a £2 million equity investment from Beyond Digital in early 2013. In January 2014, the company announced it had raised £5 million in investment led by venture capital firm Global Founders Capital for UK and European expansion.

Initially, the business focused exclusively on e-commerce businesses, but in April 2014, iwoca expanded its lending to all types of small businesses.

=== Growth (2015 - 2019) ===
iwoca entered the German market in 2015, and established itself as one of the largest Fintech small business lenders in the country. In the same year, a European Investment Fund (EIF) COSME agreement was agreed with the goal of iwoca lending £40 million to more than 3,000 UK small businesses. By July 2015, the company was reported to have seen 250% year-on-year growth in issuance when raising $20 million in equity from investors including CommerzVentures and venture capital firm Acton Capital Partners in its Series B round.

In 2018, iwoca doubled its revenues to £48 million. In the same year, iwoca also became the first small business lender to use Open Banking rules to connect large banks, in a partnership with Lloyds.

In 2019, the company raised £150 million in equity and debt capital, in a Series D funding round led by Augmentum. That year, iwoca also won £10 million from the government-backed Capability and Innovations Fund, which was part of a Banking Competition Remedies (BCR) grant. The company agreed to use these funds, along with a £13 million commitment from its own capital, to develop new products and open offices outside of London. This led to the launch of iwocaPay and the opening of an office in Leeds.

=== Covid-19 (2020 - 2021) ===
During the COVID-19 pandemic, iwoca was one of the lenders approved for the Coronavirus Business Interruption Scheme (CBILS). iwoca also took part in the Recovery Loan Scheme (RLS), although the company stopped issuing loans through the Recovery Loan Scheme in 2022.

In October 2021 the company's research found that only one‑third of small‑business owners experiencing poor mental health sought professional help. To address this, iwoca partnered with Spill to make free video therapy sessions available to all UK SME owners.

In 2021, iwoca was named the fastest-growing fintech by the Sunday Times International Track 200.

=== Post-covid growth (2022 - Present) ===
In January 2023 iwoca expanded its existing funding facility with Pollen Street Capital to £170 million. In October 2023 it secured a £200 million funding line from Barclays and Värde Partners.

In May 2024 iwoca announced £270 million in new debt funding, including £150 million from Citibank and Insight Investment for expansion in Germany and £120 million from Barclays and Värde Partners for the UK, taking cumulative investment above £1 billion since 2012.

iwoca achieved net profitability in Q4 2022 and has remained profitable since.

In 2026, iwoca made the following economic contributions through its lending, as reported in its annual SME impact report, conducted by Capital Economics:

- £4.1 billion GDP contribution to the UK and German economies.
- 62,600 jobs supported in the UK and Germany.
- £1.2 billion tax revenue generated in the UK and Germany.

== Partnerships ==
iwoca has partnerships with a range of companies in the UK and Germany, including:

- Tide (UK & Germany) - Since 2017 iwoca has partnered with Tide to offer business finance to Tide's customers in the UK without them having to leave the Tide app. Although Tide customers were initially able to borrow up to £100,000, today they can borrow up to £1 million from iwoca. Tide customers in Germany have been able to access iwoca business finance through the Tide app since 2024.
- Teya (UK) - iwoca has partnered with payments firm Teya to offer iwoca's Flexi-Loan product directly within the Teya app and web portal. Teya customers are able to apply for loans from £1,000 up to £1 million with flexible terms ranging from one day to 60 months.
- DFKP (Germany) - iwoca has partnered with business finance broker DFKP to create a joint API interface. This enables fast credit assessments for iwoca loans up to €500,000.
- Check24 (Germany) - Since 2023, iwoca has partnered with comparison platform Check24 to offer business loans up to €500,000 within the Check24 loan comparison.

== Employee experience ==
iwoca was named one of the "UK's Top 50 Fintechs to Work For in 2025" by employment platform Welcome To The Jungle, as well as holding a 4.7 rating on Glassdoor.

The benefits page on their website mentions flexible working arrangements, annual stock options and enhanced parental leave, as well as dedicated time and budget for professional development.

iwoca has staff in both the UK and Germany, with offices in London, Leeds, Berlin, and Frankfurt.

== Awards and media mentions ==
Here are some of the awards that iwoca has won to-date:

- Yorkshire financial awards 2023 - iwoca was named lender of the year.
- Moneynet awards 2024 - iwoca was named best small business lender.
- Moneynet awards 2025 - iwoca was named best small business provider.
- iwoca was featured in the CNBC top fintechs in the world in 2025.
- Fintech Awards London 2026 - iwoca was named Fintech Company of the Year.

The company has also been mentioned in major media outlets including The Times, CityAM, The Financial Times, The Telegraph and The Independent.
