= Teamwork (project management) =

Irish project management software company

Teamwork Crew Ltd.
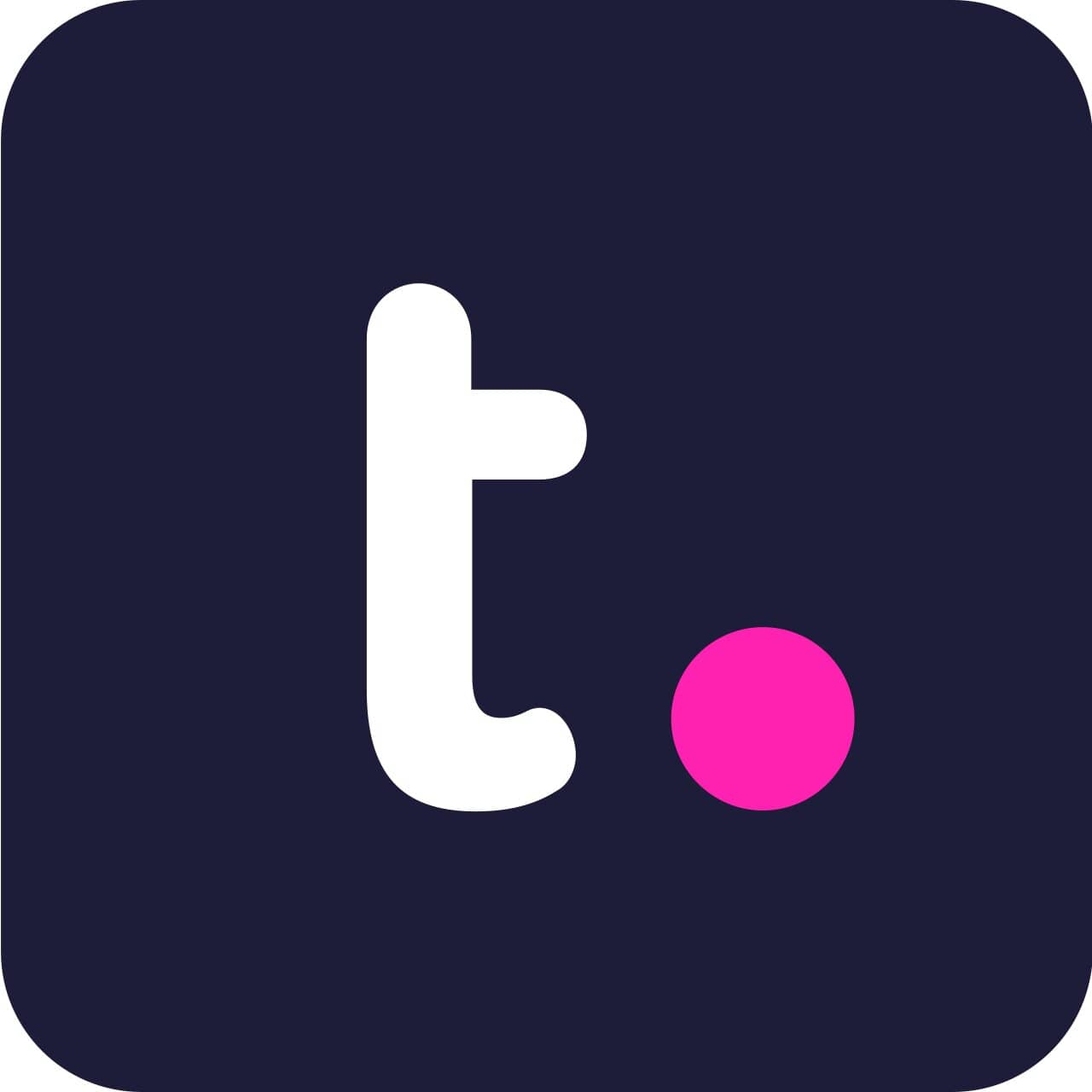
- Teamwork Logo
- Type: Privately held company
- Industry: Project management; task management; productivity software; team collaboration
- Founded: 1 January 2007; 19 years ago, in Blackpool, Cork, Ireland.
- Founder: Peter Coppinger; Daniel Mackey
- Headquarters: Teamwork Campus One Blackpool, Cork, Ireland
- Number of locations: 3
- Area served: Global
- Products: Teamwork Projects; Teamwork Desk; Teamwork Chat; Teamwork Spaces; Teamwork CRM
- Services: Web applications
- Number of employees: 270 (2021)
- Website: www.teamwork.com

Teamwork.com is an Irish, privately owned, web-based software company headquartered in Cork, Ireland. Teamwork creates task management and team collaboration software. Founded in 2007, as of 2016 the company stated that its software was in use by over 370,000 organisations worldwide (including Disney, Spotify and HP), and that it had over 2.4m users.

== History ==
Peter Coppinger and Dan Mackey founded Digital Crew in 2007 to build websites, intranets, and custom web applications for clients in Cork, Ireland. Dissatisfied with standard whiteboards and existing software management tools, Coppinger sought a project management software that was easy to use and adaptable for various industries. Originally 37signals Basecamp users themselves, Coppinger and Mackey were frustrated by the limited feature set, and by Basecamp's apparent inaction on their feedback. In October 2007, Coppinger and Mackey launched Teamwork Project Manager, nicknamed TeamworkPM. In March 2015, this was renamed as Teamwork Projects.

In 2014, after two years of negotiations, TeamworkPM bought the domain name 'Teamwork.com' for US$675,000 (€500,000). At the time this was one of the most expensive domain name purchases by an Irish company, and involved the transfer of a domain name which had been dormant since it was first acquired by the original owner in 1999.

In 2015, Teamwork.com was named by Gartner to be one of their "Cool Vendors" in the Program and Portfolio Management Category. This was followed by the launch of a new real-time messaging product, Teamwork Chat, in January 2015. In June 2015, the company announced a drive to recruit for 40 positions by the end of the year. This was followed by the announcement that the company was investing more than €1 million in a new office, and had leased office space in Park House, Blackpool.

In June 2016, Teamwork.com undertook a further recruitment drive to entice developers to Cork.

In July 2021, the company announced that it had raised an investment of $70 million (€59.1 million) from venture capital firm Bregal Milestone to fund further growth.

== Products ==
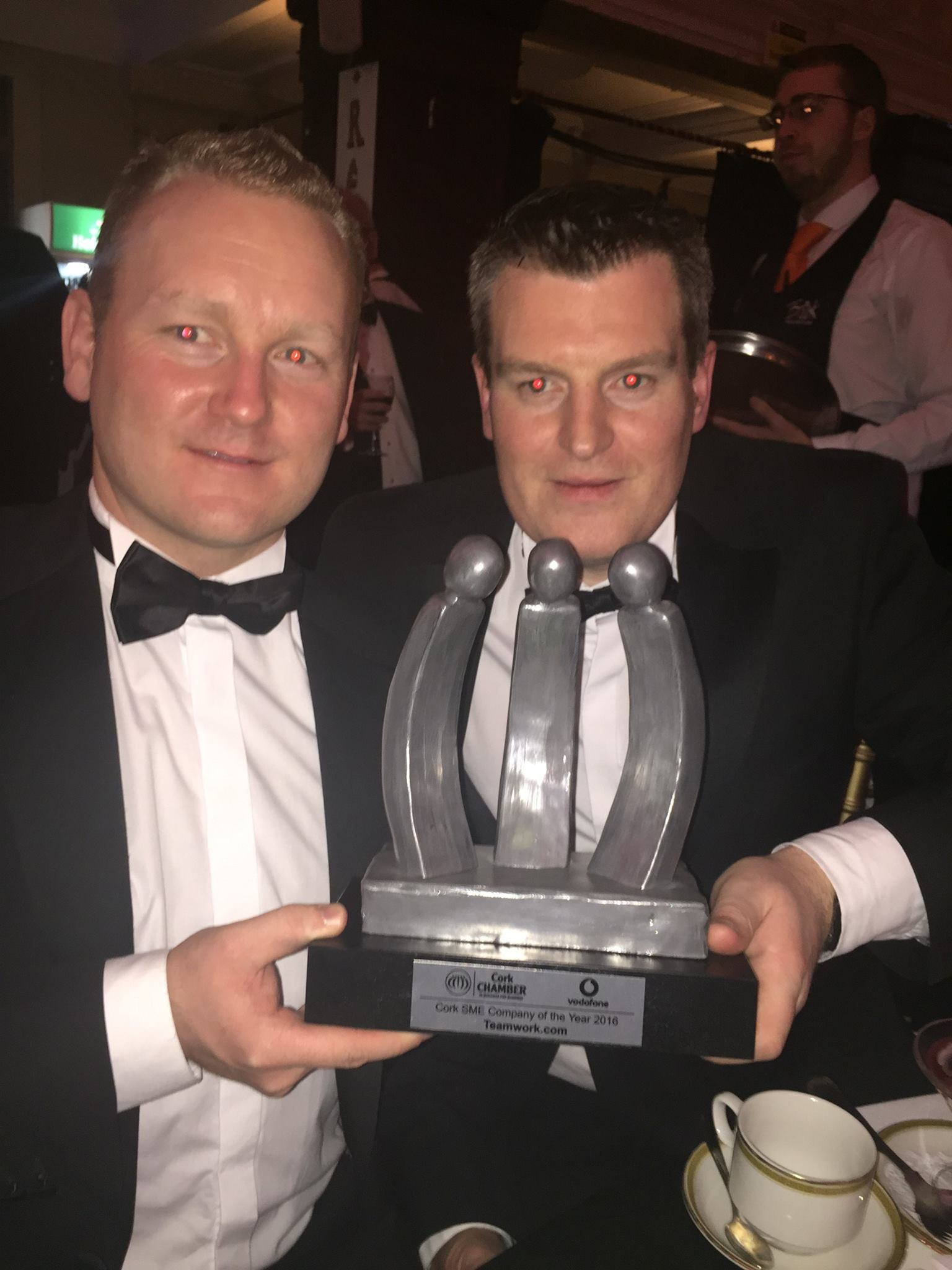
Co-founders, Peter Coppinger and Daniel Mackey, pictured with Cork Company of the Year Award 2016 for best SME

Teamwork markets a number of cloud-based applications, including Teamwork, Teamwork Desk, Teamwork Spaces, Teamwork CRM and Teamwork Chat. Teamwork was launched on 4 October 2007, at which time it had time management, milestone management, file sharing, time tracking, and messaging features.

Teamwork's platform reportedly integrates with martech software like HubSpot, as well as other productivity tools like Slack, G Suite, MS Teams, Zapier, Dropbox and QuickBooks.

== Awards ==
- In 2016, Teamwork was awarded Cork's Best SME in the Cork Chamber of Commerce "Company of the Year" awards.
- In 2016, Teamwork was named number 7 in Deloitte's Fast 50 tech companies hit €1.6bn turnover.
- In 2015, Teamwork was identified as a Gartner "Cool Vendor" in the Program and Portfolio Management Category.

== See also ==
- List of collaborative software
- List of project management software
