= Joanna Shields =

Joanna Shields may refer to:

- Joanna Shields, Baroness Shields, American–British businesswoman and politician
- Joanna Berry Shields, co-founder of Alpha Kappa Alpha sorority
