= FreshBooks =

Cloud-based accounting software service

- Developer: 2ndSite Inc
- Release: 2004; 22 years ago
- Available in: 12 languages
- List of languages English, French, Danish, Estonian, German, Italian, Norwegian, Portuguese, Spanish, Spanish (Latin American), Swedish
- Type: Accounting software, SaaS
- License: Proprietary
- Website: www.freshbooks.com

FreshBooks is accounting software operated by 2ndSite Inc. primarily for small and medium-sized businesses. It is a web-based software as a service (SaaS) model, that can be accessed through a desktop or mobile device.

The company was founded in 2003 and is based in Toronto, Canada.

== History ==
FreshBooks was founded in 2004 by Mike McDerment, Levi Cooperman, and Joe Sawada in Toronto, Ontario. McDerment incorporated a second company, BillSpring in January 2015 to work on new product development. It was rolled back into FreshBooks as an updated interface in 2016.

Initially FreshBooks functioned like an electronic invoicing program targeting IT professionals. After the release of the new interface, the initial release of FreshBooks was referred to as "FreshBooks Classic." FreshBooks Classic was discontinued in 2022 after migrating users to the new platform. FreshBooks Classic's front-end application was built in PHP, and the backend services were built in Python while the new FreshBooks uses the same backend services with a JavaScript single-page application.

== Product ==
FreshBooks is a subscription-based accounting software platform that provides features such as invoicing, accounts payable, expense and time tracking, retainers, fixed asset depreciation, purchase orders, payroll integrations, mileage tracking, double-entry accounting, and standard business reporting. Financial data is stored in the cloud on a unified ledger, enabling access from desktop and mobile devices. The platform includes a free API for integration with external applications and supports multiple tax rates and currencies. It also offers project management and payroll functionalities. Pricing is based on a recurring monthly fee.

FreshBooks supports country-specific tax calculations, including GST and HST in Canada, sales taxes in the United States, and MTD compliance in the UK.

== Operations ==
FreshBooks has its headquarters in Toronto, Canada with operations in North America, Europe and Australia. Founder Mike McDerment was the chief executive officer of the company from 2003 until 2021, when he stepped down and was replaced by Don Epperson, but stayed as the executive chair. Don Epperson had previously joined FreshBooks as executive director in 2019.

== Funding ==
FreshBooks was initially self-funded. In 2014, the company raised a Series A venture investment of $30 million led by the venture capital firm Oak Investment Partners, with participation by Georgian Partners and Atlas Venture. In 2017, FreshBooks announced that it raised another $43 million in funding from Accomplice, Georgian Partners and Oak Investment Partners.

On August 10, 2021, FreshBooks announced that it had secured $80.75 million in Series E funding and $50 million in debt financing. FreshBooks also reached a valuation of more than $1 billion.

== See also ==
- Comparison of accounting software
- Comparison of time-tracking software
