= Instant (app) =

Mobile app

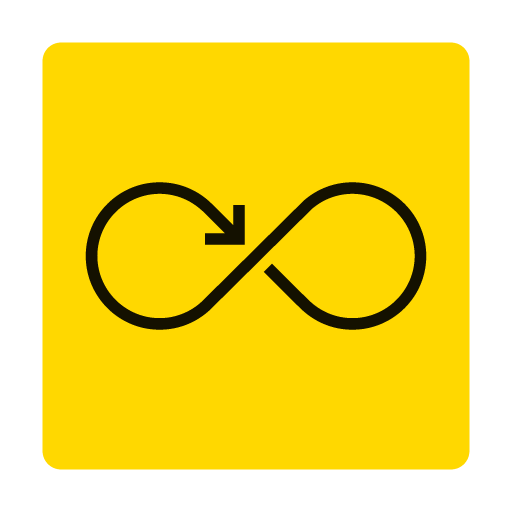
- Developer: Emberify
- Release: 2015
- Stable release: 3.4
- Operating system: Android, iOS
- Available in: English, Japanese
- Type: Lifestyle
- License: Proprietary
- Website: instantapp.today

Instant is a Quantified Self mobile app for iOS and Android. It tracks the user's phone/app usage, travel, places, fitness and sleep automatically. It puts all this information on a dashboard and gives the user analysed reports based on the data. It is developed by Emberify, founded by Shashwat Pradhan. Instant 4.0 was launched on 13 July 2016 with a Chatbot Coach. The Coach allows users to query data and it also passively analyses the user's trends and correlations.

== Features ==
Instant automatically tracks phone/app usage, fitness, travel, sleep and places. It provides daily and weekly reports based on the user's tracked data. All the data stays only on the user's smartphone. It is meant to track habits, especially used by Quantified Self and lifelogging enthusiasts.

Instant is a passive journaling app, that automatically journals the user's life with data from the smartphone and sensors. For health and fitness data it can also sync with Google Fit and Apple Health.

Instant also can connect to the user's Apple Watch and Android Wear smartwatch.

== Trackable activities ==
As of May 2016, Instant tracks the following activities:

- Phone usage time
- App usage time (Android only)
- Sleeping
- Time spent at places
- Fitness
- Travel time

== Awards ==
Instant won the Grand Prize of the Google Fit Developer Challenge in April 2015. It also won the Best App Ever Awards 2015 in the Productivity Category.

== See also ==
- Comparison of time-tracking software
