= Making Tax Digital =

Government initiative in the UK

Making Tax Digital (MTD) is a programme of the UK government to digitise tax administration by HM Revenue and Customs (HMRC). Announced in 2015, it was originally intended to be implemented by 2020.

MTD first became mandatory for VAT in April 2019 and was extended to all VAT-registered businesses in April 2022. Making Tax Digital for Income Tax began on 6 April 2026 for sole traders and landlords with qualifying income above £50,000. The threshold is due to fall to £30,000 in 2027 and £20,000 in 2028.

Taxpayers within scope must keep specified records digitally and use compatible software to send information to HMRC. For MTD for Income Tax, this includes quarterly updates and an annual tax return.

== History and implementation ==
Making Tax Digital was announced in 2015, with the rollout originally planned to cover most businesses by 2020. In 2017, the government scaled back the programme, making VAT the first tax subject to the new system and postponing its introduction for other taxes. Plans to introduce MTD for Corporation Tax were abandoned in 2025.

The system became mandatory for VAT in April 2019 for businesses above the VAT registration threshold, and was extended to all VAT-registered businesses in April 2022. Its introduction for Income Tax was delayed several times, from an original start date of 2018 to 2020, 2023, 2024 and finally 2026.

The first mandatory phase of Making Tax Digital for Income Tax began on 6 April 2026, covering sole traders and landlords with qualifying income above £50,000. Further phases are scheduled to extend the requirement to those with qualifying income above £30,000 from April 2027 and above £20,000 from April 2028.

== Exemptions ==
Taxpayers may be exempt from Making Tax Digital if HMRC considers it unreasonable or impractical for them to use digital tools. This can include reasons such as age, disability or health or lack of internet access, or religious beliefs that are incompatible with electronic communication.

For Income Tax, some taxpayers are exempt automatically, including certain trusts, personal representatives and people without a National Insurance number. Others can apply for an exemption if they are digitally excluded. Those exempt from MTD for Income Tax continue to file a Self Assessment tax return through the existing system.

== Software ==
As HMRC does not provide software for Making Tax Digital for Income Tax, taxpayers must use compatible third-party software to keep digital records, submit quarterly updates and file their annual tax return.

More than 60 compatible products were listed by HMRC in early 2026, including paid and free options. Examples of compatible software include Xero, Sage, QuickBooks, FreeAgent and Zoho Books.

MTD functionality has also been incorporated into business banking. As of 2026, providers including Starling Bank, Monzo, Tide, NatWest and HSBC offer MTD features with business accounts.

The requirement to use third-party software has attracted criticism, with the Low Incomes Tax Reform Group arguing that it could make tax filing more burdensome for taxpayers without professional help. At the same time, over 20 free products and additional low-cost software were available in 2026.
