= Zapier =

Software company

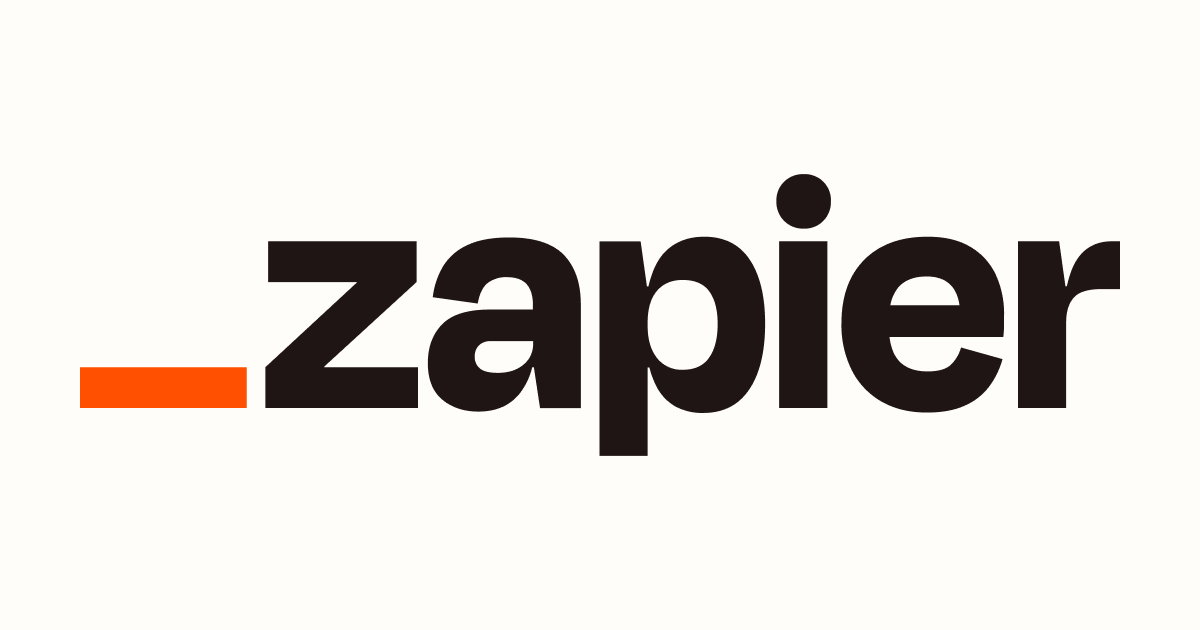
- Type: Private
- Industry: Software as a service (SaaS)
- Founded: 2011 (project) and 2012 (company launch)
- Founders: Wade Foster, Bryan Helmig, Mike Knoop
- Headquarters: San Francisco, California, US
- Number of locations: Distributed; fully remote company
- Area served: Worldwide
- Number of employees: ~730 (2025)
- Website: zapier.com

Zapier (/ˈzæpiər/ ZAP-ee-ər) is an American software company that provides a platform for business process automation and application integration. The platform connects web-based applications to automate data transfers and other tasks, including workflows that use artificial intelligence (AI). Founded in 2011, the company launched its platform in 2012 through the Y Combinator startup accelerator program. Zapier operates as a low-code and no-code platform, allowing users to create automated workflows with limited programming knowledge. As of 2026, Zapier supported integrations with more than 9,000 web applications and over 66,000 automated triggers and actions.

== History ==
Zapier began as a side project in 2011 in Columbia, Missouri, United States, founded by Wade Foster, Bryan Helmig, and Mike Knoop, who attended the University of Missouri. Foster and Knoop were doing freelance work building small integrations for companies when they noticed they were frequently using the same connectors. In September 2011, Foster and Helmig, then colleagues at Veterans United Home Loans, began developing a tool to integrate multiple software applications with Knoop joining later that year. For several months, the team worked on the software while maintaining full-time jobs. The founders applied to Y Combinator, a Silicon Valley startup incubator, but were initially rejected. They reapplied the following year and were accepted.

In December 2011, Foster left his job to work on Zapier full-time. Helmig followed in April 2012, and Knoop joined full-time in May, the same month the company launched its public beta. The founders relocated to Mountain View, California, to launch Zapier and formally join the Y Combinator program in June. Zapier is headquartered in San Francisco, California, but does not have work offices and has operated fully remotely since its founding.

Since its founding, Zapier has grown with minimal outside fundraising, a practice that is uncommon among software companies. In October 2012, Zapier received a $1.2 million seed round led by Bessemer Venture Partners (BVP), Draper Fisher Jurvetson (DFJ), and several angel investors.

Zapier became profitable in 2014. In March 2017, Zapier introduced a $10,000 "de-location" package program for workers who chose to move out of the San Francisco Bay Area, due to the region's high cost of living and housing shortage, The program was limited to individuals intending to move away from the Bay Area and required a commitment of at least one year of employment at the company. Zapier received about 150 applicants over the weekend, including 50 who specifically cited the de-location package in their application.

In December 2018, Zapier announced that it had reached its 200th employee.

In January 2021, investment firms Sequoia Capital and Steadfast Financial purchased shares from some of Zapier's early investors in a secondary market transaction. The terms of the deal, including the amount sold and the participating investors, were not publicly disclosed. The transaction valued the company at US$5 billion. Foster stated none of the founders took part in the sale. As of August 2022, the company employed approximately 700 people in close to forty countries.

== Acquisitions ==
In March 2021, Zapier acquired its first company, Makerpad, a no-code education service, for an undisclosed sum of money.

In March 2024, Zapier acquired Vowel, an AI video conferencing tool. Vowel's founder, Andrew Berman, joined Zapier following the acquisition. In July 2024, Zapier acquired NoCodeOps, an Atlanta-based no-code platform.

In October 2025, Zapier acquired Utopian Labs (originally known as Luna.ai), a company which used chatbots to write sales emails. Utopian Labs ceased operations the following month.

== Products and services ==
Zapier is a low-code/no-code enterprise software platform. It is intended for users with minimal to moderate technical skills to assist in workflow creation.

The company's automation system is built around workflows called "zaps", which consist of a "trigger", an event in one application, and one or more "actions" carried out in other connected apps in response. Users can create workflows using a library of templates or build custom ones. These workflows can include multiple steps, perform actions across various applications, and support automations and data transfers. Workflows can also be created using Zapier Copilot, a large language models (LLMs) tool for building and troubleshooting workflows via natural language prompts.

The platform has a directory of connectors to exchange data through application programming interfaces (APIs). For integrations not available in the directory, users can create custom connectors using the Zapier Developer Platform. Zapier also has a no-code database called Zapier Tables, which allows users to work with data before integrating it across applications. Another product, Zapier Interfaces, is used to create custom web interfaces, forms, and applications that can connect to and trigger automated workflows. Zapier Canvas, launched in 2023, is a diagramming and visualization tool used to plan and document workflows. Beyond traditional workflows, Zapier expanded its product line to include "Zapier Tables," a secure, no-code database natively designed to store, manage, and track data specifically for automation pipelines. Additionally, it introduced "Zapier Interfaces," which enables users to build custom front-end applications, user portals, and web forms directly connected to their internal automated workflows.

=== AI Orchestration and MCP ===
In 2026, Zapier shifted toward AI orchestration by launching an official integration for the Model Context Protocol (MCP). This protocol serves as an open-standard gateway, allowing external large language models (LLMs) and AI client applications—such as Anthropic's Claude and OpenAI's ChatGPT—to natively execute actions and manage tasks across Zapier's catalog of over 9,000 supported applications using natural language commands.
