= QuickBooks =

Accounting software for small and medium-sized businesses developed by Intuit

- Developer: Intuit Inc.
- Release: 1992; 34 years ago
- Stable release: 2024
- Operating system: Microsoft Windows macOS (USA only)
- Type: Accounting software
- License: Proprietary
- Website: quickbooks.intuit.com

QuickBooks is an accounting software package developed and marketed by Intuit. First introduced in 1992, QuickBooks is primarily aimed at small and medium-sized businesses. The software offers both on-premises accounting applications and cloud-based versions, which enable users to accept business payments, manage and pay bills, and handle payroll functions.

== History ==
Intuit was founded in 1983 by Scott Cook and Tom Proulx in Mountain View, California, USA. After the success of its Quicken product for individual financial management, the company developed similar services for small business owners.

=== Initial release ===
The initial Quicken software did not function as a double-entry accounting package. The initial release of QuickBooks was the DOS version that was based on the Quicken codebase. The Windows and Mac versions shared a different codebase that was based on In-House Accountant, which Intuit had acquired. The software was popular among small business owners who had no formal accounting training. As such, the software soon claimed up to 85 percent of the US small business accounting software market. It continued to command the vast majority of this market as of 2013. Professional accountants, however, were not satisfied with early versions of the system, citing poor security controls, such as no audit trail, as well as non-conformity with traditional accounting standards.

=== Subsequent releases ===
Intuit expanded QuickBooks during the early 2000s to serve a wider range of businesses and accounting professionals. By 2002, the product line included Basic, Pro, Premier and Accountant editions, while QuickBooks Enterprise targeted larger and more complex businesses. Intuit also began introducing industry-specific editions with specialised reports and workflows for sectors such as contracting, retail, manufacturing and professional services.

QuickBooks became a leading small-business accounting product in the United States. In 2005, BusinessWeek estimated that it had about 74% of the US retail market for small-business accounting software.

During the late 2010s and early 2020s, Intuit continued annual releases of QuickBooks Desktop, adding greater automation, improved bank feeds and reporting, inventory and payment tools, and receipt management. Alongside its Desktop products, the company expanded QuickBooks Online. By 2021, QuickBooks Online Accounting generated $1.7 billion in revenue, compared with $789 million from QuickBooks Desktop Accounting.

== International versions ==
Versions of this product are available in many different markets. Intuit's Canadian, British, Australian divisions offer versions of QuickBooks that support the unique tax calculation needs of each region, such as Canada's GST, HST or PST sales tax, VAT for the United Kingdom edition and Australia's GST sales tax. The QuickBooks UK edition also includes support for Irish and South African VAT. QuickBooks Enterprise was withdrawn from the UKI market in 2014.

QuickBooks Desktop is only available on a rental/subscription basis for users in UK and Ireland, and is to be withdrawn from sale with no desktop software replacement with the final version being the 2021 edition.

The Mac (macOS) version is available only in the United States.

QuickBooks announced that their products and service offerings for accountancy and small business customers will no longer be available in India after 31 January 2023.

=== United Kingdom ===
A UK-specific version of QuickBooks Online was introduced in 2011, with support for British accounting and tax requirements. Intuit ended support for QuickBooks Desktop in the United Kingdom and Ireland on 30 June 2023 as it shifted its focus towards cloud-based products.

QuickBooks supports Making Tax Digital for VAT and Income Tax. From April 2026, qualifying sole traders and landlords can use QuickBooks to keep digital records and submit Income Tax updates to HM Revenue and Customs.

== Features ==
Intuit has integrated several web-based features into QuickBooks, including remote access capabilities, remote payroll assistance and outsourcing, electronic payment functions, online banking and reconciliation, mapping features through integration with Google Maps, marketing options through Google, and improved e-mail functionality through Microsoft Outlook and Outlook Express. For the 2008 version, the company has also added import from Excel spreadsheets, additional employee time tracking options, pre-authorization of electronic funds and new Help functions. In June 2007, Intuit announced that QuickBooks Enterprise Solutions would run on Linux servers, whereas previously it required a Windows server to run.

=== QuickBooks Online ===
QuickBooks Online is Intuit's cloud-based accounting service, offered separately from the company's desktop products. It is sold by subscription and provides bookkeeping, invoicing, expense tracking, bank reconciliation and financial reporting, with integrations for payments, payroll and third-party business applications.

In 2013, Intuit redesigned QuickBooks Online as a cloud platform intended to support third-party applications and international expansion. The following year marked a shift in the QuickBooks business, when more new customers chose QuickBooks Online than QuickBooks Desktop for the first time. Intuit reported 683,000 QuickBooks Online customers at the end of fiscal 2014.

QuickBooks Online subsequently became the larger of Intuit's online and desktop accounting products by revenue. In the first nine months of fiscal 2026, QuickBooks Online Accounting generated $3.73 billion in revenue, compared with $1.27 billion from QuickBooks Desktop Accounting. For the full fiscal year, QuickBooks Online Accounting revenue increased by 23%.

=== Artificial intelligence ===
Generative AI was introduced to QuickBooks with Intuit Assist in 2023, providing personalised financial advice and recommendations. The service was expanded in 2024 to automate tasks such as invoicing and other financial workflows.

In 2025, AI agents were added for accounting, payments, financial analysis and customer management. They can perform tasks such as transaction categorisation, reconciliation and invoice management.

These capabilities were expanded in 2026 through Intuit Intelligence, which uses QuickBooks business data to answer financial questions and automate multi-step workflows. Intuit has described the broader strategy as moving from conventional financial software towards a "system of intelligence", while retaining human review for higher-stakes decisions.

=== QuickBooks Point of Sale ===
QuickBooks Point of Sale is software that replaces a retailer's cash register, tracks its inventory, sales, and customer information, and provides reports for managing its business and serving its customers. In early 2023, Intuit announced they would be discontinuing their Point of Sale software on October 3, 2023, including technical support and support of credit card Merchant Services, stating "the platform on which the software is built is unique, requires complex maintenance, and makes introducing new features very difficult". While the software would continue to function for end users after that date, Intuit will no longer provide software updates for security and functionality.

== Add-on programs ==
Through the Solutions Marketplace, Intuit encouraged third-party software developers to create programs that fill niche areas for specific industries and integrate with QuickBooks. Intuit partnered with Lighter Capital to create a $15 million fund for developers designing apps for Intuit QuickBooks. The Intuit Developer Network provides marketing and technical resources, including software development kits (SDKs).

Intuit's Lacerte and ProConnect Tax Online tax preparation software for professional accountants who prepare tax returns for a living integrates with QuickBooks in this way. Microsoft Office also integrates with QuickBooks.

== See also ==
- Comparison of accounting software
