= Timesheet =

Record of the amount of time a person has spent on a particular job

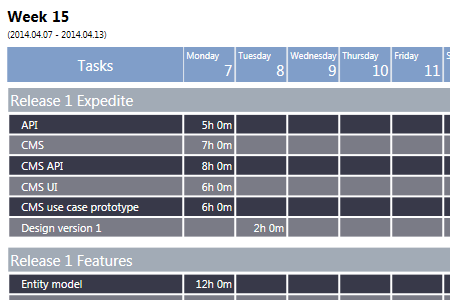
Contemporary time sheet

A timesheet (or time sheet) is a method for recording the amount of a worker's time spent on each job. Traditionally a sheet of paper with the data arranged in tabular format, a timesheet is now often a digital document or spreadsheet. The time cards stamped by time clocks can serve as a timesheet or provide the data to fill one. These, too, are now often digital. Timesheets came into use in the 19th century as time books. To record time in a more granular fashion, time-tracking software may be used.

== Use ==
Originally developed for an employer to calculate payroll, a timesheet can also be used for management accounting. Timesheets may track the start and end times of tasks or just the duration. It may contain a detailed breakdown of tasks accomplished throughout the project or program. This information may be used for payroll, client billing, and increasingly for project costing, estimation, tracking, and management.

Some companies provide web-based timesheet software or services that provide a means to track time for payroll, billing and project management. One of the major uses of timesheet in a project management environment is comparing planned costs versus actual costs, as well as measuring employee performance and identifying problematic tasks. This knowledge can drive corporate strategy as users stop performing or reassign unprofitable work.

== Time cards ==
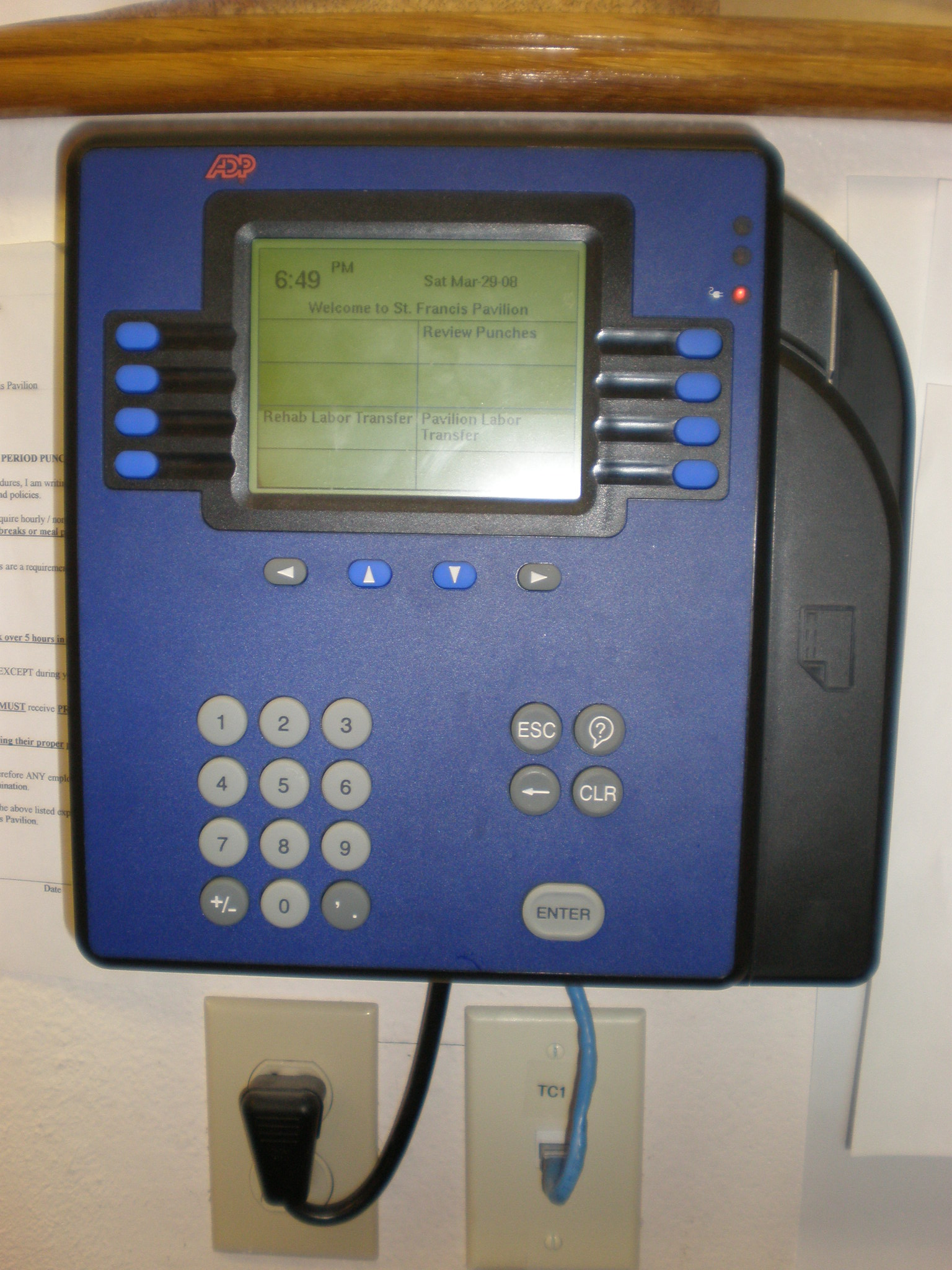
An ADP Model 4500 timecard reader

Factory workers may often have a "time card" (also known as punch card) and "punch in" by inserting their card into an automatic timestamp machine (called a time clock or bundy clock) when starting and ending their work shift, though other card technologies such as swipe cards have become more prevalent.

== Advantages ==
Time tracking can reduce costs in three ways: by making payroll processing more efficient, by making costs visible so they can be reduced, and by automating billing and invoicing.

Time tracking can increase revenue through automating billing, which tends to make it easier for a company to get correct invoices out for all hours worked by consulting staff. This speeds up payment and eliminates the hassles of 'dropping' bills.

By reducing costs in three ways, and increasing revenue in one way, timesheet management technologies that are web-based can improve the health of companies.

In project management, timesheet can also be used to build a body of knowledge about how much effort tasks take to develop. This data helps resource managers to allocate resource accurately. Machine learning is being used to automatically find patterns in timesheet — then using this information to recommend more accurate project plans in the future. For example, if developing a training plan has historically taken a month, then it can be assumed that creating a new one will take a month. Also, most timesheet software has the ability to track resource costs and project expenses to allow for better future budgeting.

For the HR function, the time spent on activities by individuals can be analysed over a period of time and categorised into broad types. Based on the outcome, roles could be realigned.

== See also ==
- Comparison of time tracking software
- Schedule (workplace)
- Time clock
- Logbook
- Time-tracking software
- Time and attendance
- Time management
- Work breakdown structure
