= Time-tracking software =

Computer programs used to record time spent on tasks

Time-tracking software are computer programs that allows users to record time spent on tasks or projects. Time-tracking software may include time-recording software, which uses user activity monitoring to record the activities performed on a computer and the time spent on each project and task.

== Timesheet software ==
Timesheet software is software used to maintain timesheets. It was popularized when computers were first introduced to the office environment, with the goal of automating heavy paperwork for big organizations.

== See also ==
- Comparison of time-tracking software
- Computer surveillance
- Employee-scheduling software
- Meeting scheduling tool
- Project-management software
- Schedule (workplace)
- Time and attendance
- Time management
