= Belo Horizonte =

Capital city of Minas Gerais, Brazil

- Municipality
- Municipality of Belo Horizonte
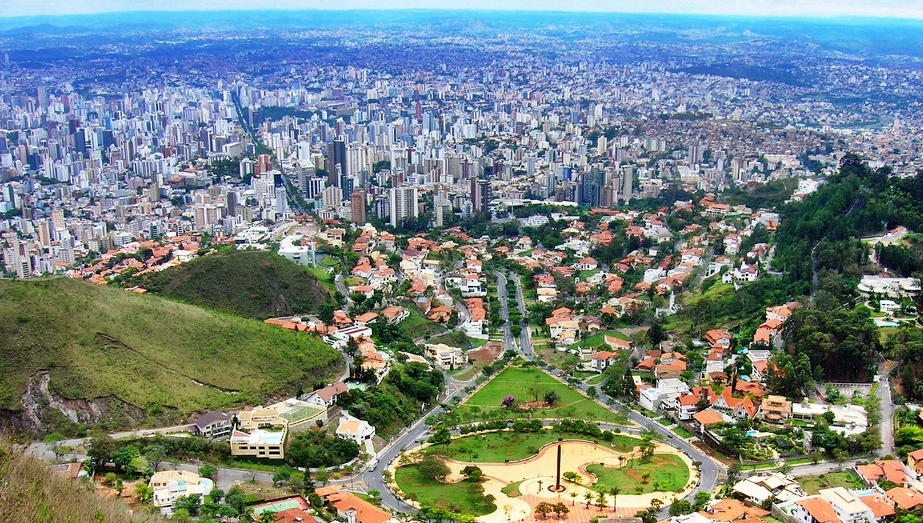
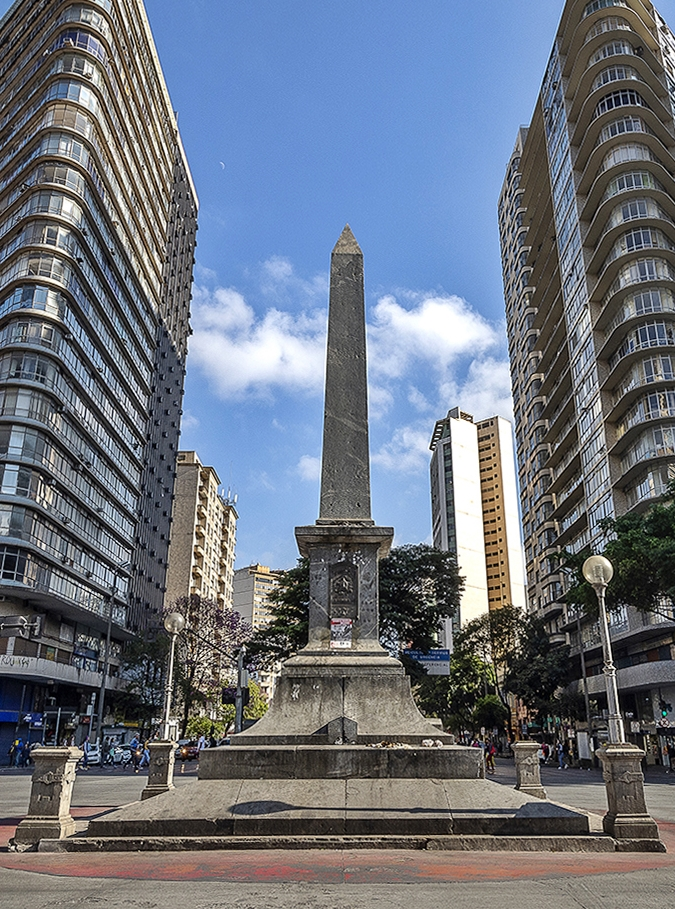
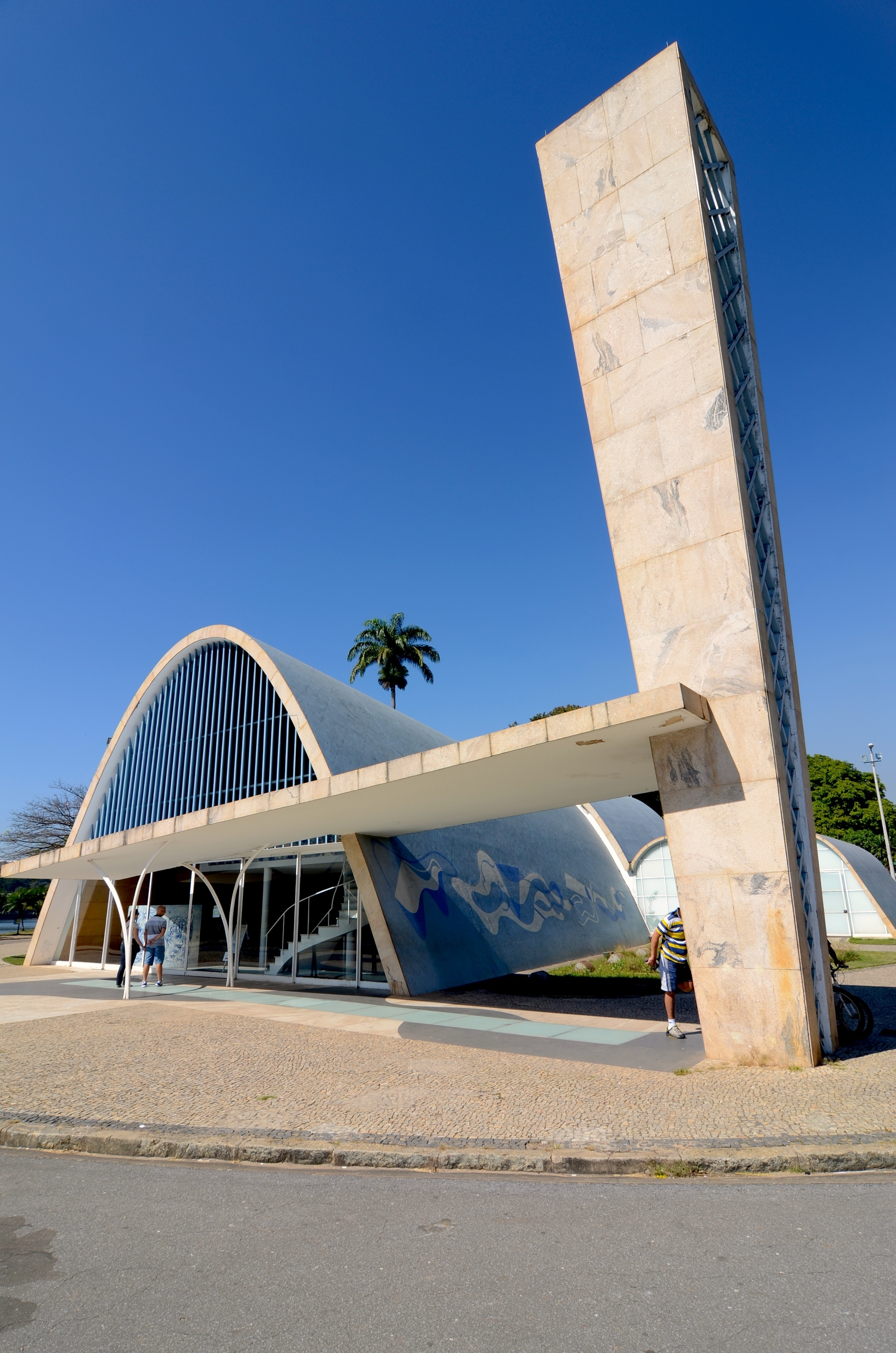
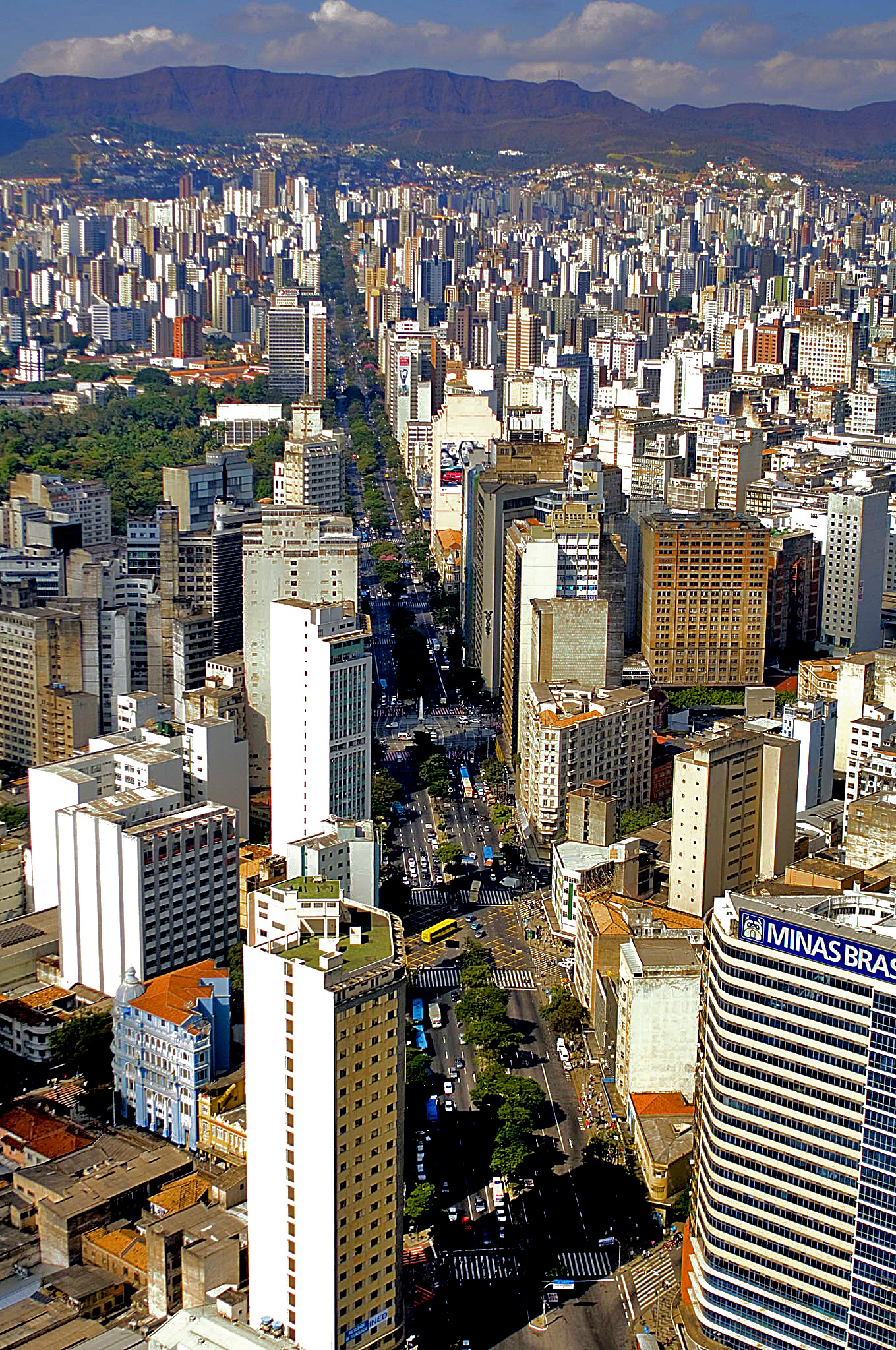
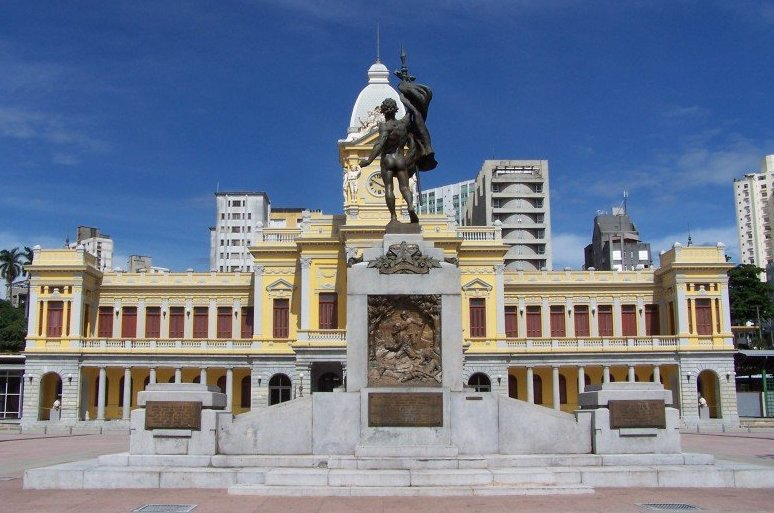
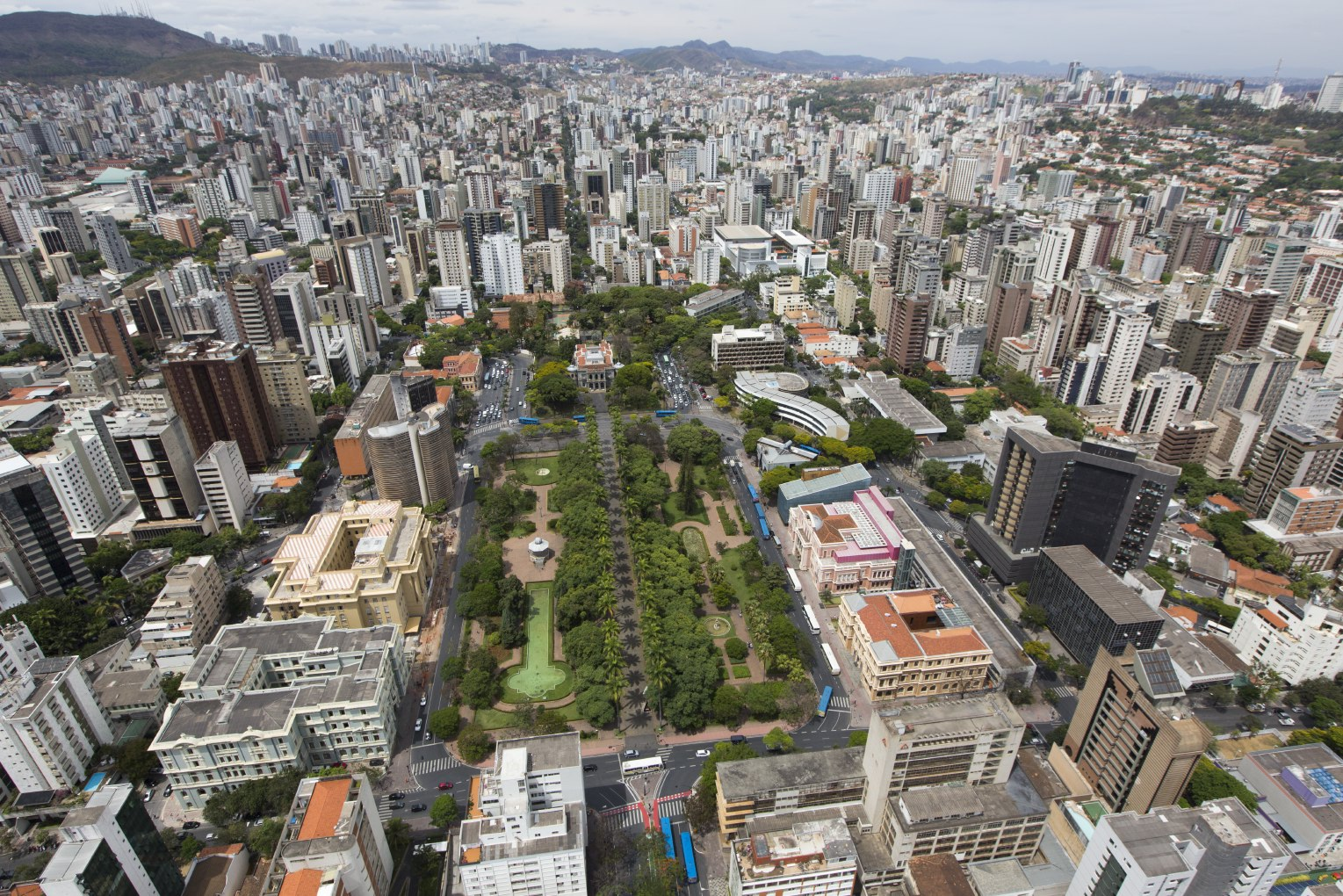
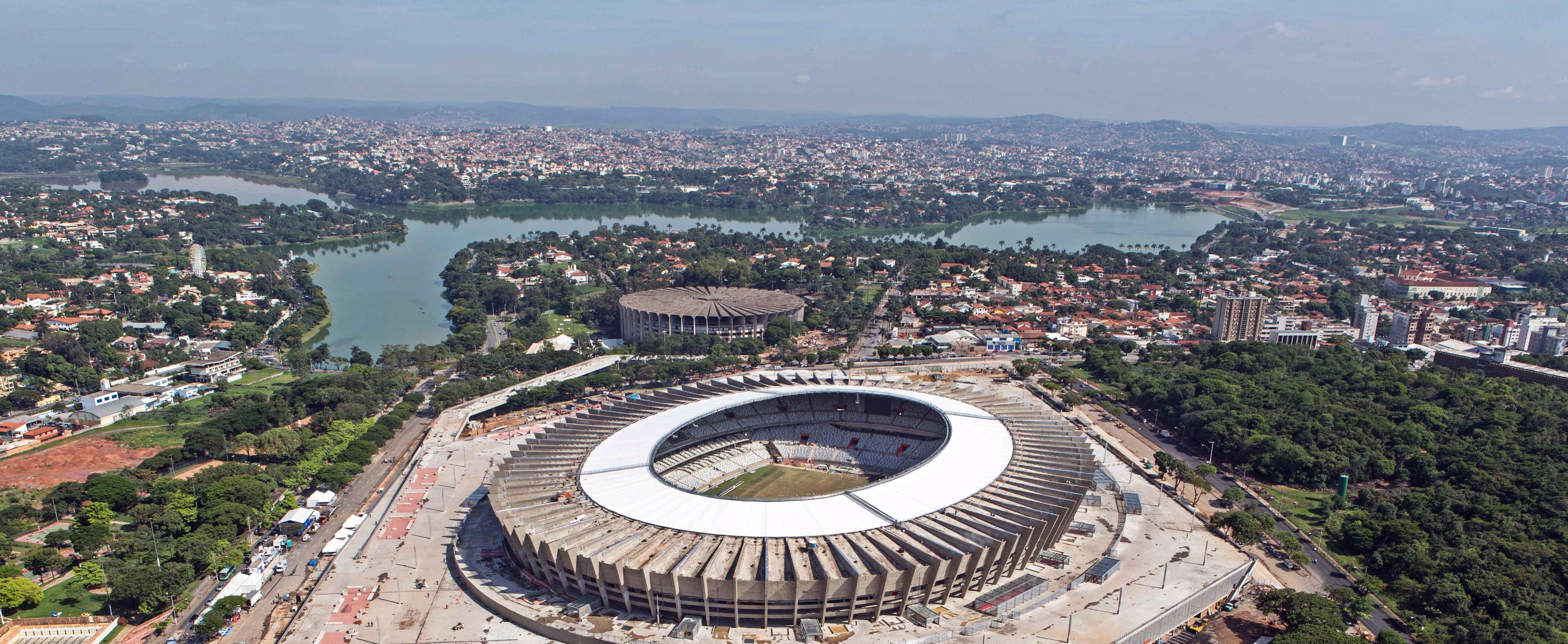
- Skyline from Praça Israel Pinheiro Praça Sete de Setembro Pampulha Church Afonso Pena Avenue Praça Rui Barbosa Praça da Liberdade Mineirão Stadium and Lake Pampulha

- Flag Coat of arms
- Nicknames: BH (pronounced [ˌbeaˈɡa]); The Garden City; Belô
- Location in Minas Gerais

- Location within Brazil Location within South America
- Coordinates: 19°55′S 43°56′W
- Country: Brazil
- State: Minas Gerais
- Region: Southeast
- Intermediate Region: Belo Horizonte
- Immediate Region: Belo Horizonte
- Founded: December 12, 1897; 128 years ago

Government
  - Body: Municipal Chamber
  - Mayor: Álvaro Damião (União Brasil)

Area
  - Municipality: 331.354 km^{2} (127.936 sq mi)
  - Urban: 282.3 km^{2} (109.0 sq mi)
  - Metro: 9,459.1 km^{2} (3,652.2 sq mi)
- Elevation: 852 m (2,795 ft)

Population (2025)
  - Municipality: 2,415,872
  - Rank: 6th
  - Density: 7,290.91/km^{2} (18,883.4/sq mi)
  - Urban: 6,198,834
  - Metro: 6,351,680 (3rd)
  - Metro density: 635/km^{2} (1,640/sq mi)
- Demonym: belo-horizontino(a)

GDP (PPP, constant 2015 values)
  - Year: 2023
  - Total (Metro): $84.8 billion
  - Per capita: $15,900
- Time zone: UTC−3 (BRT)
- Postal code: 30000-001 to 31999-999
- Area code: +55 31
- HDI (2010): 0.810 very high
- Website: www.pbh.gov.br

Belo Horizonte (Note: English: UK: /ˈbɛloʊ ˌɒrɪˈzɒnti/ BEL-oh ORR-iz-ON-tee, US: /ˈbeɪloʊ ˌhɒr-/ BAY-loh HORR-; Brazilian Portuguese: [ˈbɛl(w) oɾiˈzõtʃi]; lit. 'Beautiful Horizon'.) is the capital and largest city of the Brazilian state of Minas Gerais. It is the sixth-most-populous city in Brazil, with a population of around 2.4 million, and the third largest metropolitan area, containing a population of 6 million. It is the 13th-largest city in South America and the 18th-largest in the Americas. The metropolis is anchor to the Belo Horizonte metropolitan area, ranked as the third most populous metropolitan area in Brazil and the 17th most populous in the Americas. It is the first planned modern city in Brazil.

The region was first settled in the early 18th century, but the city as it is known today was planned and constructed in the 1890s to replace Ouro Preto as the capital of Minas Gerais. The city features a mixture of contemporary and classical buildings and is home to several modern Brazilian architectural icons, most notably the Pampulha Complex. In planning the city, Aarão Reis and Francisco Bicalho sought inspiration in the urban planning of Washington, D.C. The city has employed notable programs in urban revitalization and food security, for which it has been awarded international accolades.

The city is built on several hills, and is completely surrounded by mountains. There are several large parks in the surroundings of Belo Horizonte. The Mangabeiras Park (Parque das Mangabeiras), 6 km (4 mi) southeast of the city centre in the hills of Curral Ridge (Serra do Curral), has a broad view of the city. It has an area of 2.35 km^{2} (580 acres), of which 0.9 km^{2} (220 acres) is covered by the native forest. The Jambreiro Woods (Mata do Jambreiro) nature reserve extends over 912 hectares (2,250 acres), with vegetation typical of the Atlantic Forest. More than 100 species of birds inhabit the reserve, as well as 10 species of mammals.

Belo Horizonte was one of the host cities of the 1950 and the 2014 FIFA World Cup. Additionally, the city shared as host of the 2013 FIFA Confederations Cup and the football tournament during the 2016 Summer Olympics.

== History ==
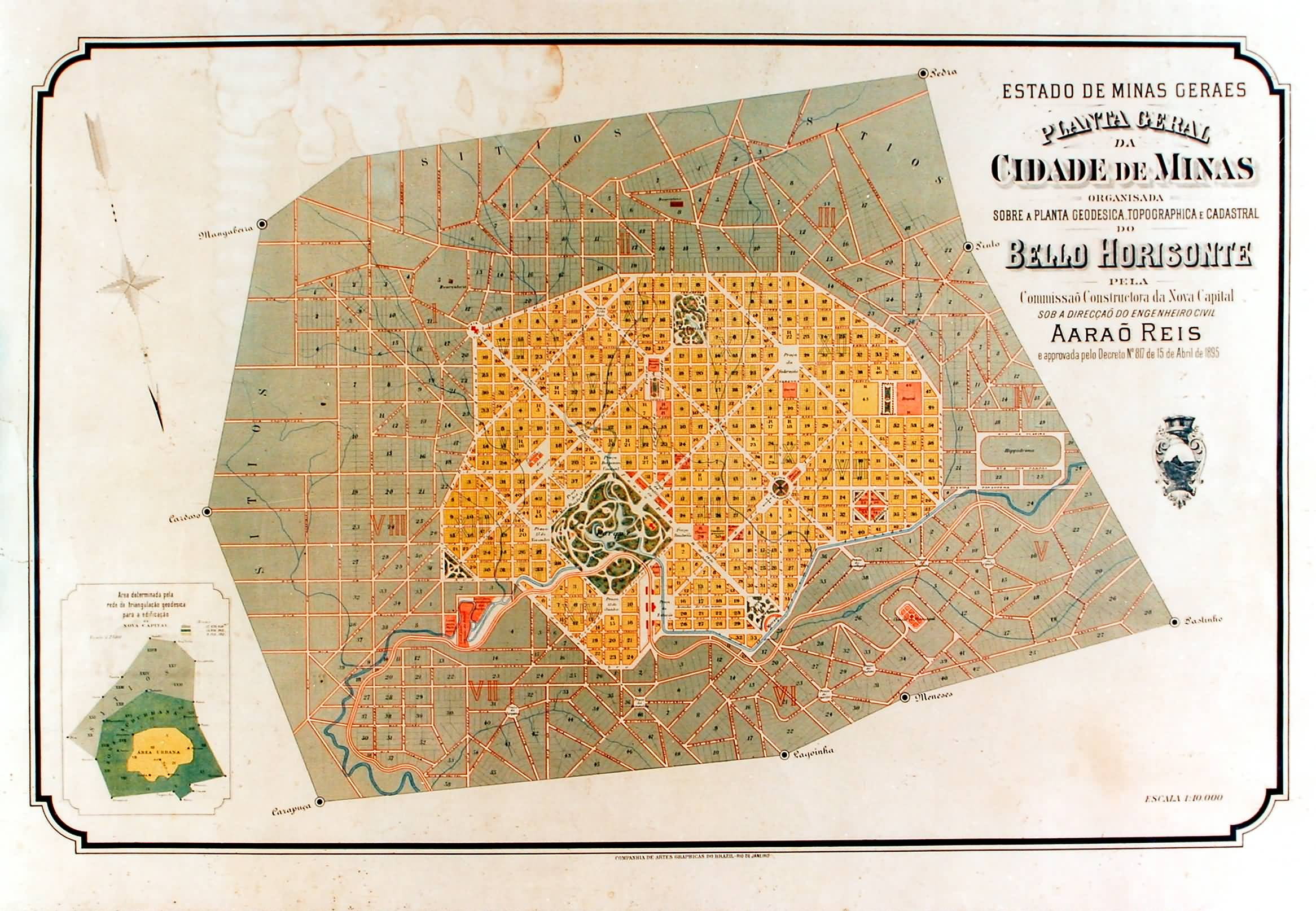
Belo Horizonte plan in 1895

=== Portuguese colonization ===
The metropolis was once a small village, founded by João Leite da Silva Ortiz, a bandeirante explorer from São Paulo. The explorer settled in the region in 1701, leading a gold rush expedition. He then established a farm called "Curral d'el Rey," archaic Portuguese for the "King's Corral". The farm's wealth and success encouraged people from surrounding places to move into the region, and Curral del Rey became a village surrounded by farms.

Another important factor contributing to the growth of the village was people migrating from the São Francisco River region, who had to pass through Curral d'el Rey to reach southern parts of Brazil. Travelers usually visited a small wooden chapel, where they prayed for a safe trip, so the chapel was named Capela da Nossa Senhora da Boa Viagem, which means "Chapel of Our Lady of the Good Journey." After the construction of Belo Horizonte, the old baroque chapel was replaced by a neo-Gothic church that became the city's cathedral.

=== Brazilian empire and republic ===
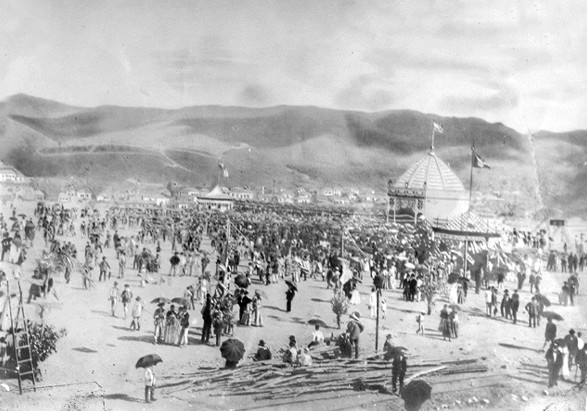
Founding of the city in 1897

The previous capital of Minas Gerais, Ouro Preto (meaning "black gold," due to dark rocks with gold inside found on the region), originally called "Vila Rica" ("wealthy village"), was a symbol of both the monarchic Brazilian Empire and the period when most of Brazilian income was from the mining industry. That never pleased the members of the Inconfidência Mineira, republican intellectuals who conspired against the Portuguese dominion of Brazil.

In 1889 Brazil became a republic, and it was agreed that a new state capital, in tune with a modern and prosperous Minas Gerais, had to be established. In 1893 due to the climatic and topographic conditions, Curral Del Rey was selected by Minas Gerais governor Afonso Pena among other cities as the location for the new economic and cultural center of the state, under the new name of Cidade de Minas, or City of Minas.

Aarão Reis, an urbanist from Pará, was then chosen to design the second planned city of Brazil after Teresina. Cidade de Minas was inaugurated in 1897, with many unfinished buildings as the Brazilian government set a deadline for its completion. The local government encouraged growth through subsidies. It offered free lots and funding for building houses. An interesting feature of Reis' downtown street plan for Belo Horizonte was the inclusion of a symmetrical array of perpendicular and diagonal streets named after Brazilian states and Brazilian indigenous tribes.

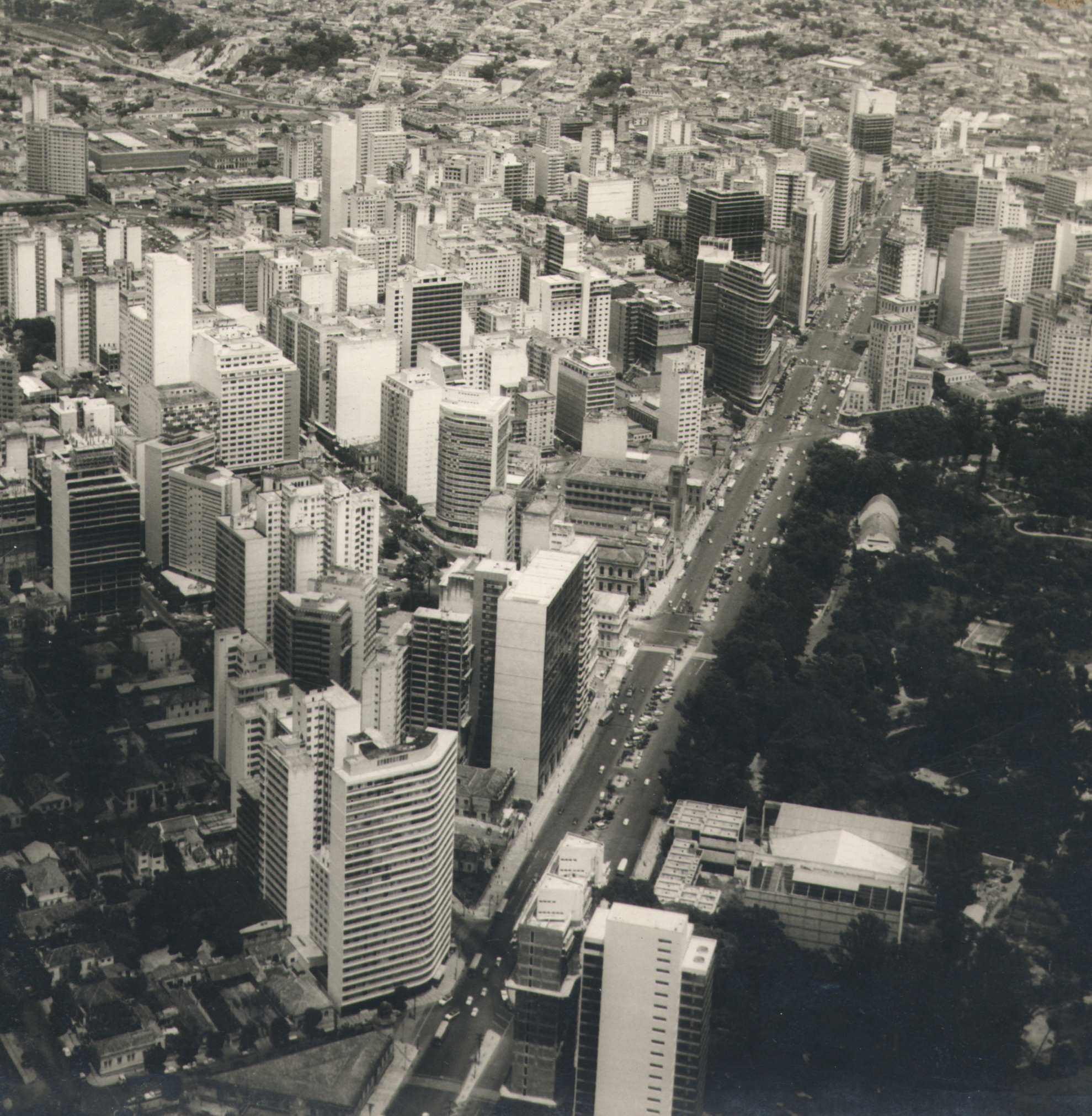
Belo Horizonte, 1970s, National Archives of Brazil

In 1906 the name was changed to Belo Horizonte, which translates to "Beautiful Horizon" in English. The city's name is derived from the surrounding Curral del Rey Mountains, which create a visually striking, hilly ridge that appears as a "beautiful horizon" when viewed from the city. At that time, the city was experiencing a considerable industrial expansion that increased its commercial and service sectors. From its very beginning, the city's original plan prohibited workers from living inside the urban area, which was defined by Avenida do Contorno (a long avenue that goes around the city's central areas). Reserved for government workers (hence the name of the trendy neighbourhood "Funcionários"), and bringing about an accelerated occupation outside the city's area well provided with infrastructure since its very beginning. Naturally, the city's original planners did not count on its ongoing population growth, which proved especially intense in the last 20 years of the 20th century.

In the 1940s a young Oscar Niemeyer designed the Pampulha Neighbourhood to great acclaim, a commission he got thanks to then-mayor and soon-to-be-president Juscelino Kubitschek. These two men are largely responsible for the wide avenues, large lakes, parks, and jutting skylines that characterize the city today. A 1949 American government film favorably reviewed the planning and building of the city.

Belo Horizonte is fast becoming a regional center of commerce. The Latin American research and development center of Google, situated in Belo Horizonte, was responsible for the management and operation of the former social networking website Orkut. It continues to be a trendsetter in the arts, particularly where music, literature, architecture, and the avant garde are concerned.

== Geography ==
=== Surrounding cities and metropolitan area ===
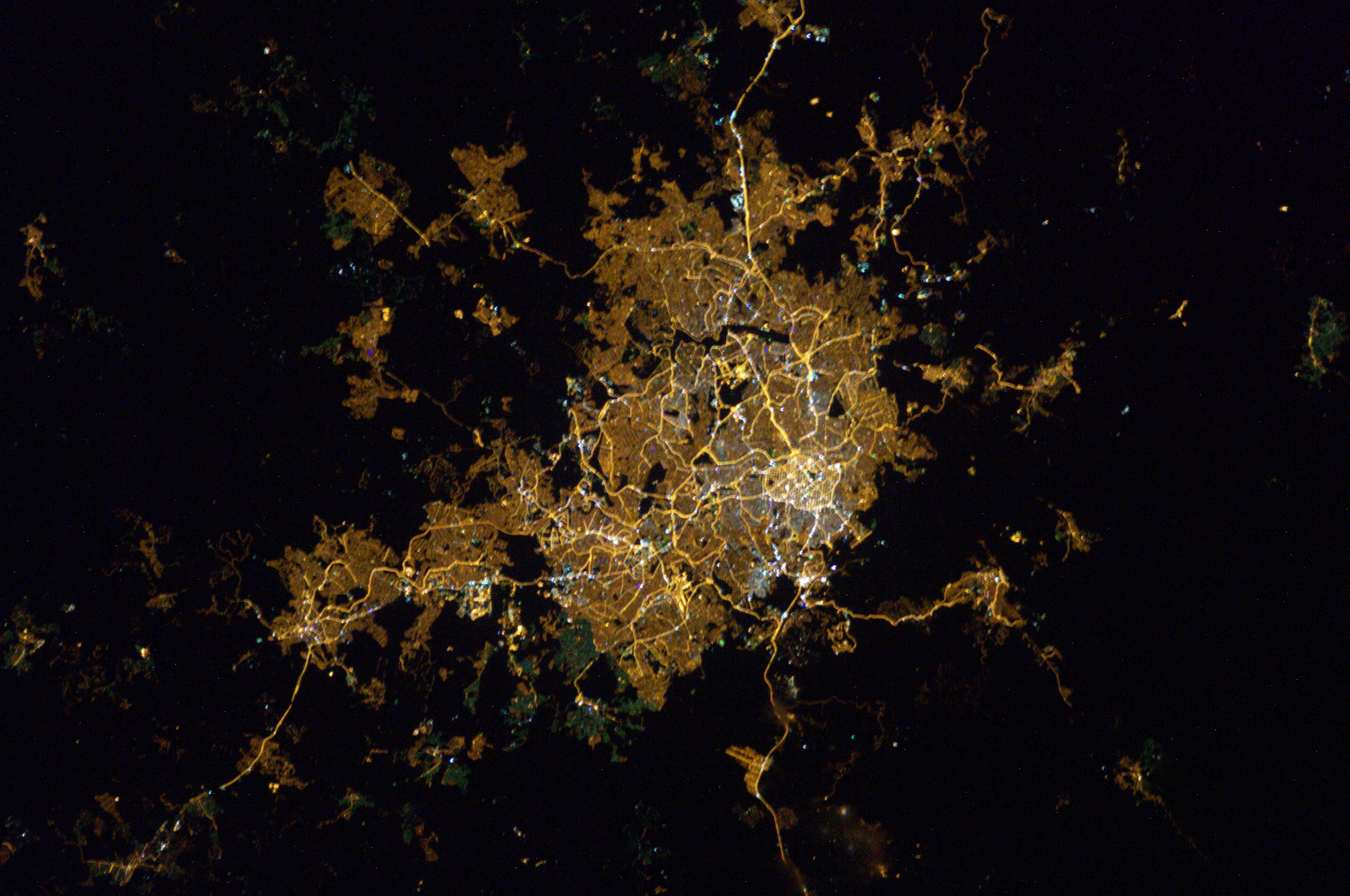
Belo Horizonte from ISS at night

The term "Grande BH" ("Greater Belo Horizonte") denotes any of various definitions for the metropolitan area of Belo Horizonte. The legally defined Metropolitan Region of Belo Horizonte consists of 34 municipalities in total, and a population of around six million inhabitants (as of 2021, according to Brazil's National Institute of Geography and Statistics (IBGE)).

The intense process of urbanization that is taking place in the metropolitan region has made some of the political boundaries between municipalities in the region obsolete. The city is now composed of a relatively contiguous urban area, centred on Belo Horizonte, which extends out into municipalities such as Contagem, Betim, Nova Lima, Raposos, Ribeirão das Neves, Ibirité, Santa Luzia and Sabará, among others. The municipality is bounded to the north by Vespasiano, to the north east by Santa Luzia, by Sabará to the east, by Nova Lima to the southeast, Brumadinho to the south and Ribeirão das Neves, Contagem and Ibirité to the west.

According to the current geographic classification by IBGE, the municipality belongs to the Immediate Geographic Region of Belo Horizonte, in the Intermediate Geographic Region of Belo Horizonte.

=== Geology and geomorphology ===
Belo Horizonte lies on a region of contact between different geological series of the Proterozoic. The geology largely comprises crystalline rocks, which give rise to the varied morphology of the landscape. It is located in a large geological unit known as the craton of São Francisco, referring to extensive crustal nucleus of central-eastern Brazil, tectonically stable at the end of the Paleoproterozoic and bordering areas that suffered the regeneration at the Neoproterozoic.

The archean rocks members of Belo Horizonte complex and supracrustal sequences of the Paleoproterozoic is predominant. The area of Belo Horizonte complex includes the geomorphological unit called Depression of Belo Horizonte, which represents about 70% of the municipality area and has its greatest expression in the northern Ribeirão Arrudas pipeline. The metasedimentary rocks has its area of occurrence on the south of Ribeirão Arrudas pipeline, constituting about 30% of the area of Belo Horizonte. The characteristics of this area are lithological diversities and rugged topography, which has its maximum expression in the Serra do Curral (Corral Ridge), the southern boundary of the municipality.

Its soil comprises a succession of layers of rocks of varied composition, represented by itabirite, dolomite, quartzite, phyllites and schists different from the general direction northwest–southeast and dip to the southeast. The hills of Belo Horizonte are part of the Espinhaço Mountains and belong to the larger Itacolomi mountain chain. The highest point in the municipality is in the Serra do Curral, reaching 1,538 metres (5,046 ft).

=== Parks ===
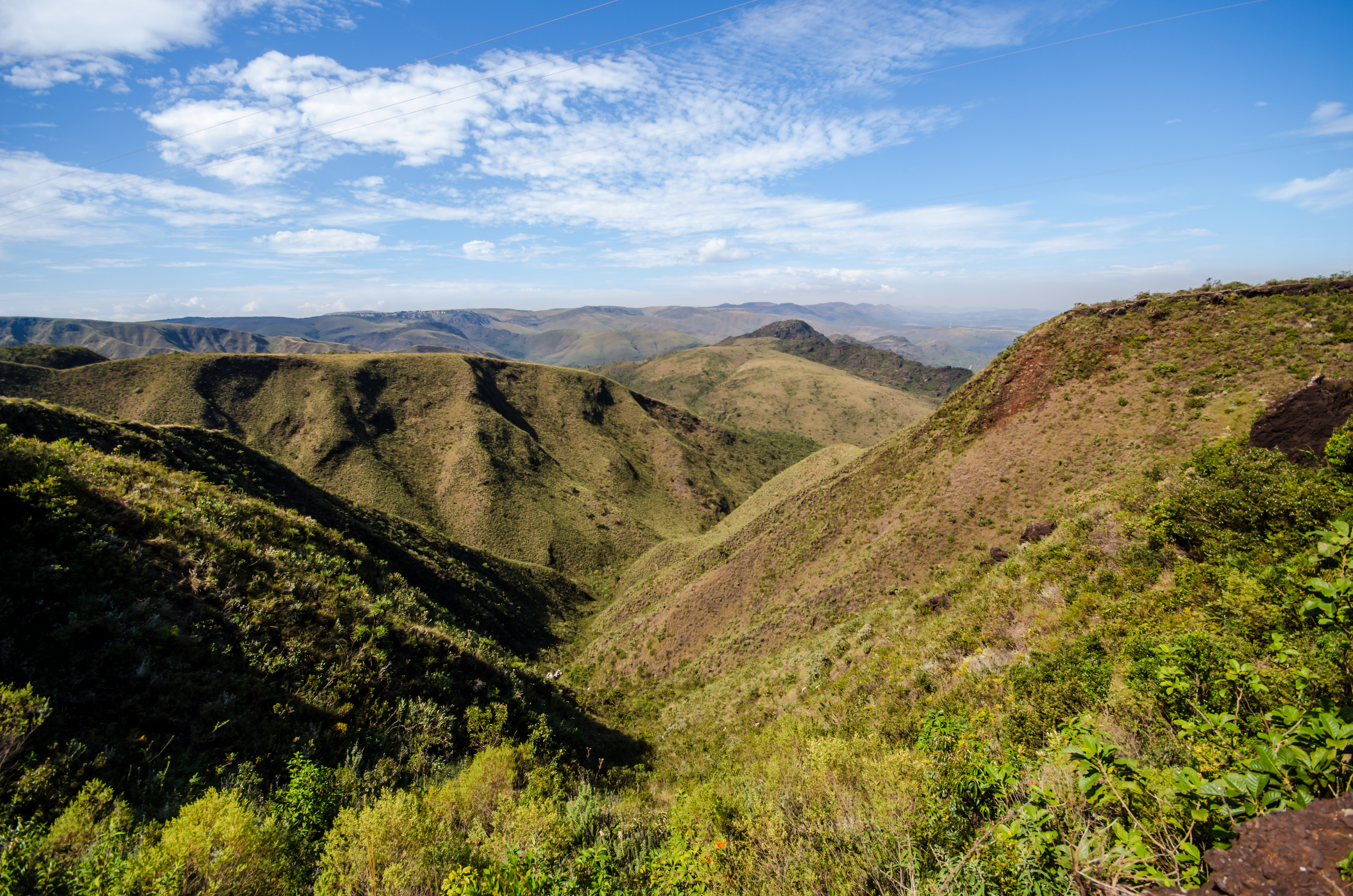
Serra do Rola-Moça State Park

A centre for conservation and preservation of animals and plants it has also developed environmental education projects. The Zoo, which encompasses a total area of 1.4 million square meters, is located at the Foundation's headquarters and is regarded as one of the most complete in Latin America. It has a collection of close to 900 animals representing 200 species, from Brazil and other parts of the world, as well as the first public butterfly sanctuary in South America.

Pampulha Ecological Park is administered by the Zoo-Botanical Foundation of Belo Horizonte and was inaugurated on May 21, 2004. It is 30 acres (12 ha) of green area that offers to the population and the tourists a permanent programming of environmental, cultural and patrimonial education.

The city contains the 102 hectares (250 acres) Baleia State Park, created in 1988 but still not implemented as of 2014. It contains part of the 3,941 hectares (9,740 acres) Serra do Rola-Moça State Park, created in 1994.

=== Climate ===
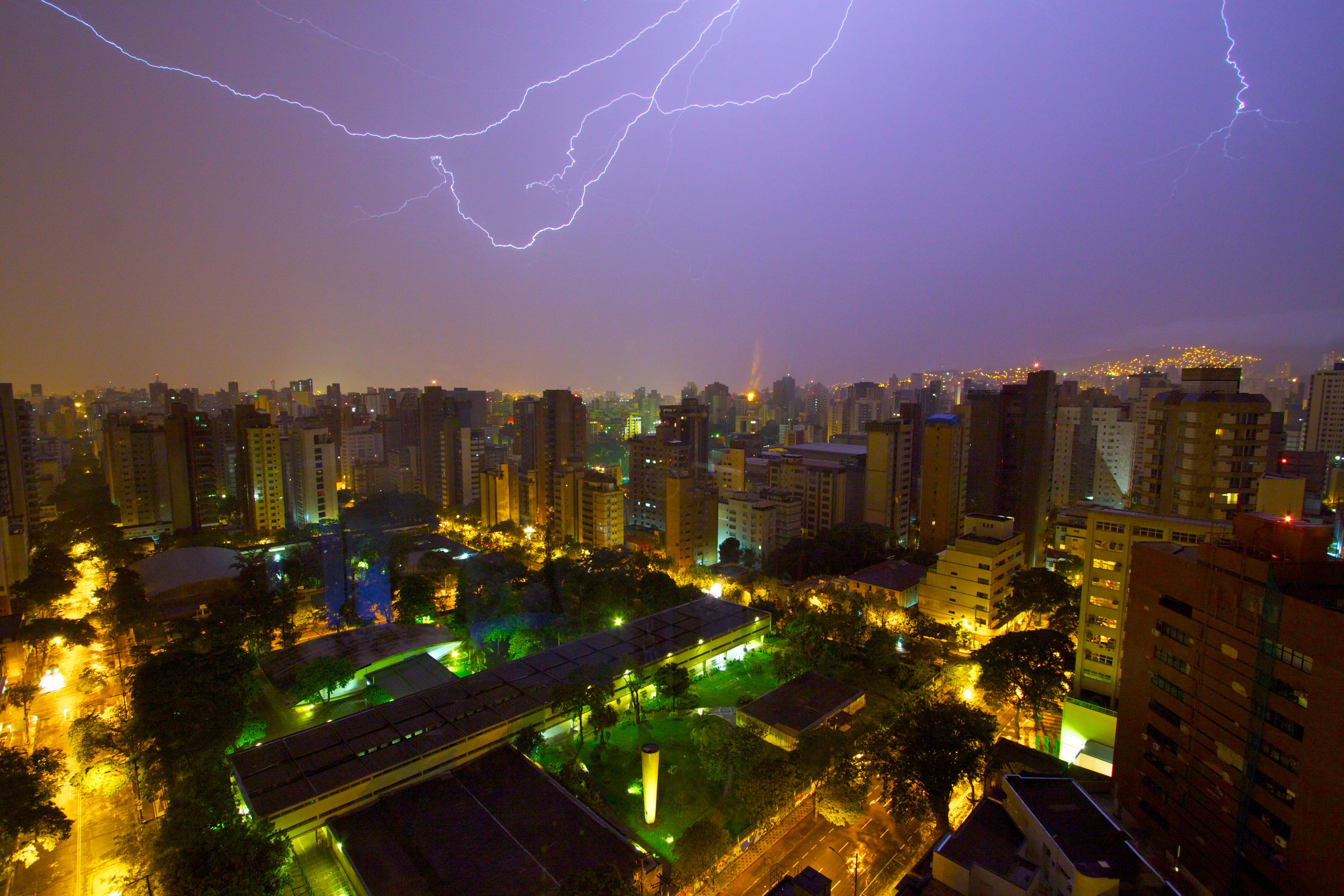
Storm over the city

Due to its inland location, 500 kilometres (310 mi) from the Atlantic Ocean, and elevation of 852 m (2,795 ft), Belo Horizonte has a Köppen climate classification of a tropical savanna climate (Aw). Summers are humid and rainy, but milder than those in nearby, lower-altitude cities, and winters are dry and sunny. The coldest month is generally July, with a lowest recorded temperature of 3.1 °C (38 °F), and the hottest month is usually January.

Climate data for Belo Horizonte (1991–2020, extremes 1949–present)
| Month | Jan | Feb | Mar | Apr | May | Jun | Jul | Aug | Sep | Oct | Nov | Dec | Year |
|---|---|---|---|---|---|---|---|---|---|---|---|---|---|
| Record high °C (°F) | 35.4 (95.7) | 35.2 (95.4) | 33.9 (93.0) | 32.8 (91.0) | 32.9 (91.2) | 30.5 (86.9) | 32.0 (89.6) | 34.0 (93.2) | 36.6 (97.9) | 38.4 (101.1) | 36.0 (96.8) | 34.8 (94.6) | 38.4 (101.1) |
| Mean daily maximum °C (°F) | 28.7 (83.7) | 29.1 (84.4) | 28.4 (83.1) | 27.6 (81.7) | 25.7 (78.3) | 24.9 (76.8) | 24.9 (76.8) | 26.3 (79.3) | 27.9 (82.2) | 28.7 (83.7) | 27.7 (81.9) | 28.2 (82.8) | 27.3 (81.1) |
| Daily mean °C (°F) | 23.7 (74.7) | 24.0 (75.2) | 23.5 (74.3) | 22.6 (72.7) | 20.6 (69.1) | 19.6 (67.3) | 19.4 (66.9) | 20.5 (68.9) | 22.0 (71.6) | 23.0 (73.4) | 22.7 (72.9) | 23.3 (73.9) | 22.1 (71.8) |
| Mean daily minimum °C (°F) | 20.0 (68.0) | 20.2 (68.4) | 19.8 (67.6) | 18.8 (65.8) | 16.6 (61.9) | 15.4 (59.7) | 15.2 (59.4) | 15.8 (60.4) | 17.4 (63.3) | 18.8 (65.8) | 18.9 (66.0) | 19.5 (67.1) | 18.0 (64.4) |
| Record low °C (°F) | 10.4 (50.7) | 10.0 (50.0) | 11.7 (53.1) | 8.4 (47.1) | 7.4 (45.3) | 3.1 (37.6) | 5.4 (41.7) | 6.2 (43.2) | 8.8 (47.8) | 9.4 (48.9) | 9.1 (48.4) | 12.8 (55.0) | 3.1 (37.6) |
| Average precipitation mm (inches) | 330.9 (13.03) | 177.7 (7.00) | 197.5 (7.78) | 82.3 (3.24) | 28.1 (1.11) | 11.4 (0.45) | 5.4 (0.21) | 10.6 (0.42) | 49.2 (1.94) | 110.1 (4.33) | 236.0 (9.29) | 339.1 (13.35) | 1,578.3 (62.14) |
| Average precipitation days (≥ 1.0 mm) | 15 | 10 | 11 | 7 | 3 | 1 | 1 | 1 | 4 | 8 | 14 | 17 | 92 |
| Average relative humidity (%) | 69.3 | 66.2 | 68.6 | 66.3 | 64.3 | 62.6 | 58.4 | 54.0 | 55.3 | 59.9 | 68.5 | 71.0 | 63.7 |
| Average dew point °C (°F) | 17.9 (64.2) | 17.6 (63.7) | 17.7 (63.9) | 16.5 (61.7) | 14.1 (57.4) | 12.9 (55.2) | 11.7 (53.1) | 11.4 (52.5) | 12.9 (55.2) | 15.0 (59.0) | 16.8 (62.2) | 17.9 (64.2) | 15.2 (59.4) |
| Mean monthly sunshine hours | 182.6 | 190.8 | 190.0 | 201.5 | 215.4 | 223.8 | 236.6 | 244.8 | 211.2 | 204.4 | 164.7 | 162.0 | 2,427.8 |
Source 1: Instituto Nacional de Meteorologia
Source 2: NOAA (dew point), Meteo Climat (record highs and lows)

== Demographics ==
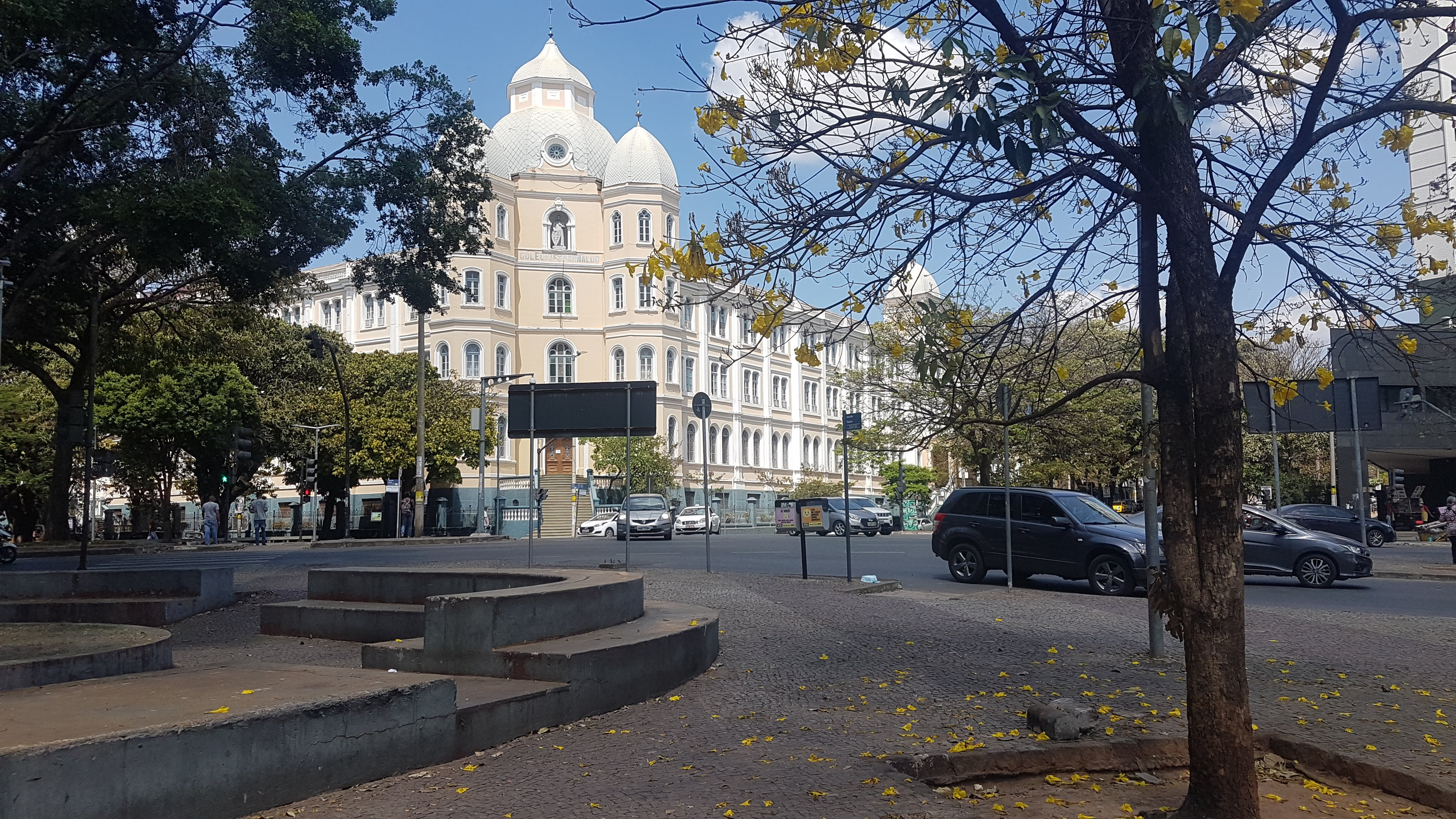
João Pessoa Square in Belo Horizonte.

=== Ethnic groups ===
Race and ethnicity in Belo Horizonte
| Ethnicity | Percentage |
| White | 43.6% |
| Pardo (Multiracial) | 42.6% |
| Black | 13.5% |
| Asian | 0.2% |
| Amerindian | 0.1% |

Historical population
| Year | Pop. | ±% |
|---|---|---|
| 1970 | 1,235,030 | — |
| 1980 | 1,780,839 | +44.2% |
| 1991 | 2,020,161 | +13.4% |
| 2000 | 2,238,526 | +10.8% |
| 2010 | 2,375,151 | +6.1% |
| 2022 | 2,315,560 | −2.5% |

According to the 2022 census, there were 2,315,560 people residing in the city of Belo Horizonte. The census revealed the following numbers: 1,008,878 White people (43.6%), 986,302 Pardo (Multiracial) people (42.6%), 312,920 Black people (13.5%), 4,881 Asian people (0.2%), 2,486 Amerindian people (0.1%).

In 2010, the city had 428,893 opposite-sex couples and 1,090 same-sex couples. The population of Belo Horizonte was 53.1% female and 46.9% male.

The Metropolitan Region of Belo Horizonte, called Greater Belo Horizonte, is the 3rd most populous of Brazil, after only Greater São Paulo (with 19,672,582 people, first in Brazil and 5th in the world) and Greater Rio de Janeiro (with 14,387,000 people). The city is the 6th most populous of the country.

During the 18th century, Minas Gerais received many Portuguese immigrants, mainly from Northern Portugal as well as many enslaved Africans. Belo Horizonte has a notable Italian influence; around 30% of the city's population have some Italian origin. The Italian culture is present in the cuisine, dance, and language. People of German, Spanish, French, and Syrian-Lebanese ancestries also make up sizeable groups.

=== Religion ===
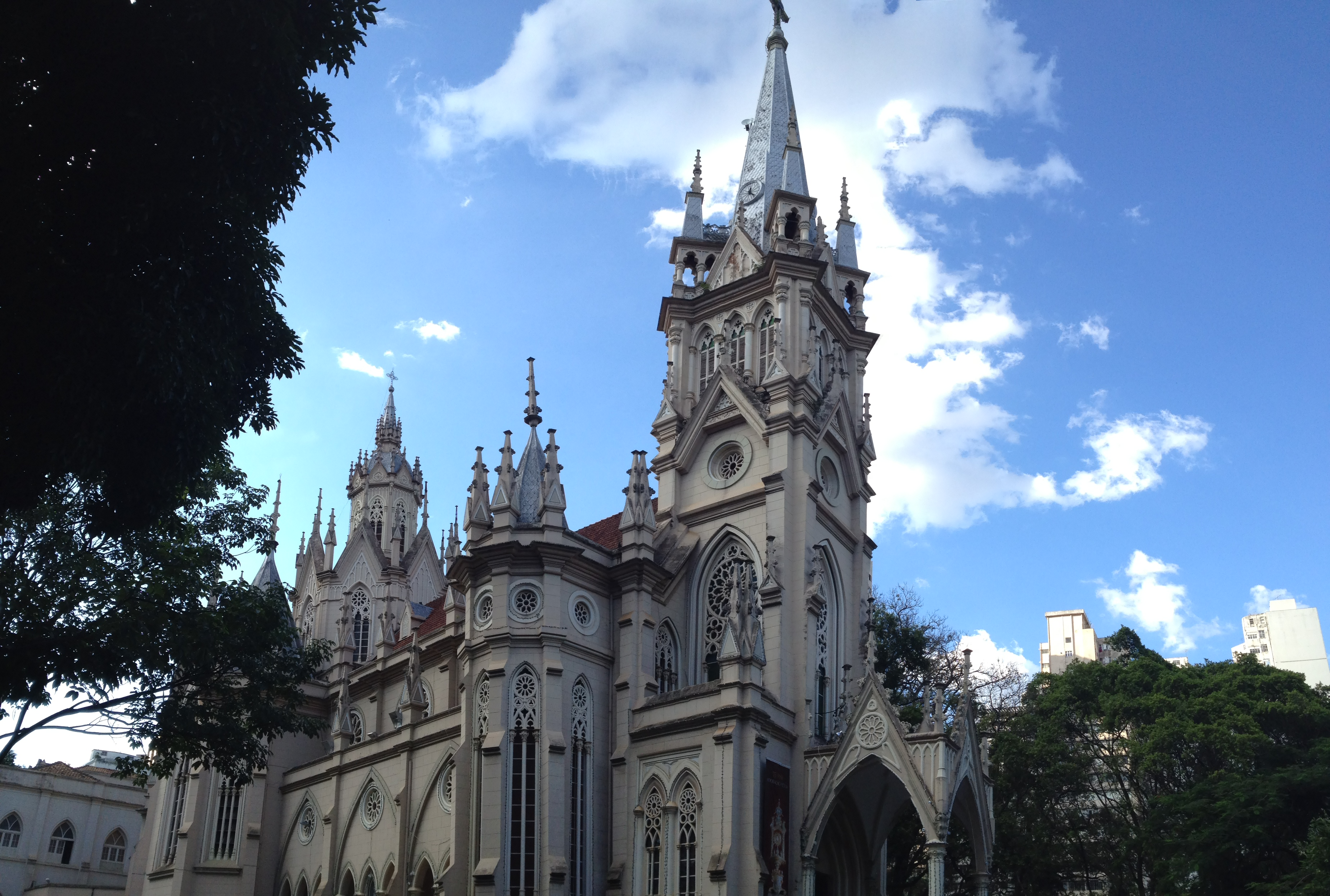
Our Lady of Good Voyage Cathedral is the seat of the Roman Catholic Archdiocese of Belo Horizonte.

| Religion | Percentage | Number |
|---|---|---|
| Catholic | 53.13% | 1,104,297 |
| Protestant | 27.29% | 567,090 |
| No religion | 8.02% | 202,727 |
| Other | 4.99% | 103,748 |
| Spiritist | 3.92% | 81,537 |
| Umbanda and Candomblé | 0.82% | 17,080 |
| Unknown | 0.05% | 1,019 |
| Undeclared | 0.02% | 503 |
| Indigenous religion | 0.01% | 309 |

Source: IBGE 2022.

The Catholic Church includes the territory of the municipality of Belo Horizonte and 28 other municipalities in the ecclesiastical jurisdiction of the Archdiocese of Belo Horizonte, which has Divinópolis, Luz, Oliveira and Sete Lagoas as suffragan dioceses. The archbishop's see is in the Cathedral of Our Lady of Boa Viagem. Some of the churches in Belo Horizonte have great artistic value, especially the Church of São Francisco de Assis, in Pampulha. The church's architectural design was by Oscar Niemeyer and its structural calculations were by Joaquim Cardoso. Its interior houses the Stations of the Cross, made up of 14 panels by Cândido Portinari, considered one of his most significant works. The external panels are by Cândido Portinari (figurative panel) and Paulo Werneck (abstract panel). The gardens were designed by Burle Marx. Alfredo Ceschiatti sculpted the bronze bas-reliefs in the baptistery. Other shrines worth mentioning are the Basilica of Our Lady of Lourdes with its neo-Gothic style, in the Lourdes neighborhood; the Church of São José, in the hypercenter and the Church of São Judas Tadeu, in the Graça neighborhood. The Catholic Church recognizes Our Lady of Boa Viagem as the city's patron saint.

=== Human development ===
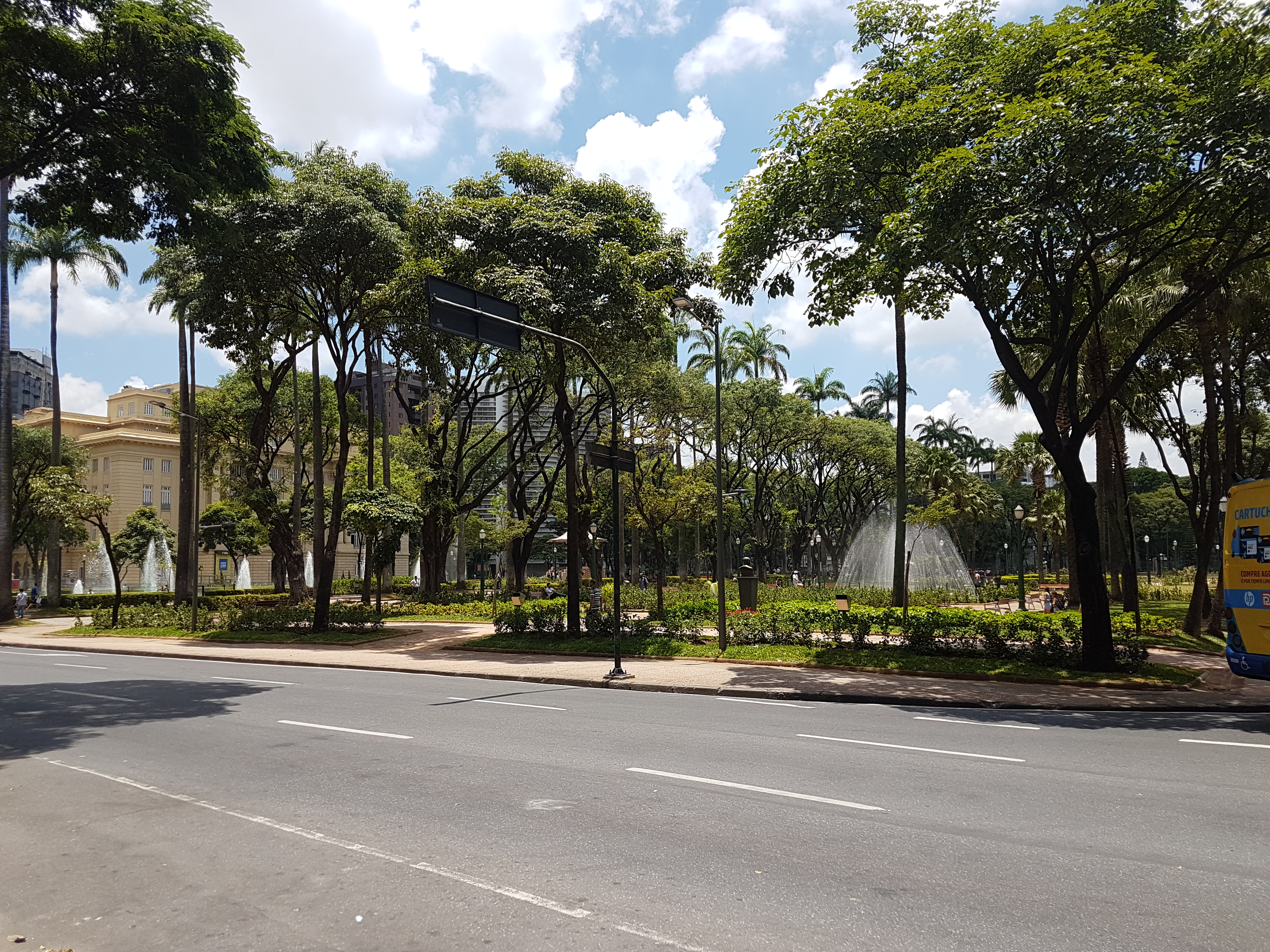
Savassi is a developed neighbourhood in Belo Horizonte.

In 1993, under mayor Patrus Ananias de Souza, the city started a series of innovations based on its citizens having the "right to food." These include, for example, creating farmers' markets in the town to enable direct sales and regularly surveying market prices and posting the results across the city. The city's process of participatory budgeting was linked with these innovations, as a result of which the infant mortality rate was reduced by 50% in a decade.

There is some evidence that these programs have helped support a higher quality of life for the local farmers partnering with the city and that this may be having positive effects on biodiversity in the Atlantic rainforest around the city. The city's development of these policies garnered the first "Future Policy Award" in 2009, awarded by the World Future Council, a group of 50 activists (including Frances Moore Lappé, Vandana Shiva, Wes Jackson, and Youssou N'Dour) concerned with the development and recognition of policies to promote a just and sustainable future.

The city has undertaken an internationally heralded project called Vila Viva ("Living Village" in Portuguese) that promises to "urbanize" the poorest areas (favelas), relocating families from areas with high risk of floods and landslides but keeping them in the same neighborhood, paving main avenues to allow public transportation, police and postal service to have access. All the work is done with 80% of locals, reducing unemployment and increasing family income. Former mayor Fernando da Mata Pimentel was nominated for World Mayor in 2005 on the strength of these and other programs.

== Economy ==
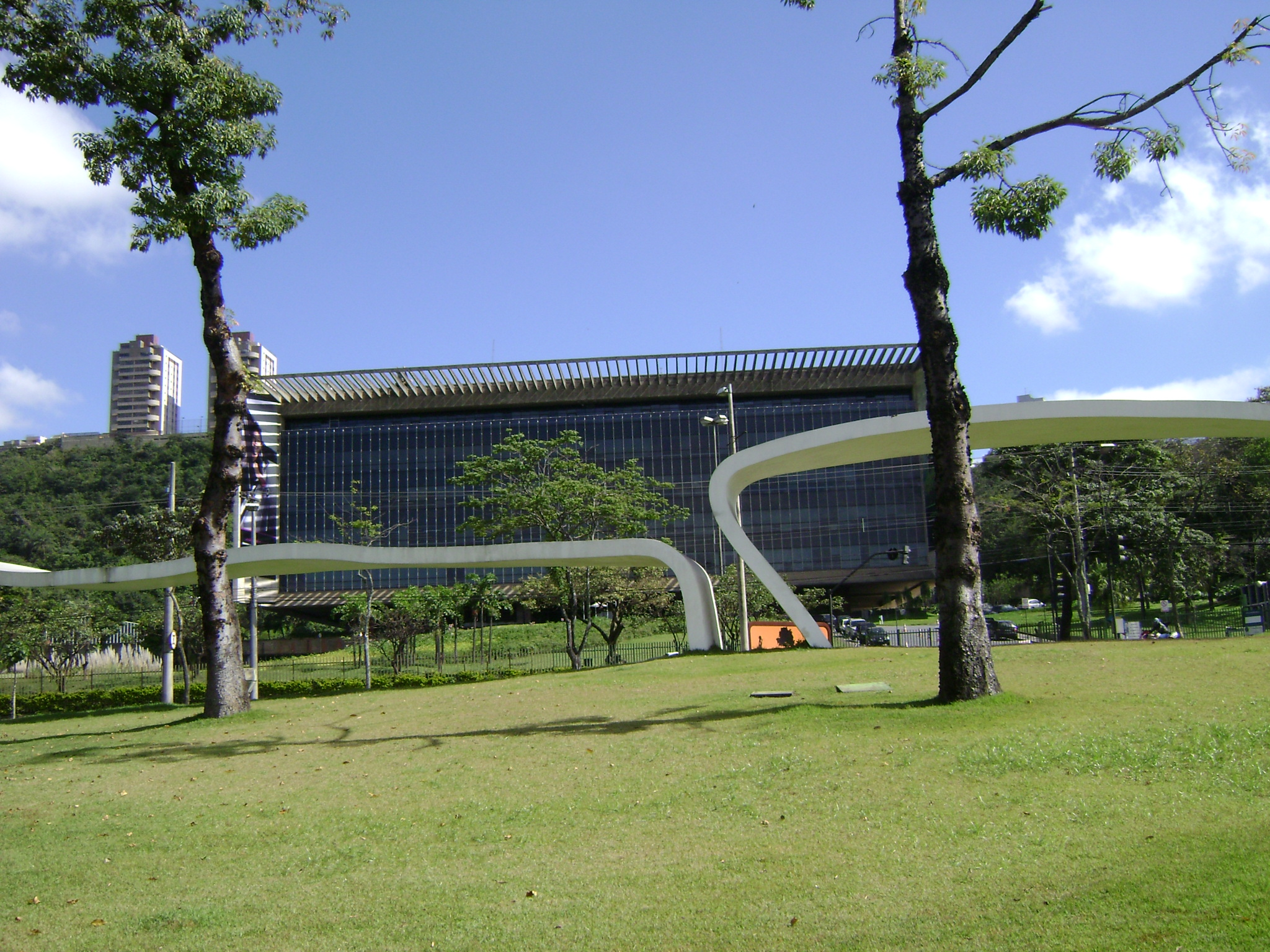
Former headquarters of Usiminas in Pedro Melo Square

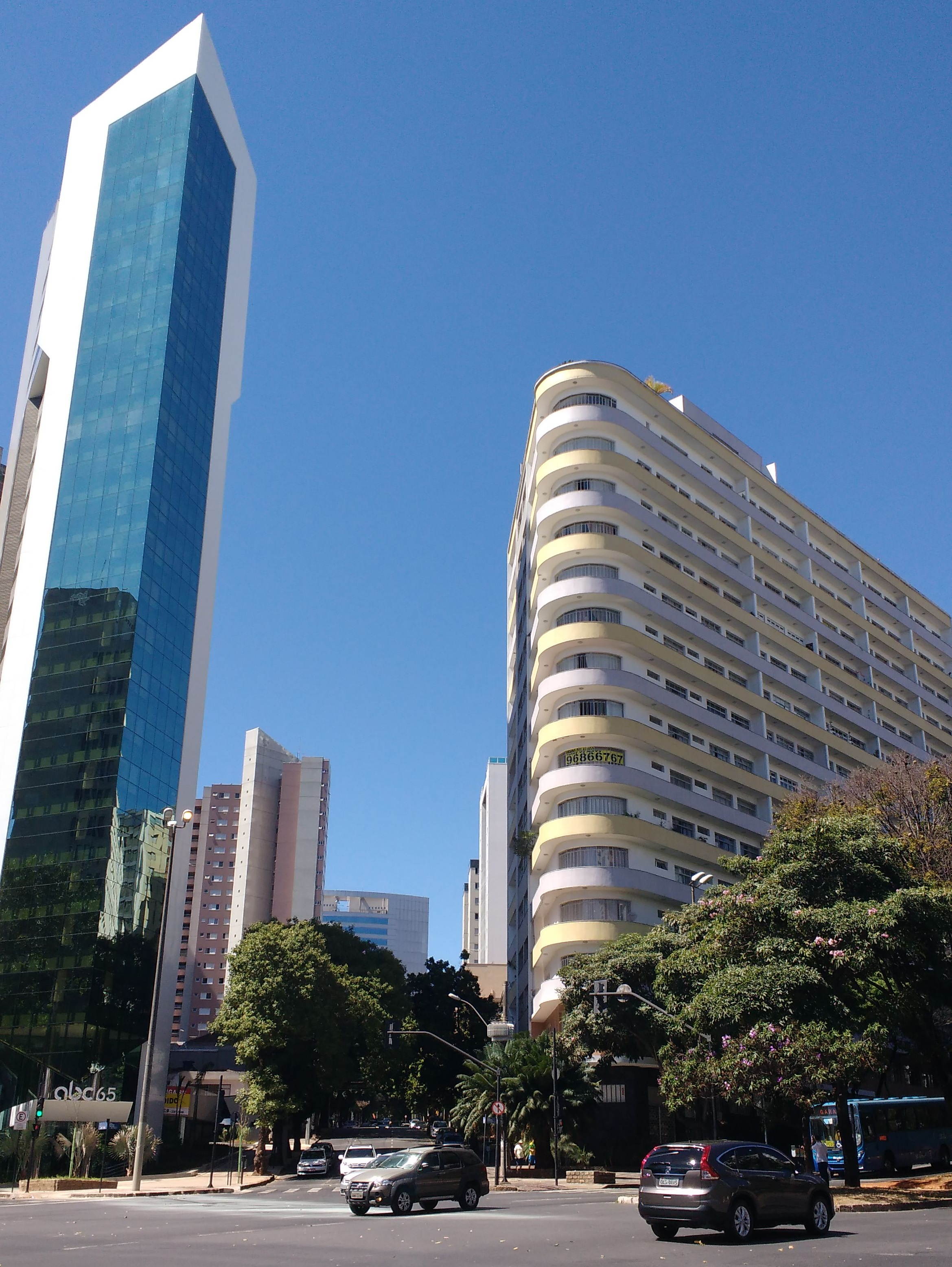
Business district

Belo Horizonte receives large numbers of visitors, as it is in the Brazilian main economic axis, exerting influence even on other states. Multinational and Brazilian companies, such as Google, Deloitte, Thoughtworks, Localiza and Oi, maintain offices in the city. The service sector plays a very important role in the economy of Belo Horizonte, being responsible for 85% of the city's Gross Domestic Product (GDP), with other industry making up most of the remaining 15%. Belo Horizonte has a developed industrial sector, being traditionally a hub of the Brazilian steel-making and metallurgical industries, as the state of Minas Gerais has always been very rich in minerals, specifically iron ore.

Belo Horizonte is the distribution and processing centre of a rich agricultural and mining region and the nucleus of a burgeoning industrial complex. Production is centred on steel, steel products, automobiles, and textiles. Gold, manganese, and gemstones mined in the surrounding region are processed in the city. The main industrial district of the city was set during the 1940s in Contagem, a part of greater Belo Horizonte. Multinational companies like FIAT (which opened its plant in Betim in 1974), Arcelor, and Toshiba have subsidiaries in the region, along with textiles like Group Rachelle Textil, Ematex and Cedro Textil, cosmetic, food, chemicals, pharmaceuticals, furnishing and refractory companies.

Among the companies headquartered in the city are steel producer Açominas (held by Gerdau, one of the largest multinationals originated in Brazil); Usiminas; Belgo-Mineira (held by Arcelor); Acesita (partially held by Arcelor); mobile communication Vivo; and Telecom Italia Mobile, Dasein Executive Search, executive coaching company, as well as the NYSE-listed electrical company CEMIG. Leading steel product makers Sumitomo Metals of Japan and Vallourec of France also have plans to construct an integrated steel works on the outskirts of the city.

There are also a large number of small enterprises in the technology sector with regional to nationwide success, particularly in the fields of computing and biotechnology. Because of both governmental and private funding in the diversification of its economy, the city has become an international reference in Information Technology and Biotechnology, and is also cited because of the advanced corporate and university research in Biodiesel fuel. The number of jobs in the Information sector has been growing at annual rates above 50%. The Belo Horizonte Metropolitan Area, composed of 33 cities under the capital's direct influence, is home to 16% of the country's biotechnology companies, with annual sales of over R$550 million.

Projects in these fields are likely to expand because of integration between universities, the oil company Petrobras and the Brazilian Government. One of the largest events that ever took place in the city, the Inter-American Development Bank meeting, occurred in 2005 and attracted people from all over the world. For a long time Belo Horizonte was marked by the predominance of its industrial sector, but from the 1990s there has been a constant expansion of the service sector economy, particularly in computer science, biotechnology, business tourism, fashion and the jewelry-making. The city is considered to be a strategic leader in the Brazilian economy. The move towards business tourism transformed the capital into a national hub for this segment of the tourist industry.

- In 2008, the city's GDP was R$42 billion (or about US$26,2 billion).
- In 2008, the Greater Belo Horizonte's GDP was R$98,5 billion (or about US$61 billion).
- In 2008, the city's per capita income was R$17,313 (or US$10,820). In 2007, it was R$15,830 (about US$9,893).

== Education ==
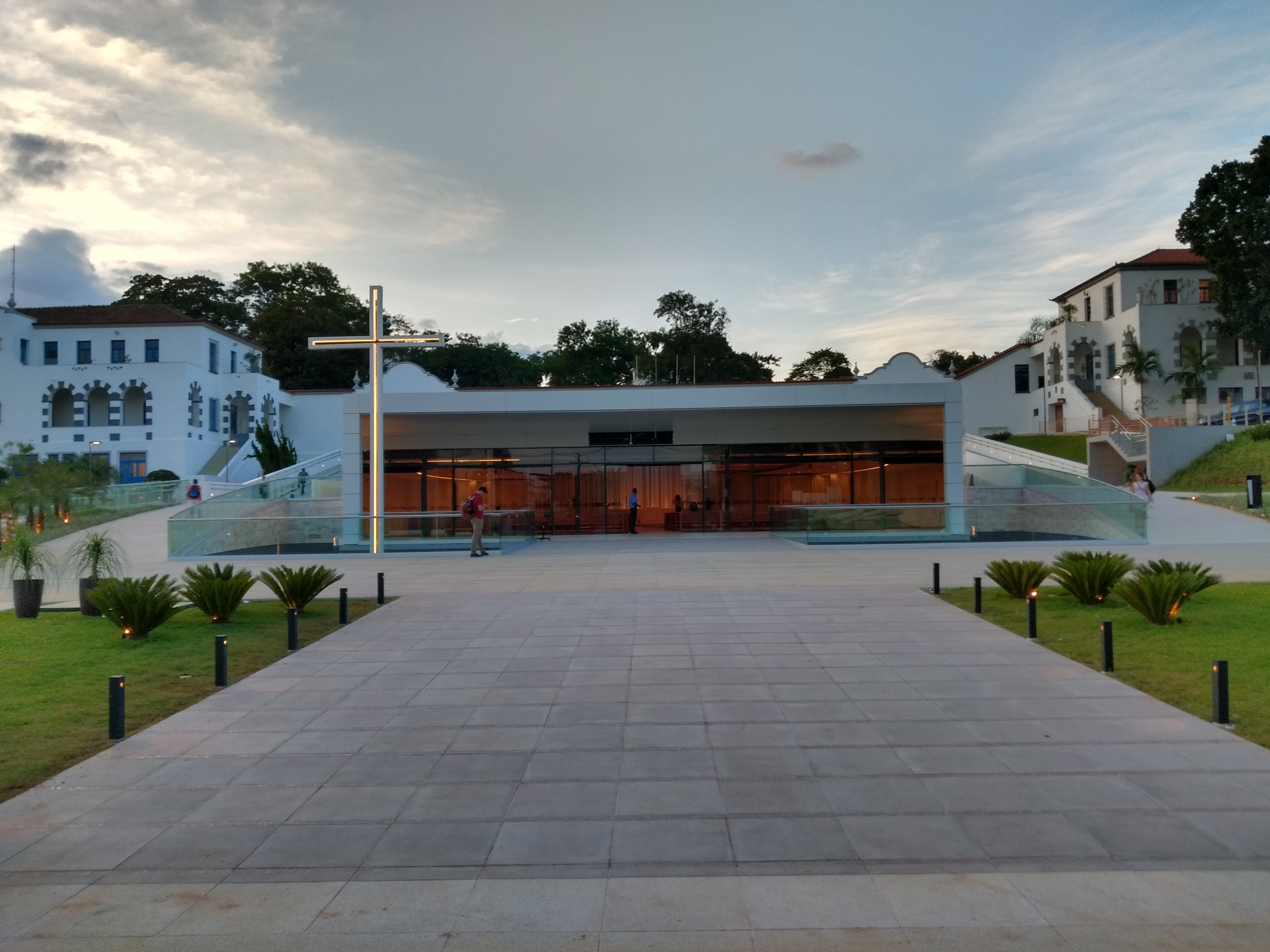
Pontifical Catholic University of Minas Gerais

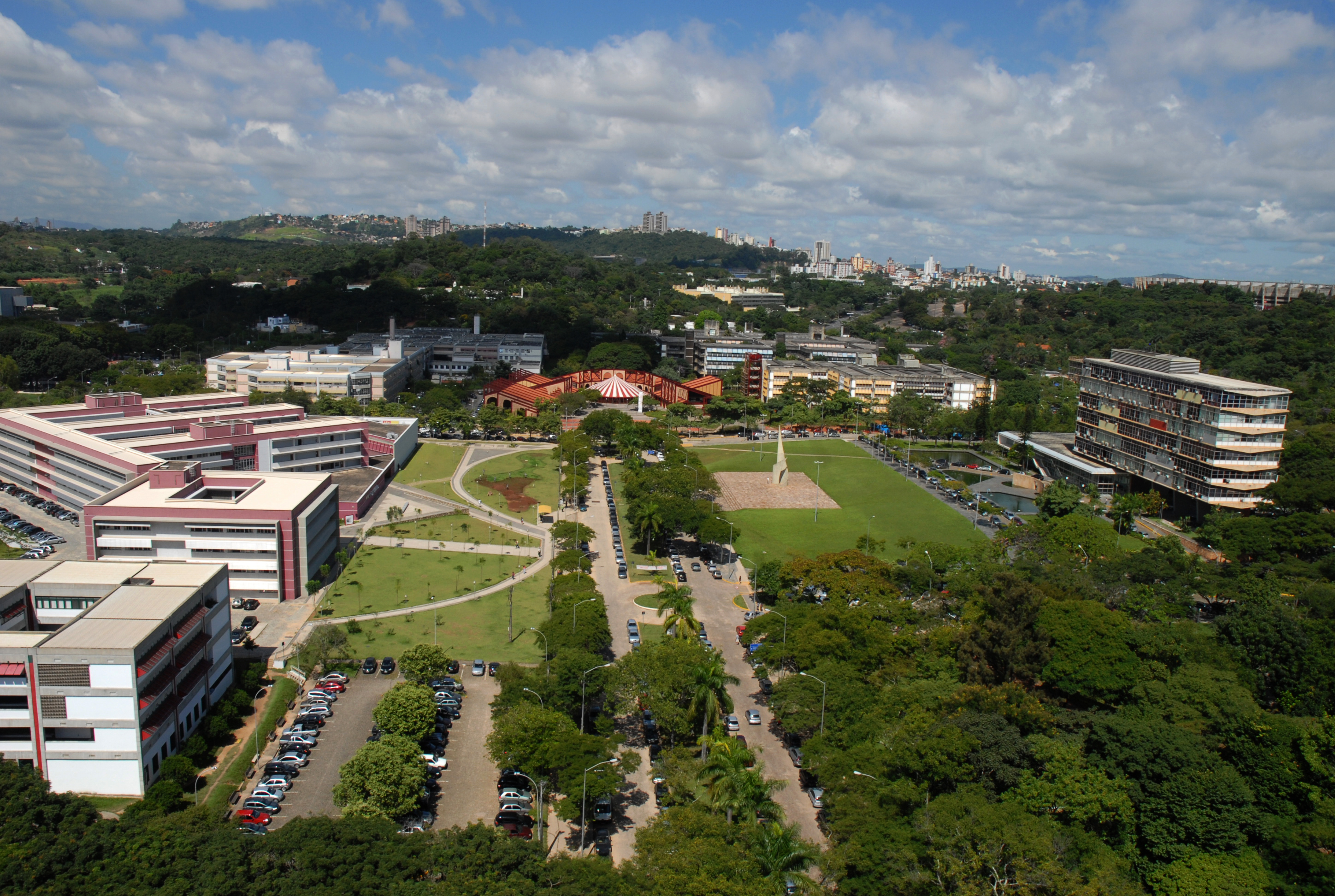
Federal University of Minas Gerais

=== Educational institutions ===
Several higher education institutions are located in Belo Horizonte, including:

- Baptist College of Minas Gerais
- Centro Universitário de Belo Horizonte (UNI-BH)
- Centro Universitário Newton Paiva
- Centro Universitário (UNA)
- Escola Superior Dom Helder Câmara (ESDHC) – Specialized in Law
- Faculdade Jesuíta de Filosofia e Teologia (FAJE)
- Faculty of Medical Sciences of Minas Gerais (FCM-MG)
- Faculdade Pitágoras de Belo Horizonte (FP-BH)
- Faculdades Kennedy (FKBH)
- Instituto Federal de Educação, Ciência e Tecnologia de Minas Gerais (IFMG)
- Skema Business School (SK)
- Pontifícia Universidade Católica de Minas Gerais (PUC-MG)
- Universidade do Estado de Minas Gerais (UEMG) (State University of Minas Gerais)
- Universidade Federal de Minas Gerais (UFMG)
- Universidade Federal de Ciência e Inovação de Minas Gerais (UFCIMG)
- Universidade José do Rosário Vellano (UNIFENAS)
- Universidade FUMEC (FUMEC)
- Universidade Cruzeiro do Sul Educacional

== Transport ==
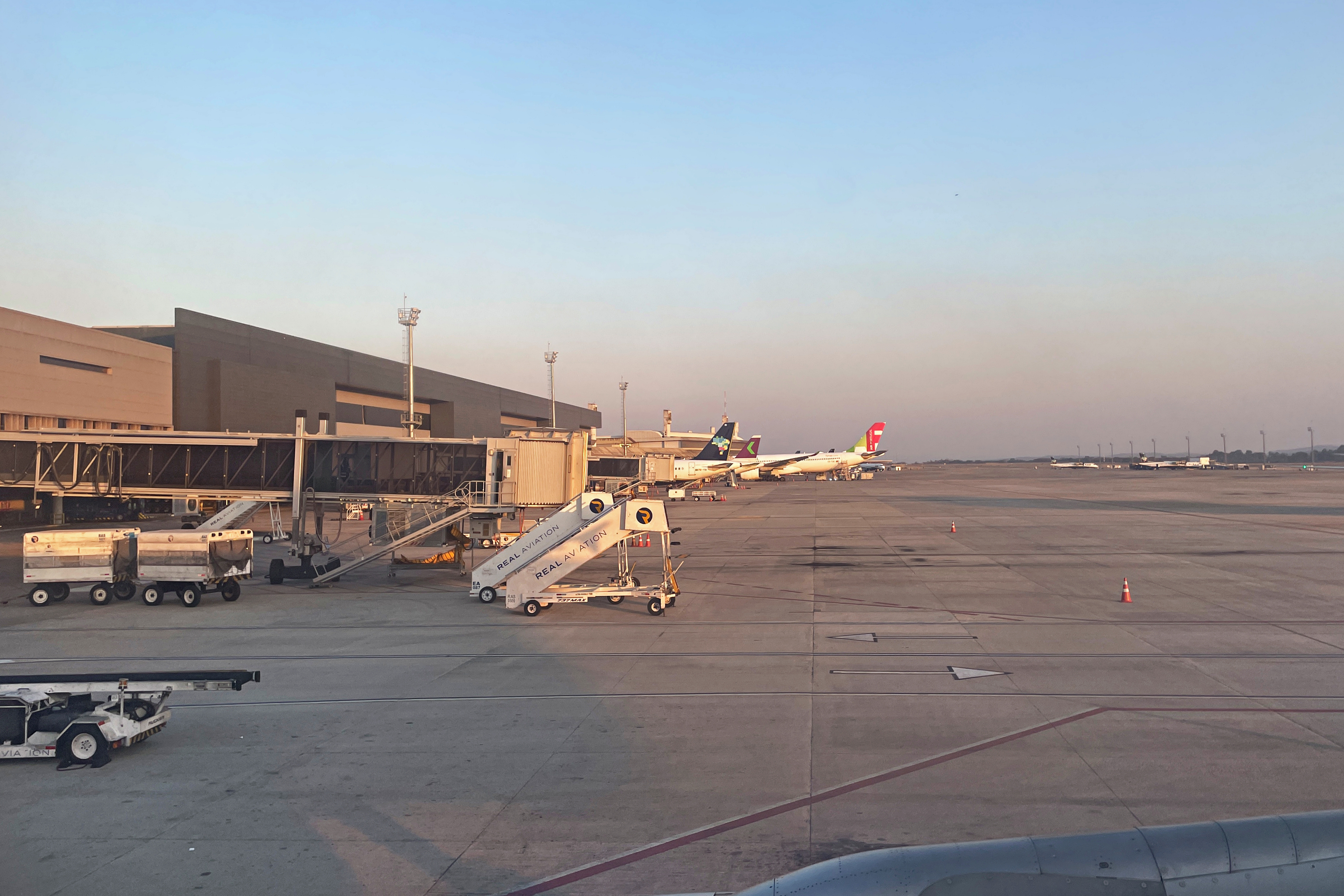
Tancredo Neves/Confins International Airport

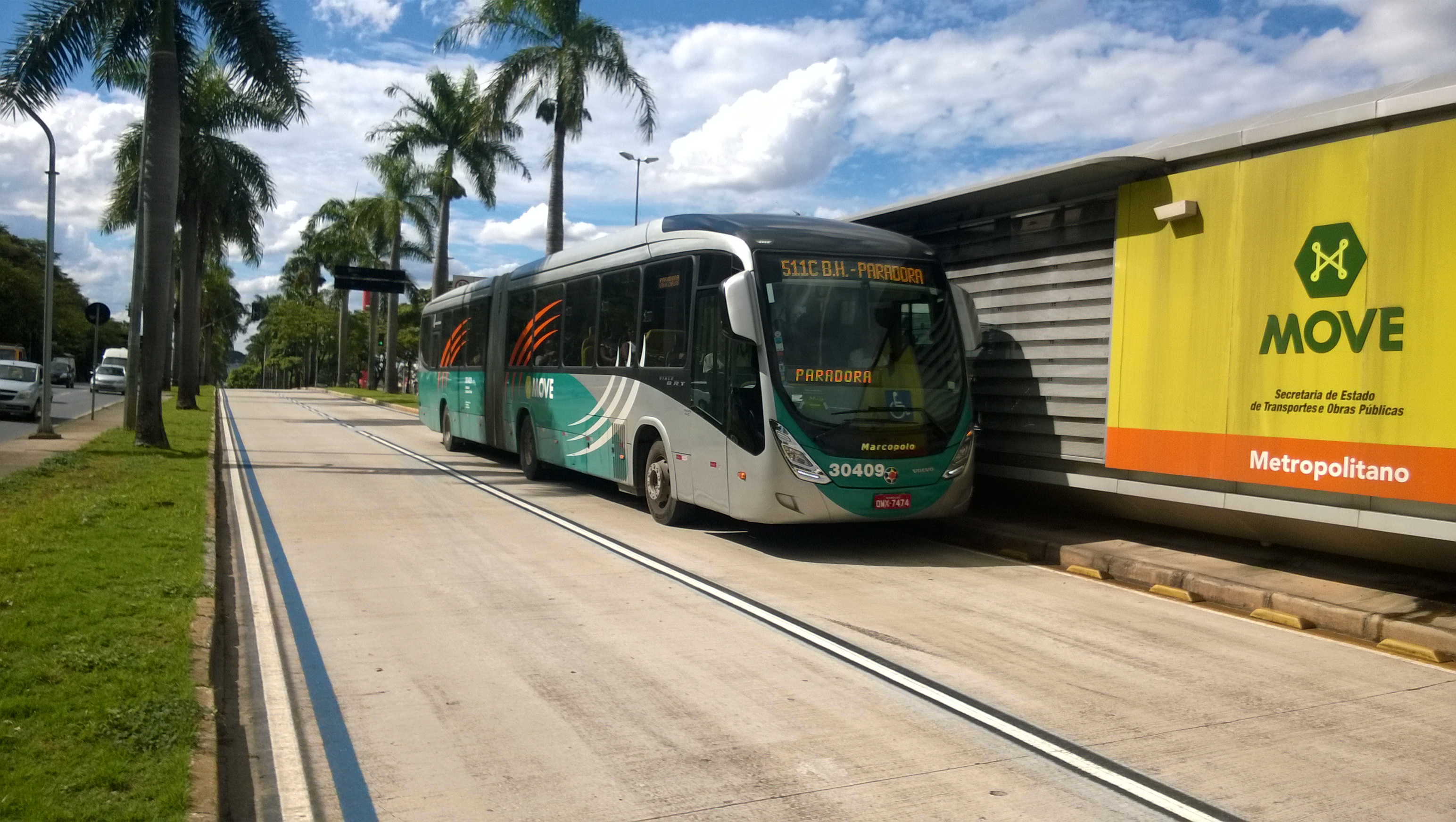
BRT

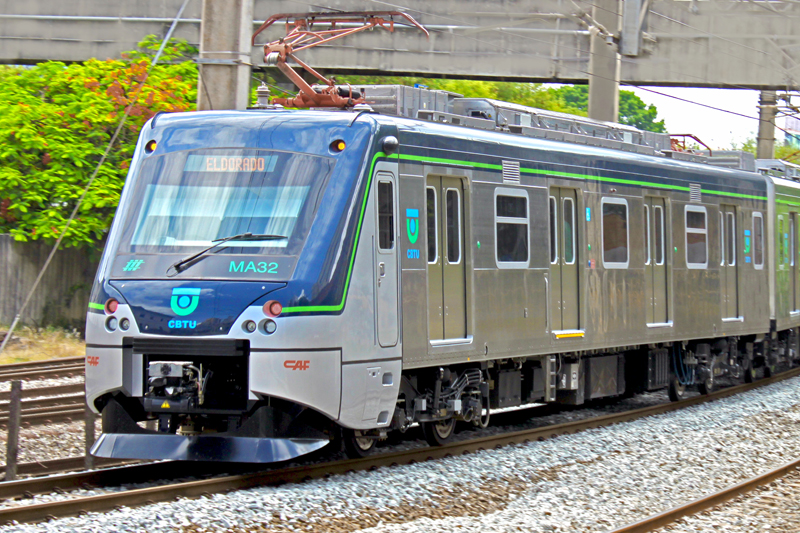
Belo Horizonte Metro

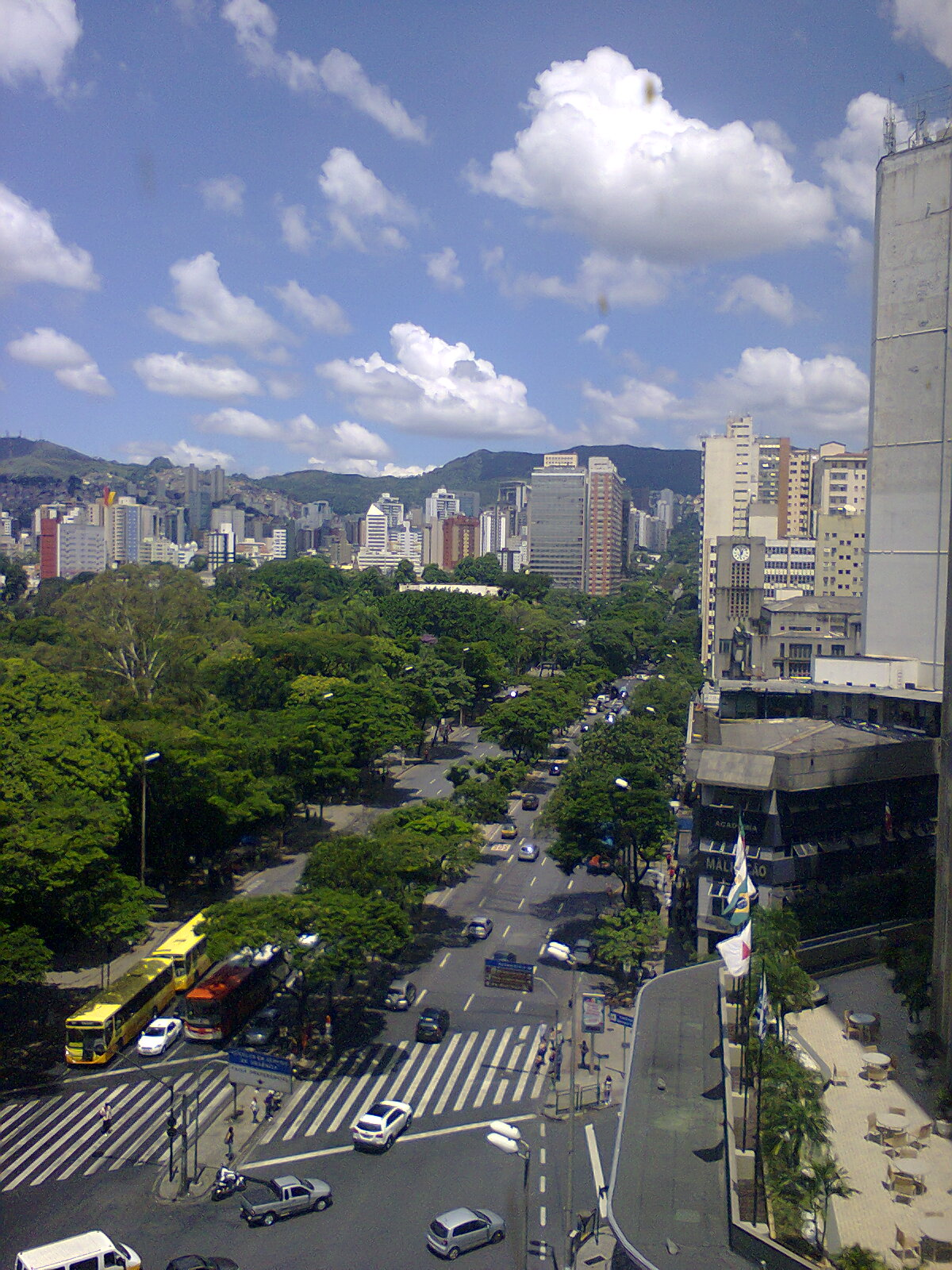
Afonso Pena Avenue

=== Airports ===
Belo Horizonte is served by two airports:

- Tancredo Neves/Confins International Airport, dedicated to domestic and international traffic. It is located in the municipalities of Lagoa Santa and Confins, 38 kilometres (24 mi) from Belo Horizonte, and was opened in January 1984. Plans for gradual expansion to meet growing demand had been already drawn up from the airport's inception. The airport has one of the lowest rates of shutdown for bad weather in the country. It ran at limited capacity until 2005, when a large proportion of Pampulha Airport air traffic was transferred to Confins. There are direct international flights to/from Buenos Aires, Fort Lauderdale, Lisbon, Orlando, Panama City, and Santiago;
- Pampulha – Carlos Drummond de Andrade Airport, dedicated to general aviation.

=== Highways ===
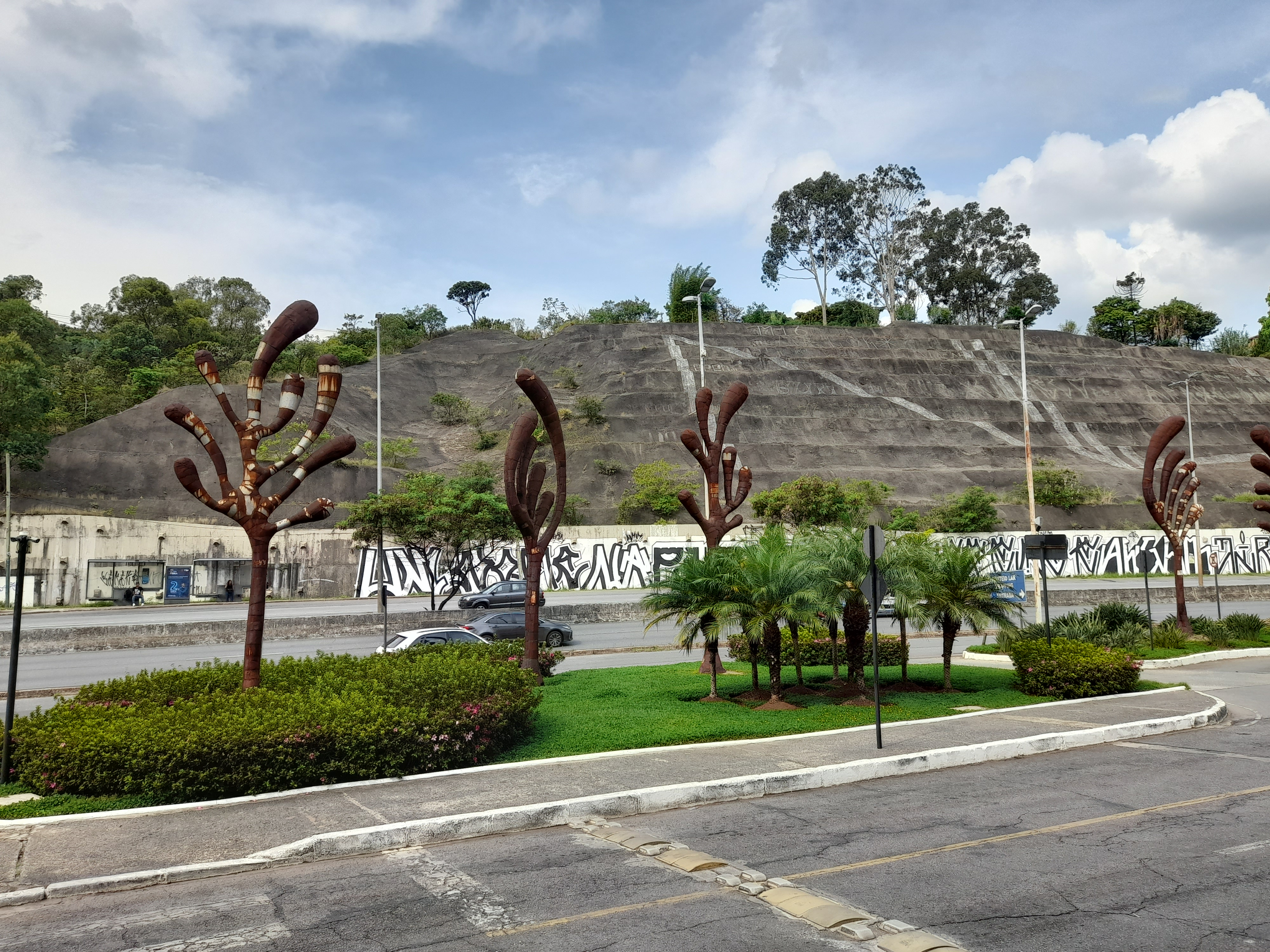
BR-356 in front of Ponteio Lar Shopping

The city is connected to the rest of Minas Gerais state and the country by a number of roadways. Minas Gerais has the country's largest federal highway network.

- BR-040 connects Belo Horizonte to Rio de Janeiro (going south) and Brasília (going northwest). It also links other cities in the state, such as Juiz de Fora, Conselheiro Lafaiete, Barbacena, Sete Lagoas, and Paracatu.
- BR-262 begins in Mato Grosso do Sul and ends in Espírito Santo, crossing Minas Gerais from west to east. It links Belo Horizonte to Pará de Minas, Araxá, Manhuaçu, Uberaba, Governador Valadares, and Vitória, the capital of Espírito Santo state.
- BR-381 is an important federal highway. It connects Belo Horizonte to São Paulo.
- MG-010 is a state highway that connects the capital to the Tancredo Neves International Airport, itself located in the municipalities of Confins and Lagoa Santa, which are part of the metropolitan area of Belo Horizonte. Starting in 2005, several flights were transferred from the Pampulha Regional Airport to the international airport. To improve access to the international airport, MG-010 is being expanded (effectively duplicating its lanes).

The city is also served by other minor roads such as state highways MG-020, MG-050, MG-030, and MG-433. There is also an East-West Express Way, which goes from the city to the nearby industrial centres of Contagem and Betim (together having a population of ca. 900,000), and Anel Rodoviário, a kind of "beltway" – indeed it is not circumferential, but connects many highways, such as the federal (BR-ones) so it is not necessary for a large number of cars and trucks to pass through the city centre. Many of these roads are in poor condition, but in the last years many revitalization and rebuilding projects have been started.

=== Bus system ===
The bus system has a large number of bus lines going through all parts in the city, and is administered by BHTRANS. Among the upcoming projects are the expansion of the integration between bus lines and the metro, with integrated stations, many already in use. And the construction of bus corridors, with lanes and bus stops exclusively for the bus lines. Keeping buses from traffic congestions, making the trips more viable for commuters.

=== Railways ===
Belo Horizonte Metro or MetroBH started operating at the end of the 1970s. There is one line, with 19 stations, from Vilarinho to Eldorado Station, in Contagem, transporting over 160,000 people daily. The current projects of expansion include Line 2, linking the existing Calafate Station to the region of Barreiro. And Line 3, from the city's main bus terminal to São Inácio de Loyola, Savassi economical district. Line 2 is planned to be overground (similar to the current line) and Line 3 is planned to be underground, passing through the city's financial centre, Praça Sete and Afonso Pena Avenue. Also, Line 1 is planned to be extended to Novo Eldorado Station.

For long distance, Belo Horizonte is served by the Vitória-Minas Railway. There are daily passenger trips connecting Belo Horizonte to Cariacica, in the metropolitan region of Vitória, Espírito Santo. On its route, the railway also connects Belo Horizonte to several locations on Eastern Minas Gerais, such as Governador Valadares, João Monlevade and the cities of the Vale do Aço Metropolitan Region.

=== Belo Horizonte Public Transportation statistics ===
The average amount of time people spend commuting with public transit in Belo Horizonte, for example to and from work, on a weekday is 85 min. 26% of public transit riders, ride for more than 2 hours every day. The average amount of time people wait at a stop or station for public transit is 23 min, while 50% of riders wait for over 20 minutes on average every day. The average distance people usually ride in a single trip with public transit is 8.7 km, while 19% travel for over 12 km in a single direction.

== Culture ==
=== Music ===
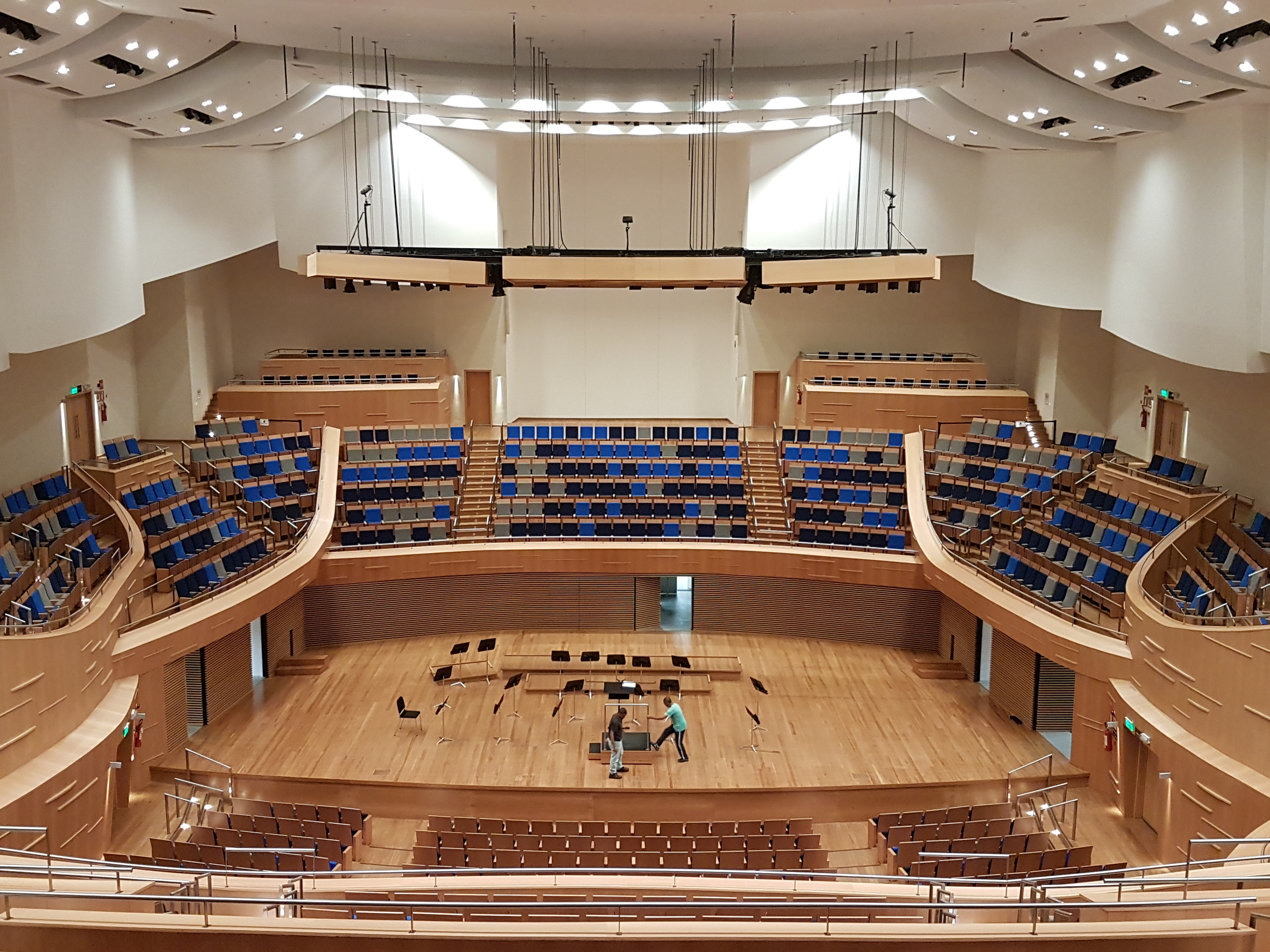
Sala Minas Gerais, at the Centro de Cultura Presidente Itamar Franco, is the house of the Minas Gerais Philharmonic Orchestra.

Clube da Esquina is one of the most important musical movements in the musical history of Brazil. It originated in the mid-1960s, and since then its members have been hugely influential in Brazilian and even international music, some like Milton Nascimento and Toninho Horta achieving worldwide acclaim. Other people involved in the movement include musicians, songwriters, composers, conductors and lyricists, such as Tavinho Moura, Wagner Tiso, Andersen Viana, Milton Nascimento, Lô Borges, Beto Guedes, Flávio Venturini, Toninho Horta, Márcio Borges and Fernando Brant, among others.

The band Uakti, known for performing with self-built musical instruments, originated in Belo Horizonte under the influence of Walter Smetak and the Composition School from Bahia. Also, several nationally famous rock groups have been founded in Belo Horizonte, including Jota Quest, Pato Fu, Skank, 14 Bis and Tianastácia. In later years, Belo Horizonte has been more frequently included in Brazilian tours of foreign mainstream and independent acts.

Belo Horizonte is also known as the Brazilian Capital of Metal music, hence the huge number of heavy metal bands (and the likes) founded there, especially in the 1980s. Most importantly, Overdose, the first metal band from BH and one of the first to gain prominence in Brazil; Sepultura, the world's best known Brazilian metal band; and Sarcófago, one of the founders of modern black metal. The contemporary Christian music band Diante do Trono, is also of Belo Horizonte. A short instrumental song by American band Earth, Wind & Fire is named after the city on their album Now, Then & Forever.

Other genres are also popular, such as Sertanejo music, and it also has its own Funk carioca scene, being extremely popular among youngsters.

=== Museums ===
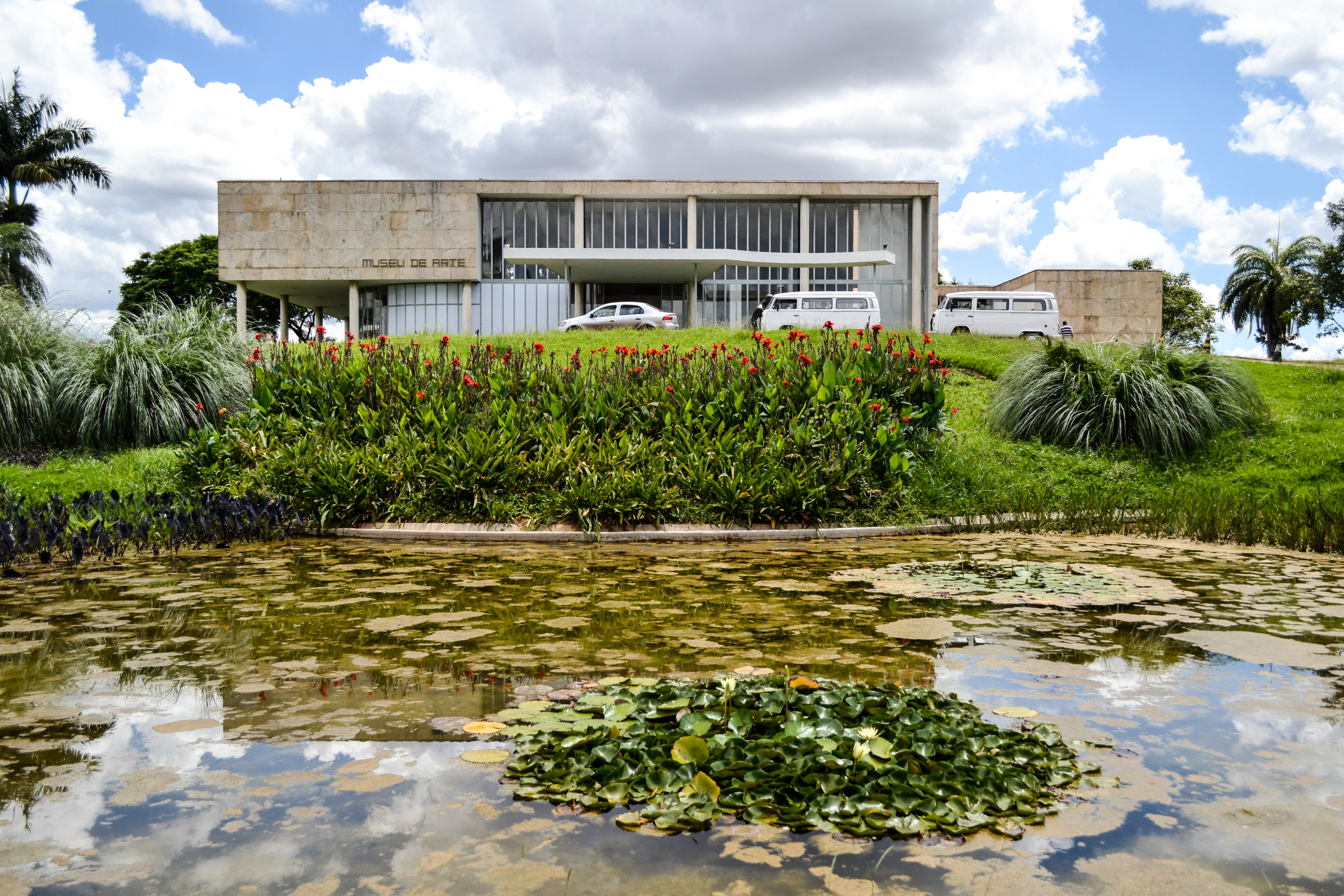
Pampulha Art Museum

Belo Horizonte features a number of museums including the Mineiro Museum, the Abílio Barreto Historic Museum, Arts and Workmanship Museum, a Natural History Museum and the UFMG Botanic Gardens, a telephone museum, the Pampulha Art Museum, the Professor Taylor Gramke Mineralogy Museum, and the UFMG Conservatory. The puppet theatre group Giramundo was established here in 1970, and continues to maintain a puppetry museum hosting a collection of their creations.

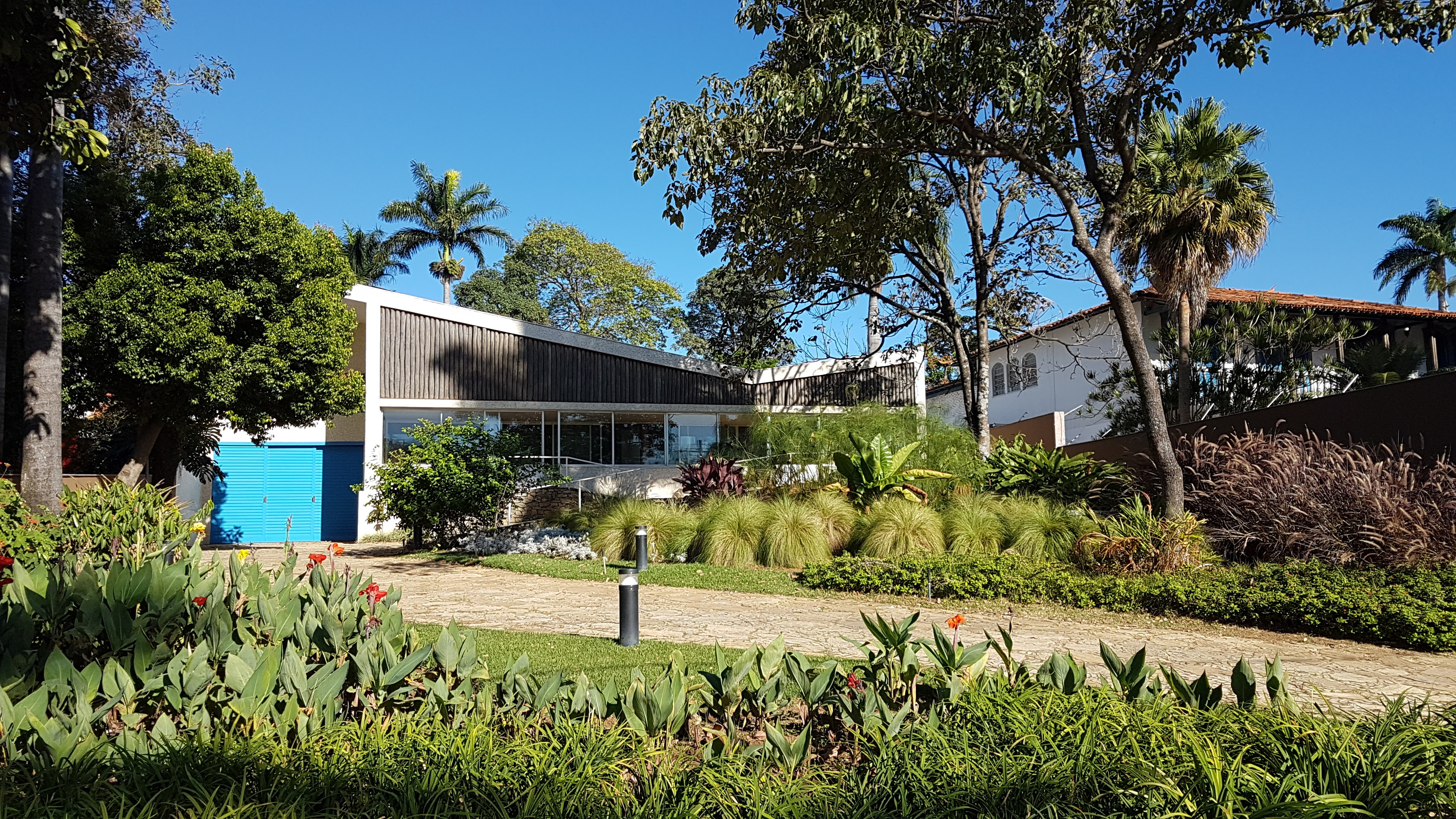
Kubitschek Residence Museum

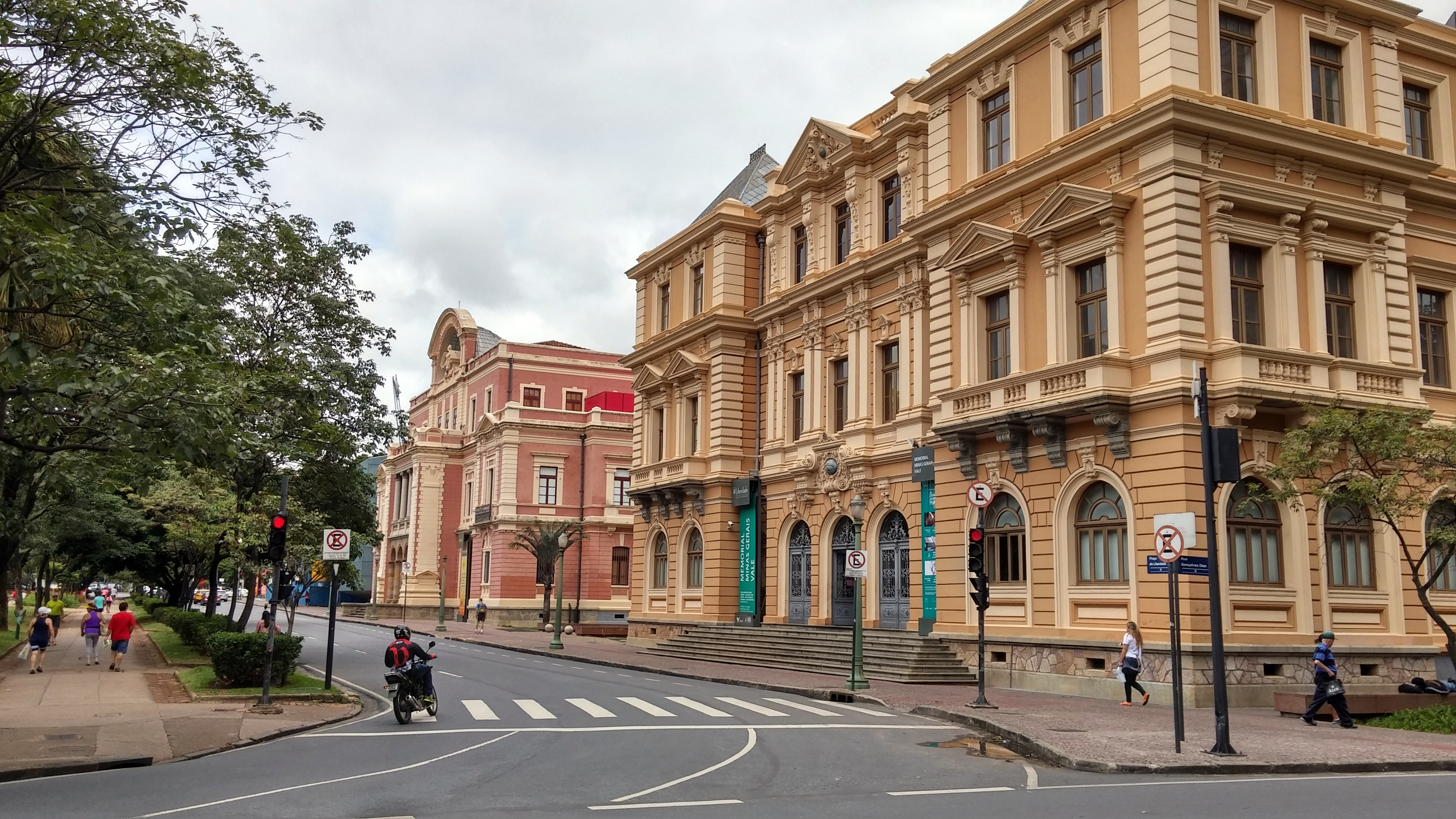
Minas Gerais Vale Memorial

The Circuito Cultural Praça da Liberdade, located in the central region of Belo Horizonte, is the largest cultural circuit in Brazil. In all, there are eleven functioning museums and cultural spaces: Arquivo Público Mineiro (Minas Gerais Public Archive), Biblioteca Pública Estadual Luiz de Bessa (Luiz de Bessa State Public Library), Cefar Liberdade, Centro de Arte Popular Cemig (Cemig Center of Popular Art), Centro Cultural Banco do Brasil (Culture Center Bank of Brazil), Espaço do Conhecimento UFMG (UFMG Knowledge Space), Horizonte Sebrae – Casa da Economia Criativa (Sebrae Horizon – The House of Creative Economy), Memorial Minas Gerais Vale (Minas Gerais Memorial), Museu das Minas e do Metal (Mines and Metal Museum), Museu Mineiro (Minas Gerais Museum) and Palácio da Liberdade (Liberty Palace). Besides these, another three spaces are already in the process of being implemented: the Casa Fiat de Cultura (Fiat Culture House), CENA and Oi Futuro. The proposal, according to the Circuit manager, Cristiana Kumaira, is to strengthen the circuit in the world cultural context. "We are already on this path and are being careful to ensure that the activities, services and assistance fulfill the needs and expectations of both the local population and the tourists who come to Belo Horizonte from around the world. The Circuit is establishing itself as one more source of pride for the people of Minas Gerais," she stresses.

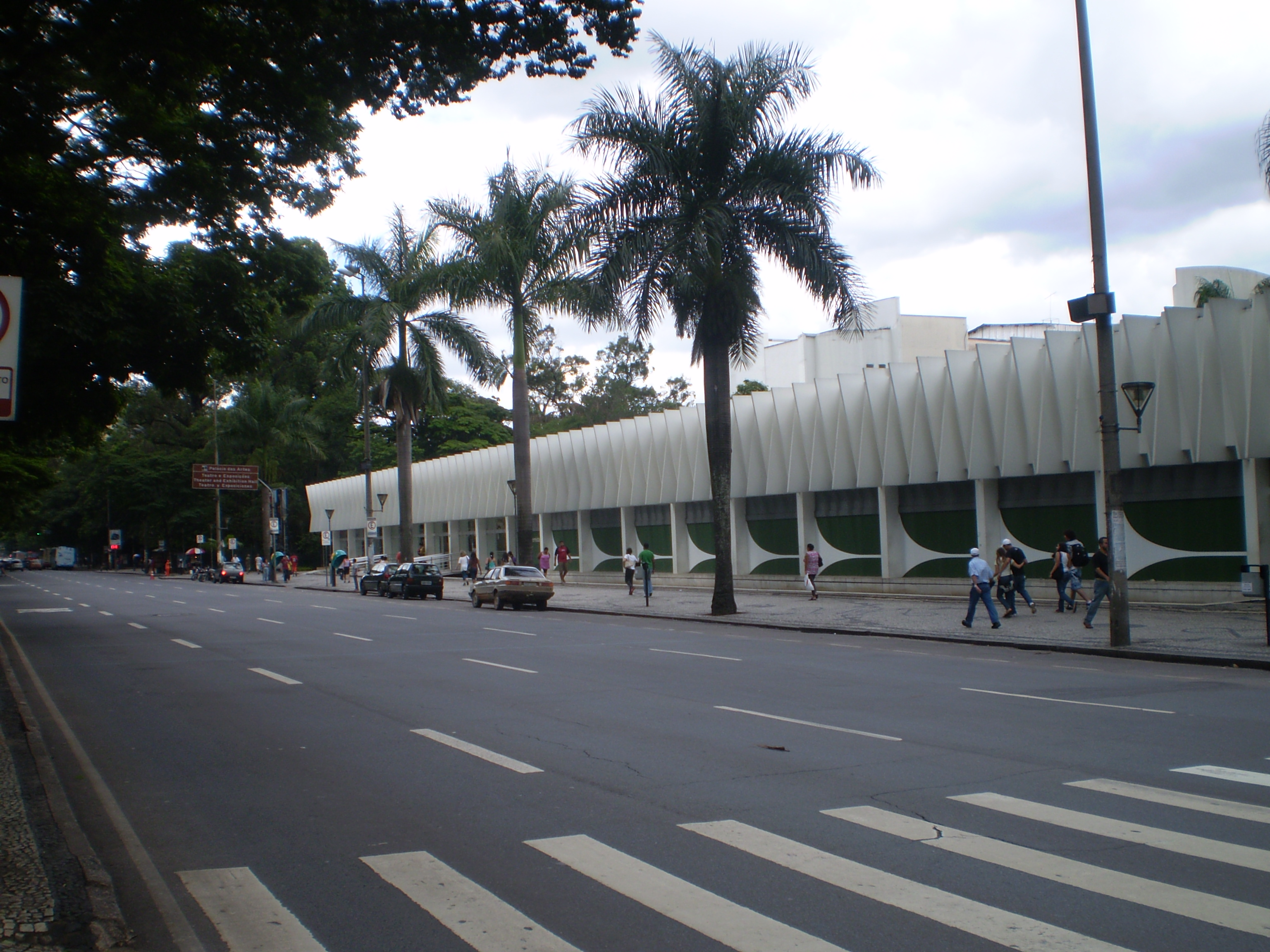
Palace of Arts Museum

Inaugurated in 2010, the Circuito Cultural Praça da Liberdade was created with the goal of exploring cultural diversity, with interactive options open to the public, in an area of great symbolic, historical and architectural value for Belo Horizonte. The opportunity came with the transference of the Minas Gerais Government headquarters to the Cidade Administrativa (Administrative City), in Serra Verde. After they had been adapted, the old department buildings opened their doors and began to house museums and cultural spaces. The Circuito Cultural Praça da Liberdade is co-managed by the Instituto Sérgio Magnani (Institute) since June 2012, through a partnership signed with the Minas Gerais Government, and the museums/spaces are mostly run by private companies, which carry out investments in heritage recovery and building maintenance. According to Kumaira, this public-private partnership model allows large companies to participate and effectively contribute to the cultural advance of the city. "Beyond their fields of activities, the partners invest in the implantation and maintenance of museums, learning spaces, exhibition halls and shows, as well as memory centers that consolidate the history of Minas Gerais, presenting it either for free or at affordable prices," she adds.

The Natural History Museum and Botanical Garden holds a notable piece of folk art, the Nativity of Pipiripau. Created during the 20th century, the craftsman Raimundo Machado, synchronized 586 figures, distributed in 45 scenes, which tell the story of life and death of Jesus, mixed with its variety of arts and crafts. With 600,000 sq. m. of green area, the UFMG Museum of Natural History and Botanic Garden (MHN-JB) is a ecological space that enables visitors to experience nature in a multidisciplinary way. For 30 years, the mission of the MHN-JB has been to do research, to educate, and to meet the community's demand for service. It covers the areas of anthropology, archeology, Environmental Education, Natural History, Mineralogy, and Paleontology. It has an Ecological Amphitheater, a Free Art atelier, a greenhouse, and an Interactive Room. One of its traditional exhibitions is the Pipiripau Nativity Crèche.

Palácio das Artes, inaugurated in 1970, comprises three theaters, three art galleries, a movie theater, a bookstore, a coffee shop and photography exhibition space. The building was designed by Oscar Niemeyer and it also houses the Minas Gerais Handcraft Center. The Pampulha Art Museum is located at the Pampulha Lake in Belo Horizonte in a building that originally housed the Pampulha Casino. The building was designed by Oscar Niemeyer, commissioned by the then-mayor and future president of Brazil Juscelino Kubitschek in the early 1940s, with external grounds by landscaper Roberto Burle Marx. The building was the first project of Oscar Niemeyer, opened as a casino, and closed in 1946. In 1957, it was re-opened as the Art Museum. His design was influenced by the principles of Le Corbusier. The gardens of Burle Marx are a tribute to the tropical green. There are three sculptures, by Ceschiatti, Zamoiski and José Pedrosa. In 1996, it won new multimedia rooms, library, café bar, a souvenir shop and technical infrastructure. The MAP has an impressive collection of 1,600 works.

=== Architecture ===
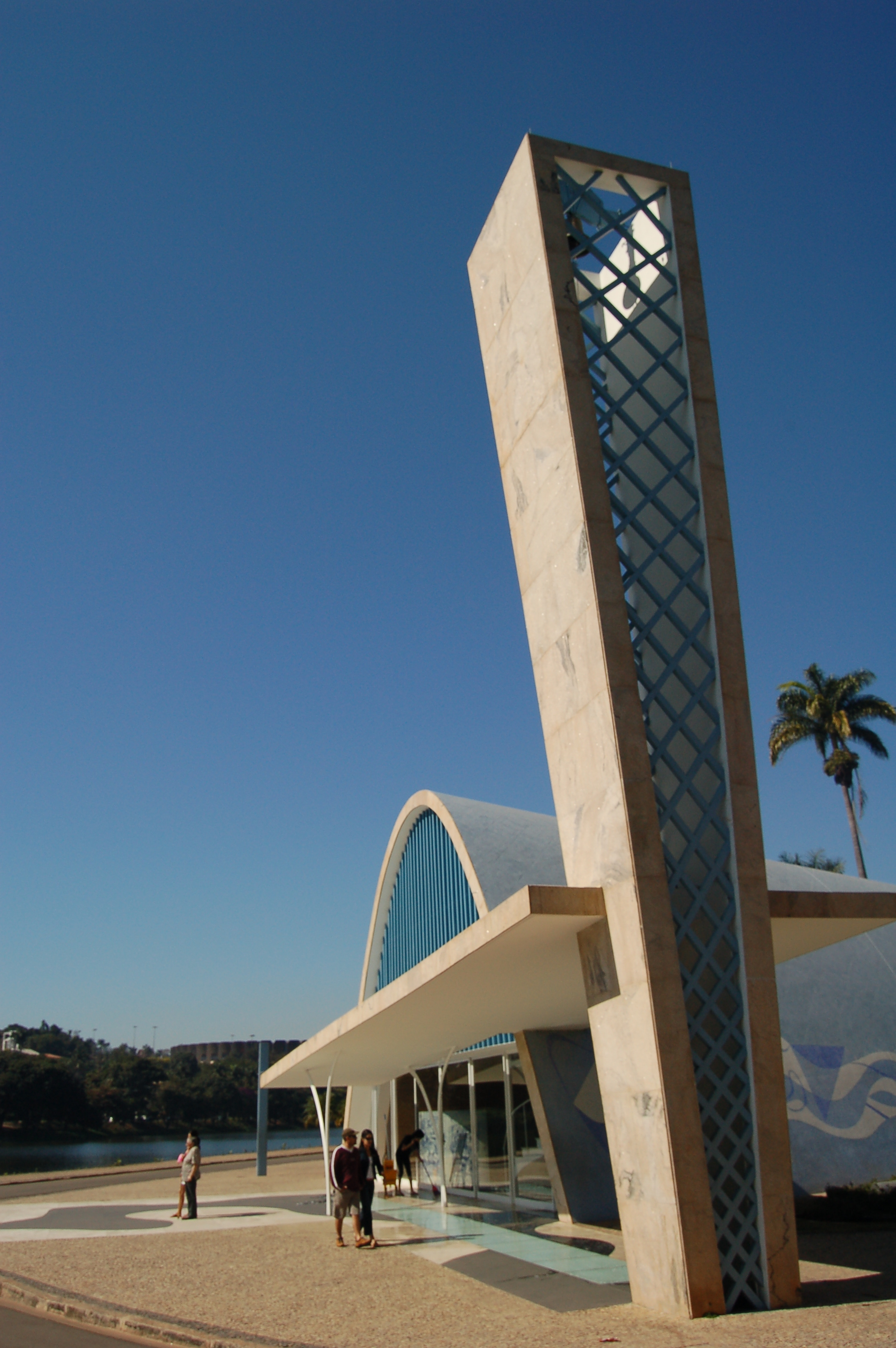
São Francisco de Assis Church in Pampulha Park

Belo Horizonte has several significant cultural landmarks, many of them situated in the Pampulha district, where there are notable examples of Brazilian contemporary architecture. Under the leadership of the then mayor of city, Juscelino Kubitschek, architects and artists such as Oscar Niemeyer, landscaper Burle Marx, and painter Candido Portinari, started a type of modern architecture and art here that was greatly developed later with the construction of Brazil's new capital, Brasília, also led by the now president Juscelino (aka JK). It is at the Pampulha complex that one can see the routes of this new architecture movement. The modern and protomodern architecture can also be seen all over Belo Horizonte, either in emblematic 1950s buildings such as Edificio Acaiaca, Conjunto JK, Hotel Amazonas and former Hotel Excelsior, all reflecting the modernity culture of the first planned capital of Brazil.

The Pampulha Park area includes one of the largest soccer stadiums in the world, the Mineirão stadium, and the São Francisco de Assis Church, widely known as Igreja da Pampulha, designed by Brazilian Modernist architect Oscar Niemeyer. In Pampulha there is also the Universidade Federal de Minas Gerais campus, whose buildings themselves are important contributions to the city's architecture. Other notable buildings include the Mesbla and Niemeyer buildings.

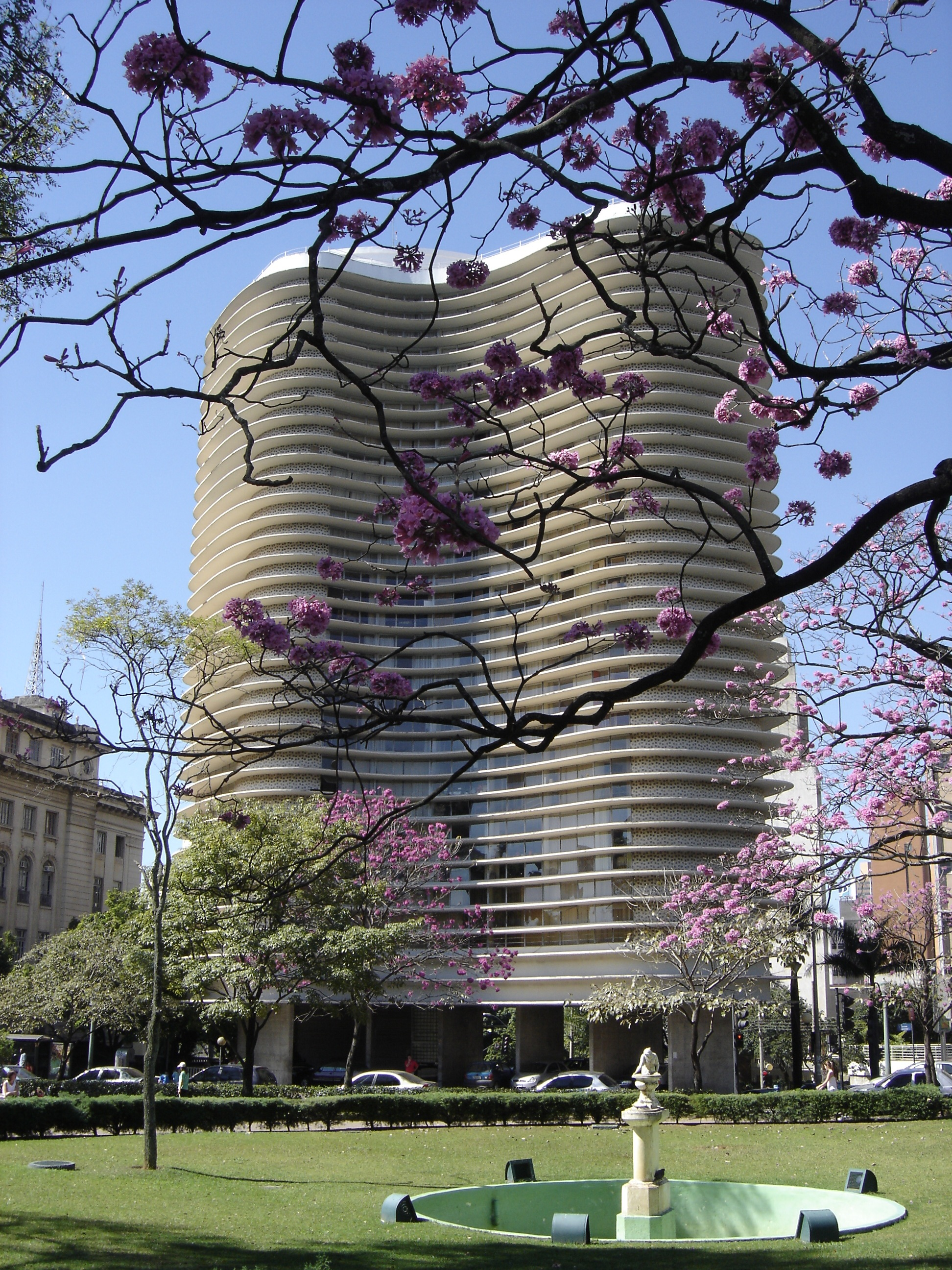
Niemeyer Building at Liberty Square

In the downtown area, landmarks include the São José Church, the Praça da Estação (Station Square), which is an old train station that now is also the Museum of Arts and Workmanship, the Municipal Park, the famous Sete de Setembro Square, where an obelisk built in 1922 marks the one hundred years of Brazilian independence from Portugal. Near Central the area, in the Lourdes neighborhood, the Lourdes Basilica, is an example of Gothic Revival style. The Nossa Senhora de Fátima Church, in Santo Agostinho neighborhood, is situated in Carlos Chagas Square. Both churches are referred to as the Assembléia Church and the Assembléia Square because of their proximity to the state's legislative assembly.

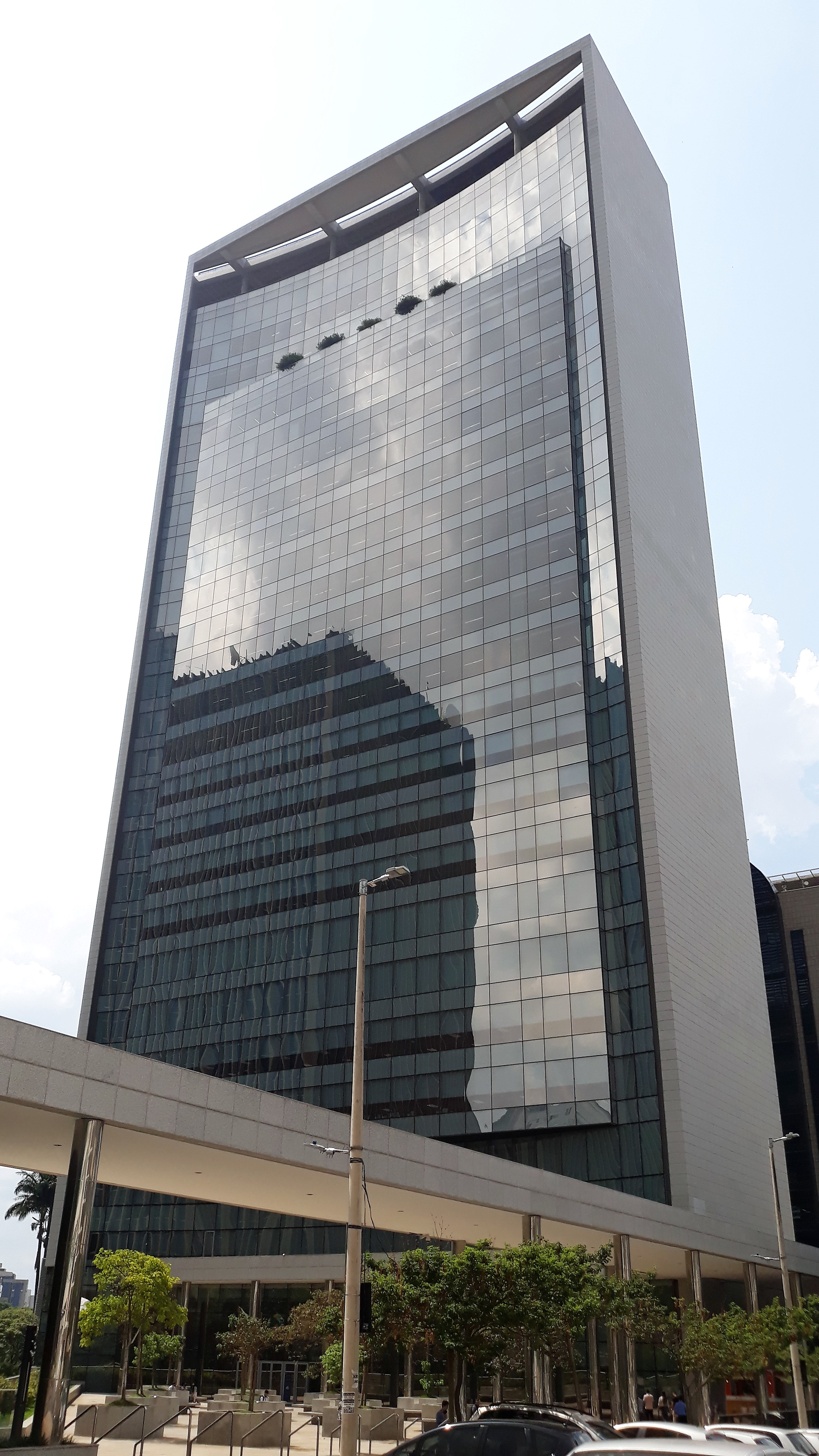
The Aureliano Chaves building, currently the tallest in Belo Horizonte.

Next to the downtown region is the Savassi district, known for fine restaurants and as a centre of cultural events as well as the best of the city's nightlife. Many landmarks are located there, such as the Praça da Liberdade (Liberty Square), and its surrounding buildings, including the former Executive Offices of the governor called the Palácio da Liberdade (Liberty Palace), the first building to be finished during the city's planned development in the late 1890s.

The government offices moved to the "Cidade Administrativa" in 2010. This complex is made by a few massive buildings just outside the city. Nowadays, the "palaces" are being turned into museums. Still on Savassi, the meeting point of many social groups, especially the youth, is "Praça da Savassi" (Savassi Square), which is not exactly a square, and more a crossing between two major avenues (Getúlio Vargas and Cristóvão Colombo), and gathers some of the busiest bars and pubs (called locally "botecos" or "botequins") in town.

Another important landmark is Praça do Papa (Pope's Square), located at a high point south of the downtown area, with its great view of the entire city. It is named for July 1, 1980, visit by John Paul II, who held a youth mass there. The nearby Parque das Mangabeiras (Mangabeiras Park) features extensive wildlife, and-owing to its considerable size-has its own bus service, which operates solely within the confines of the park. On Sundays, Afonso Pena Avenue hosts Latin America's biggest open-air market. This is the Market of Arts and Handicrafts, most commonly known as Feira Hippie (hippie fair). Every Sunday morning 70,000 visitors find food, drinks, clothes, furniture, earrings, shoes and almost anything else.

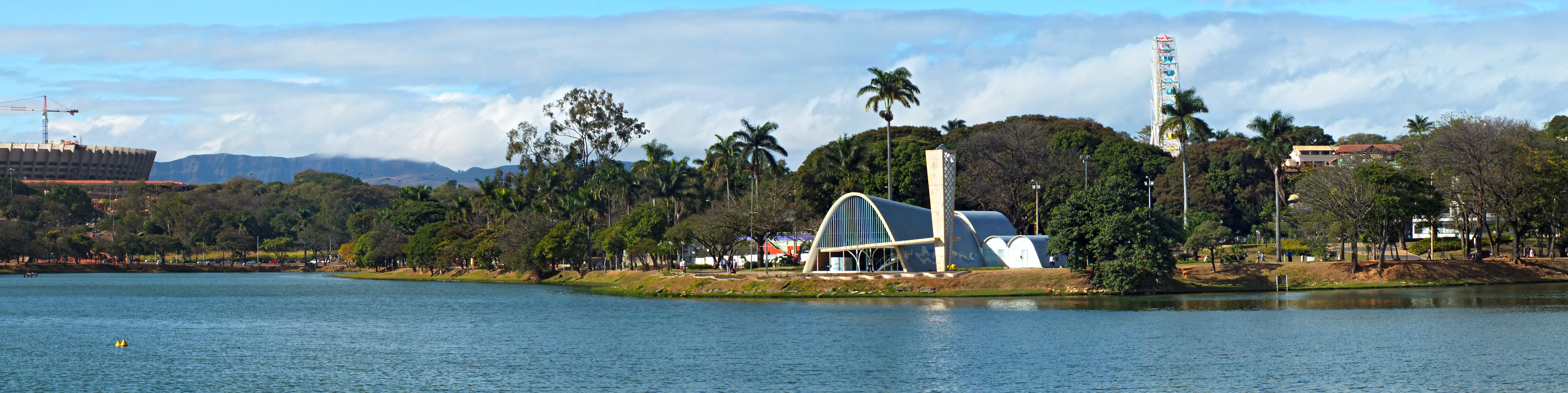
Pampulha Modern Ensemble, a UNESCO World Heritage Site.

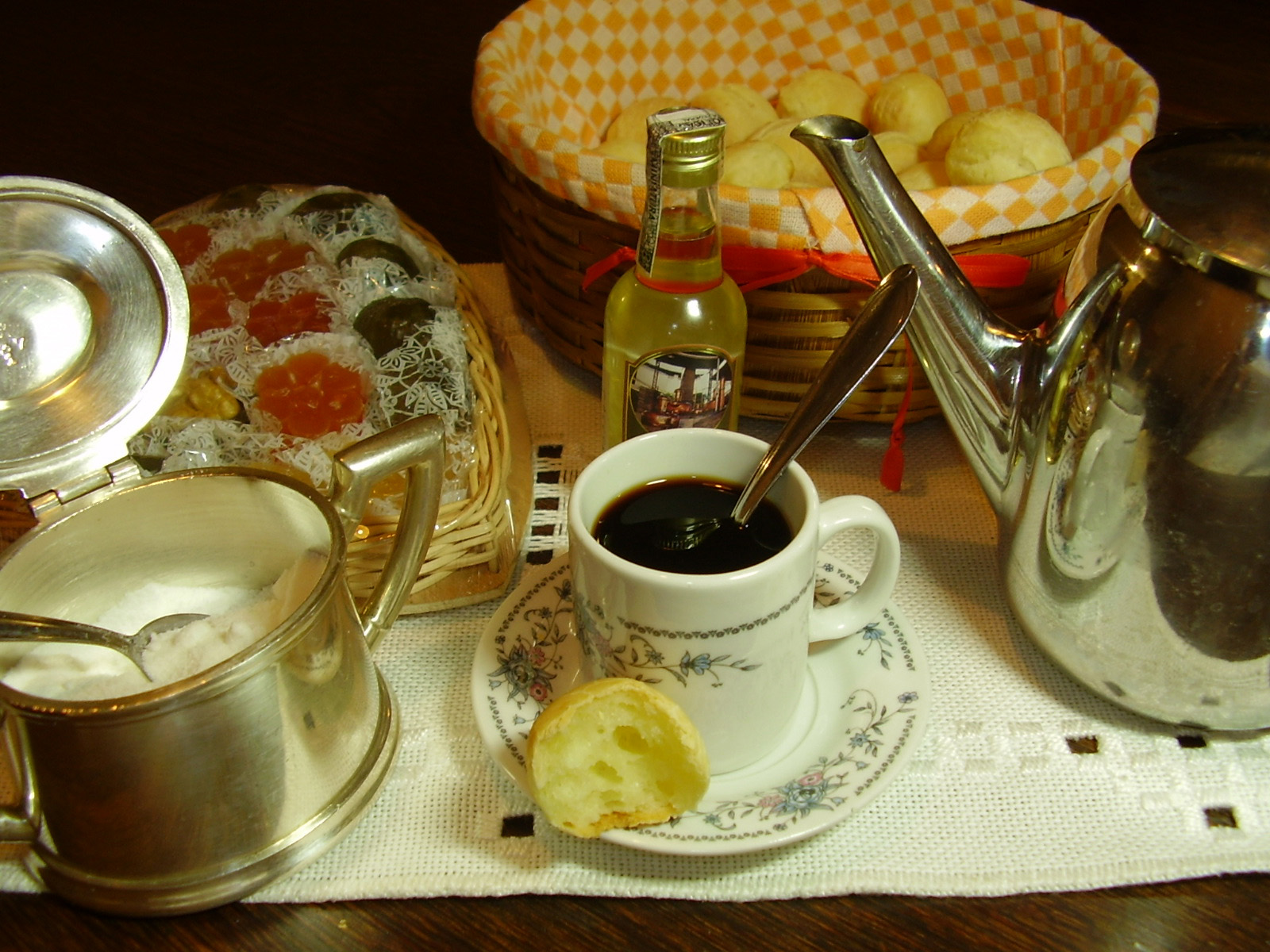
Pão de queijo with coffee is a traditional light meal of Minas Gerais

=== Food and drink ===
Belo Horizonte is internationally known as the "capital of neighborhood bars." In Belo Horizonte, local Minas Gerais cuisine and cachaça are widely consumed and popular. The neighborhoods and areas of Savassi, Lourdes, Mercado Central, Santa Tereza and Pampulha concentrate most of the city's restaurants and bars.

Every year since 1999, the city hosts the Comida di Buteco festival ("Pub Foods", in an approximate translation), in which a panel selects 41 bars to be visited, and then elects the one with the best appetizers using the theme ingredient of each year. The festival is so successful that its brand was already sold to other 21 regions in Brazil (Belém, Belo Horizonte, Brasília, Campinas, Curitiba, Florianópolis, Fortaleza, Goiás, Juiz de Fora, Manaus, Montes Claros, Poços de Caldas, Porto Alegre, Recife, Ribeirão Preto, Rio de Janeiro, Salvador, São José do Rio Preto, São Paulo, Uberlândia e Vale do Aço).

== Sport ==
=== Football ===
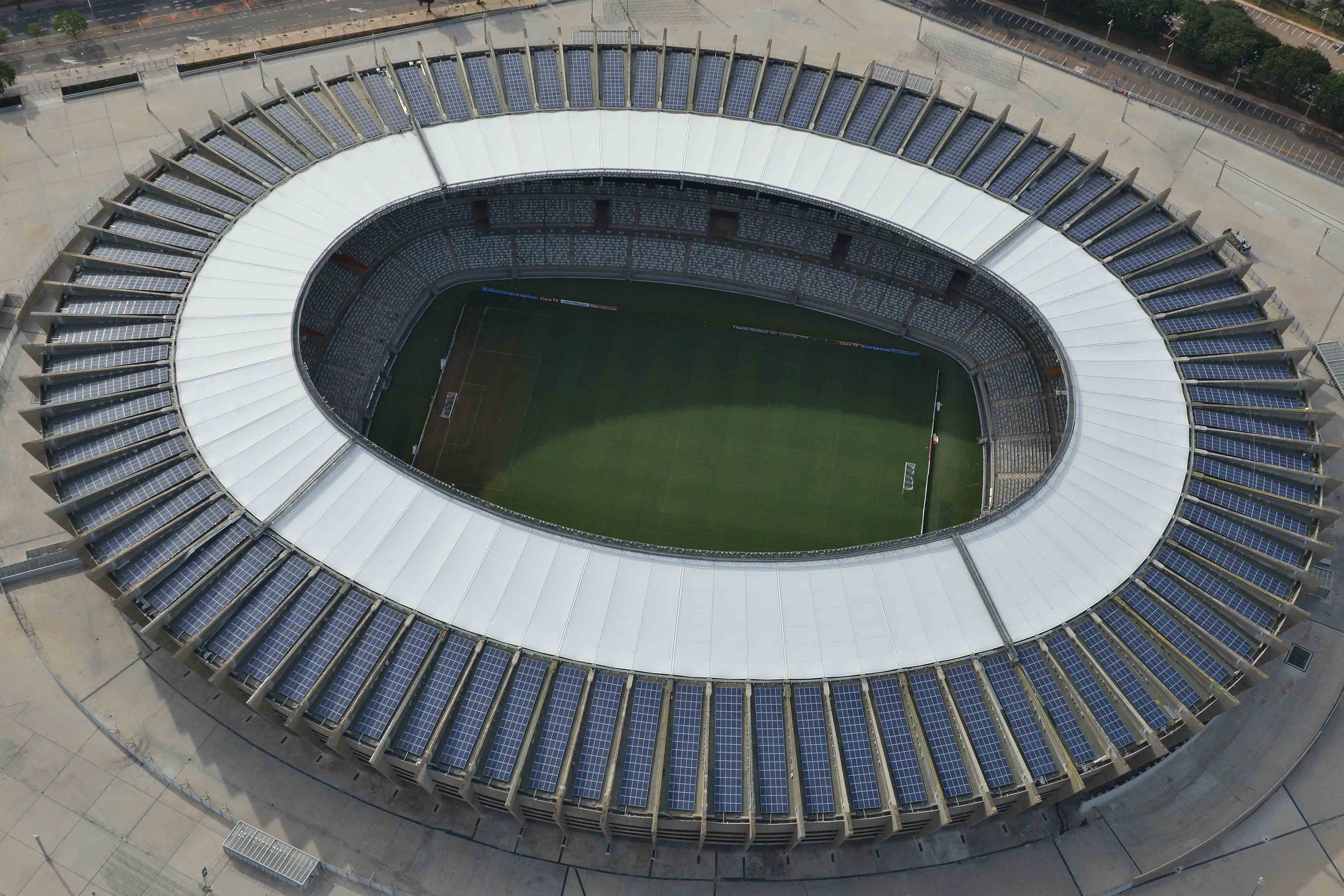
Mineirão

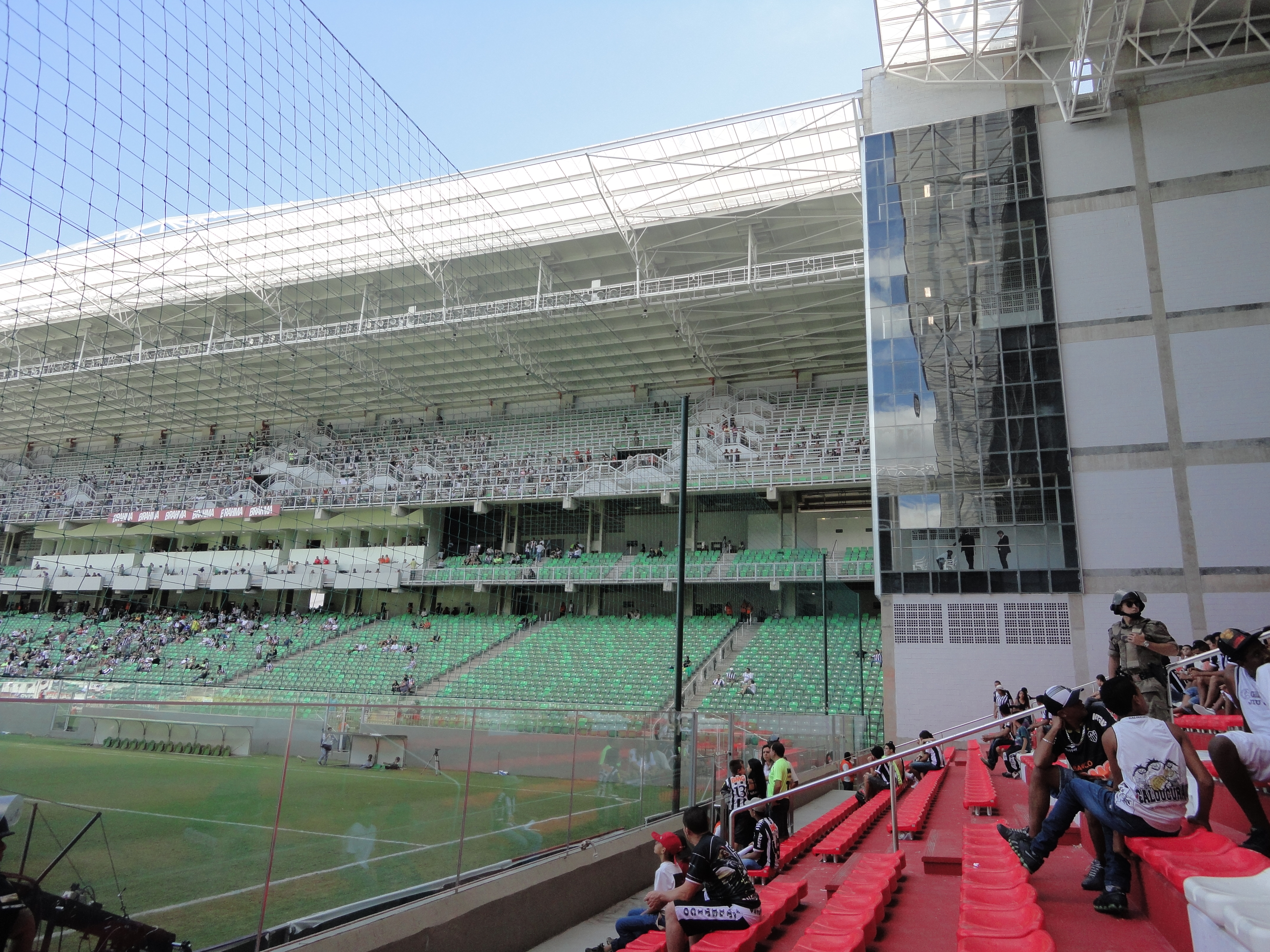
Arena Independência

As in the rest of Brazil, football is the most popular sport. The city's major teams are Atlético Mineiro, Cruzeiro and América Mineiro.

The oldest stadium in the city is the Arena Independência, built for the 1950 FIFA World Cup, and site of the so-called Miracle Match, when an amateur United States national soccer team beat heavy favourites England in an unexpected 1–0 win. It is currently the home ground of América Mineiro.

The city has one of the biggest football stadiums in the world, officially called Estádio Governador Magalhães Pinto, but widely known as Mineirão. It was built to provide the city of Belo Horizonte with a larger alternative for the Arena Independência, then the prime venue of the city. The stadium was meant to become the most modern stadium of Brazil and the new home of Atlético Mineiro and Cruzeiro. Construction took almost five years, and officially opened on September 5, 1965. Mineirão hardly changed in the following decades, and by the 1990s still had its original capacity. When Brazil won their bid to host the 2014 FIFA World Cup, it was clear that Mineirão needed to undergo a large redevelopment.

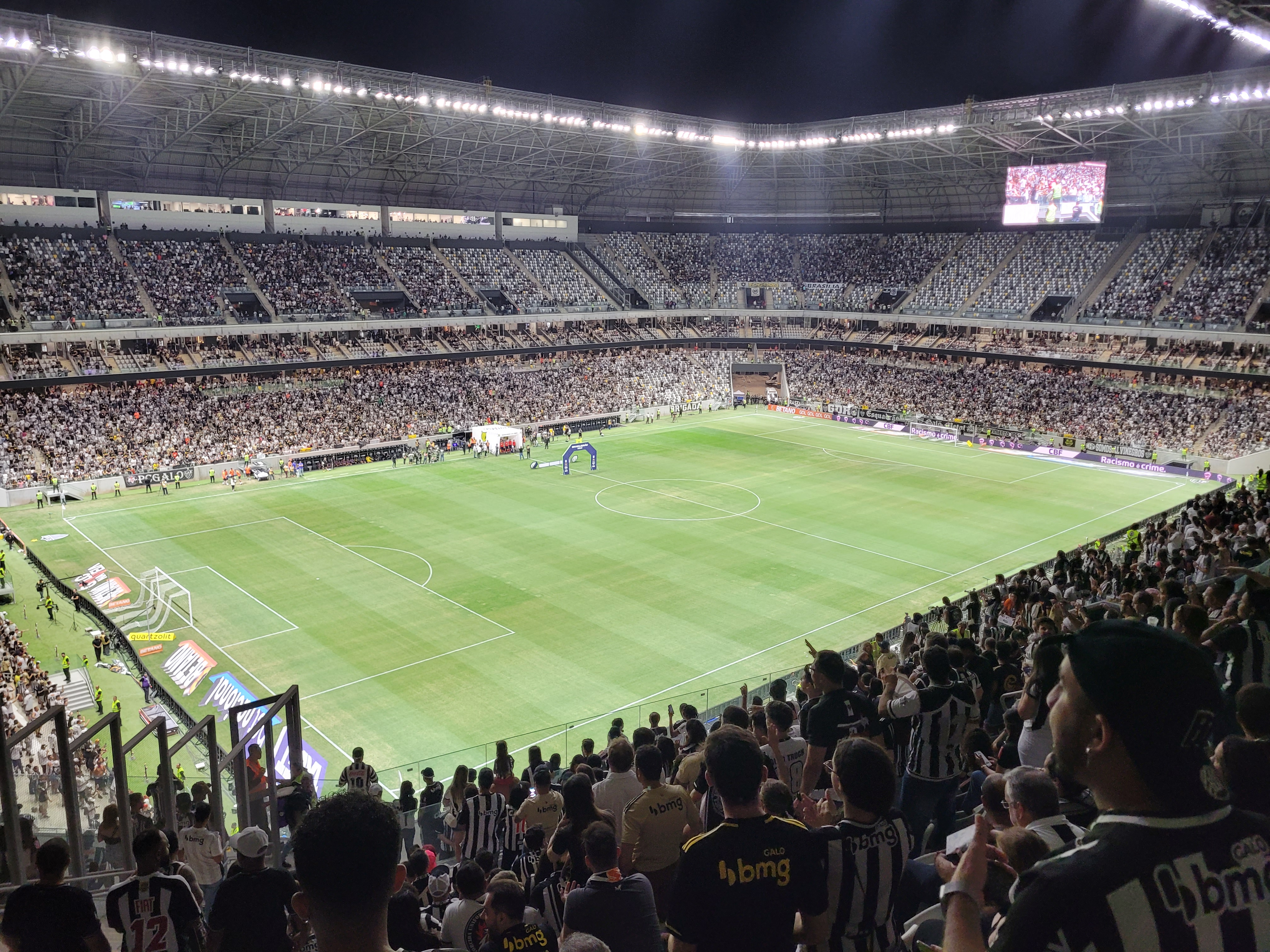
Arena MRV

The project included the complete reconstruction of the bottom tier, an extension of the roof, and further refurbishments to upgrade the stadium to FIFA standards. Building works took a total of three years and were completed in December 2012. The first match at the reopened Mineirão was played on February 3, 2013, with a state championship match between Cruzeiro and Atlético. Mineirão hosted a total of six matches during the 2014 FIFA World Cup, including the infamous Mineiraço, where Brazil lost 7-1 to Germany. The stadium also was one of the playing venues of the 2013 FIFA Confederations Cup and the Olympic football tournament in 2016.

While Cruzeiro agreed on a lease to play the next 25 years at Mineirão, Atlético decided to build its own arena in the Califórnia neighbourhood, in the northeast region of the city. The original project intended to build one of the most modern football grounds in Latin America, and the second largest sports arena in the state of Minas Gerais, with a capacity of over 46,000 people. Construction kicked off in 2017, broke ground on April 20, 2020, after delays due to the COVID-19 pandemic, and works were completed in 2023. The stadium was inaugurated on April 15, 2023, and saw its first official match on August 27, 2023, with Atlético Mineiro hosting Santos for the 2023 Campeonato Brasileiro Série A. The naming rights for the stadium were sold to Belo Horizonte-based home building and real estate company MRV, and the location became known as Arena MRV.

Football/soccer teams
| Club | League | Venue | Established (team) |
|---|---|---|---|
| Atlético Mineiro | Série A | Arena MRV 46.000 (44.048 record) | 1908 |
| Cruzeiro | Série A | Mineirão 61.846 (132,834 record) | 1921 |
| América Mineiro | Série B | Arena Independência 23,018 (32,721 record) | 1912 |

In addition to football, Belo Horizonte has one of the largest attendances at volleyball matches in the entire country. They are played either at Mineirinho, home of Brazil's national volleyball team, or at Minas Tênis Clube.

=== Other sports ===
Belo Horizonte is home to 2015 French Open men's doubles champion and former World no. 1 doubles player Marcelo Melo as well as 2016 Australian Open men's doubles and mixed doubles champion Bruno Soares.

The Minas Tênis Clube is a multi-sport club that plays in the Novo Basquete Brasil, Liga Nacional de Futsal, Brazilian Men's Volleyball Superliga and Brazilian Women's Volleyball Superliga.

== Consular representations ==
The following countries have consular representations in Belo Horizonte:

- Argentina (Consulate)
- Canada (Consulate)
- Italy (Consulate-General)
- Portugal (Consulate)
- United Kingdom (Consulate)
- United States (Embassy Branch Office)
- Uruguay (Consulate)
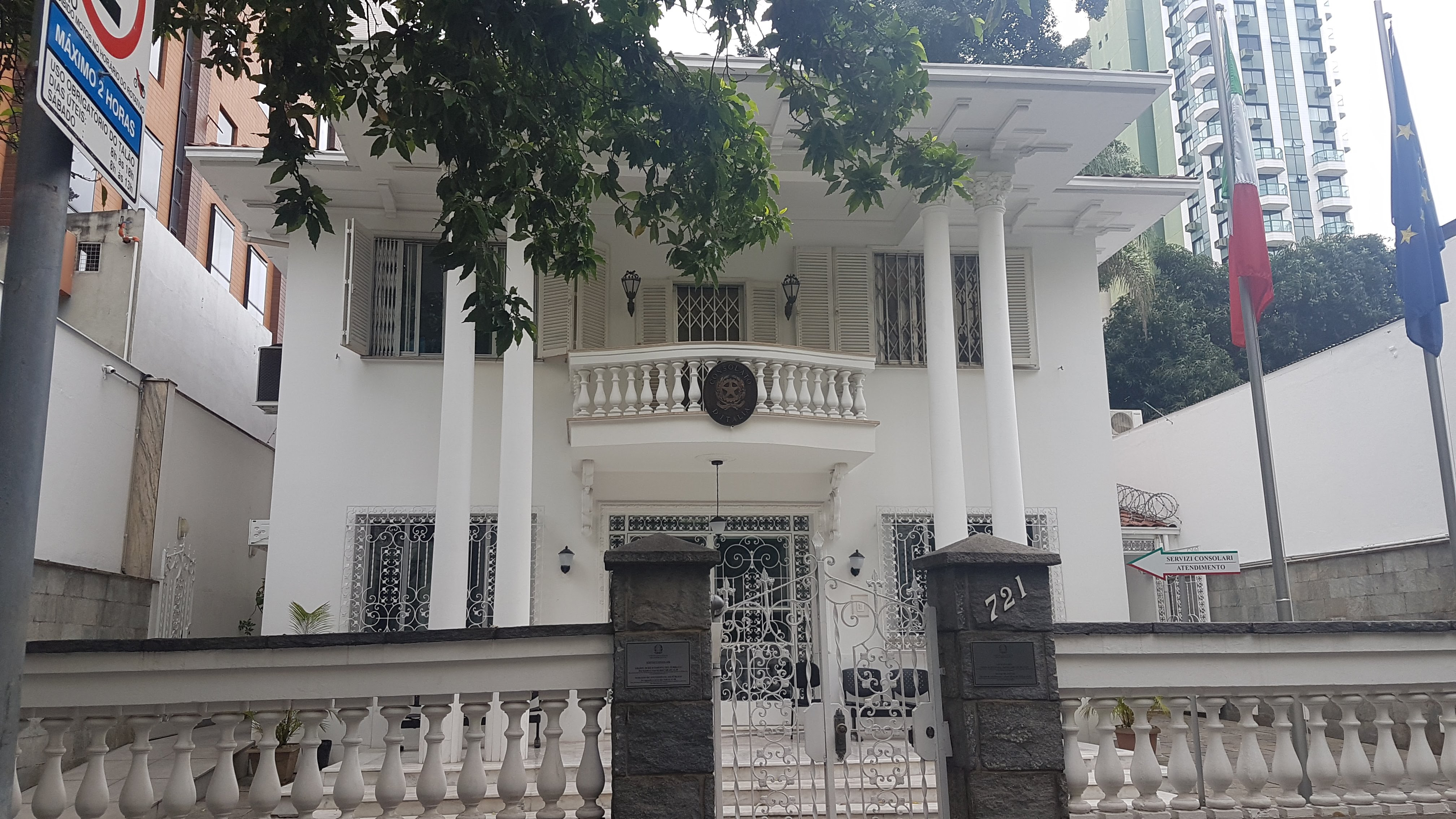
Consulate-General of Italy

== International relations ==
Belo Horizonte's sister-city agreements provide a framework for cultural, educational, economic and social cooperation. The city's partnership with Fort Lauderdale, Florida, established in 2003, is commemorated by Parque Fort Lauderdale, an environmental area adjoining the Serra do Curral.

Municipal legislation recognizes the following sister cities:

- Austin, United States (1965–1991)
- Luanda, Angola (1968)
- Zahlé, Lebanon (1974)
- Granada, Spain (1975)
- Porto, Portugal (1986)
- Minsk, Belarus (1987)
- Bethlehem, Palestine (1999)
- Homs, Syria (2001)
- Masaya, Nicaragua (2002)
- Fort Lauderdale, United States (2003)
- Tripoli, Libya (2003)
- Cuenca, Ecuador (2004)
- Tegucigalpa, Honduras (2004)
- Newark, United States (2006)
- Lagos, Nigeria (2011)
- Lisbon, Portugal (2024)
- Haifa, Israel (2024) (Note: The enacted municipal law spells the name as "Naifa", although the legislative record identifies the intended city as Haifa.)
- Pleiku, Vietnam (2024)

== Notable people ==
- Wilson Teixeira Beraldo (1917–1998), physician and physiologist, discoverer of bradykinin
- Joana Fomm
- Cristiano da Matta (born 1973), former racing driver and 2002 CART FedEx Championship Series Champion
- Daiana Menezes
- Dilma Rousseff
- Fernando Sabino
- Rafael L. Silva
- Ricardo Viana Vargas (born 1972), engineer

== See also ==
- Municipal Salon of Fine Arts of Belo Horizonte
