= Our Lady of Good Voyage Church =

Topics referred to by the same term

Our Lady of Good Voyage Church may refer to:

- Our Lady of Good Voyage Church, Belo Horizonte, an active Catholic parish church and former cathedral in Belo Horizonte, Minas Gerais, Brazil
- Our Lady of Good Voyage Church (Gloucester, Massachusetts), a Catholic church in Gloucester, Massachusetts, United States
- Our Lady of Good Voyage (Boston), a Catholic shrine and church in Boston, Massachusetts, United States

== See also ==
- Our Lady of Good Voyage, a title of the Virgin Mary
