= Our Lady of Good Voyage =

Marian title and Catholic devotion

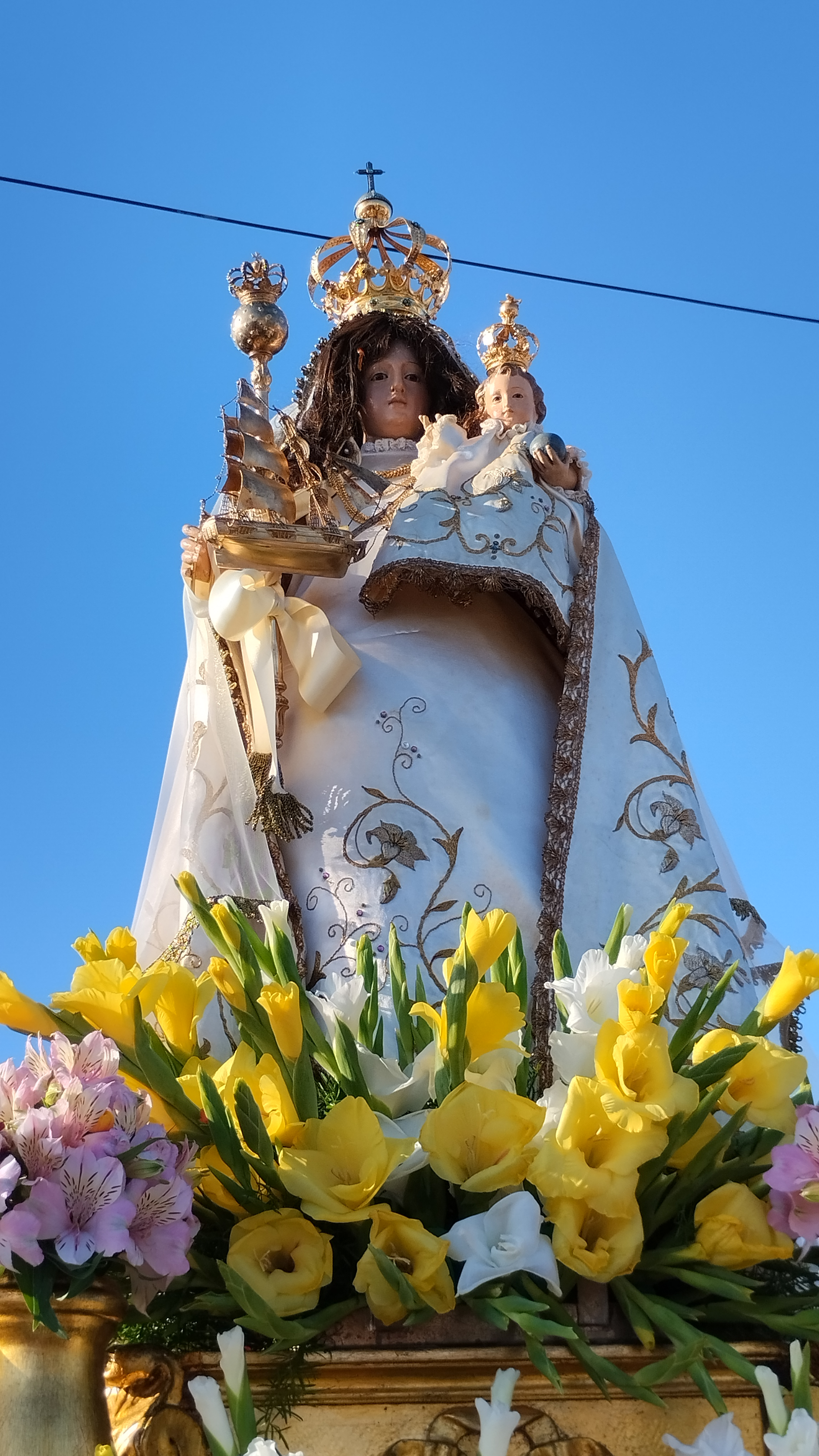
- Typical representation Our Lady of Good Voyage, holding the Christ Child and a ship.

Marian title
- Venerated in: Catholic Church
- Feast: Varies by locality; 15 August in Belo Horizonte
- Attributes: Mary holding the Christ Child and a ship or small boat
- Patronage: Travelers; seafarers; fishermen; river workers; Belo Horizonte

Our Lady of Good Voyage (Portuguese: Nossa Senhora da Boa Viagem) is a Marian title and Catholic devotion to Mary as protector of travelers. The Portuguese title is also a wish for a safe journey, and its usual English form preserves the older maritime phrase "Good Voyage".

The devotion developed in Portuguese-speaking Catholic communities where travel often meant crossing the sea, working on rivers, or moving through long inland routes. In Portugal and New England, sailors, fishermen, river workers and their families prayed to Our Lady of Good Voyage for a safe return. In Brazil, the devotion spread through coastal towns and into the colonial interior, where tropeiros, cattle drovers and peddlers in Minas Gerais also invoked her protection.

Images of Our Lady of Good Voyage usually show Mary holding the Christ Child and a ship or small boat. Churches, shrines and local festivals dedicated to the title are found in Portugal, Brazil and Portuguese diaspora communities. In Brazil, Our Lady of Good Voyage is venerated as the patroness of Belo Horizonte, the capital of Minas Gerais.

== Name and meaning ==
The Portuguese title Nossa Senhora da Boa Viagem is usually rendered in English as Our Lady of Good Voyage. Nossa Senhora means "Our Lady", a common Catholic title for Mary. (Note: In Portuguese Catholic usage, Nossa Senhora literally means "Our Lady" and is used in Marian titles such as Nossa Senhora de Fátima and Nossa Senhora Aparecida.) Boa viagem is the everyday Portuguese farewell for someone setting out on a trip, close in sense to "have a good journey" or "safe travels". (Note: Boa viagem is the Portuguese expression used to wish someone a good journey. The word viagem can mean a journey, a route traveled, or, in nautical use, a crossing.)

In Catholic devotion, the phrase becomes a prayer for safe passage. Mary is invoked under this title by people leaving home, crossing the sea, working on rivers, fishing offshore, or traveling through the interior. The English form "Good Voyage" keeps the older seafaring phrase and remains the standard English name used by Catholic shrines and churches dedicated to this title in Massachusetts.

== History ==
The devotion to Our Lady of Good Voyage comes from the Catholic practice of praying for protection before a journey. In Portugal, sailors, fishermen and river communities turned to the title before travel on open water and busy river routes. Portuguese seafarers and migrants carried the devotion across the Atlantic, and in Brazil it entered Catholic life in coastal towns, river settlements and the mining interior.

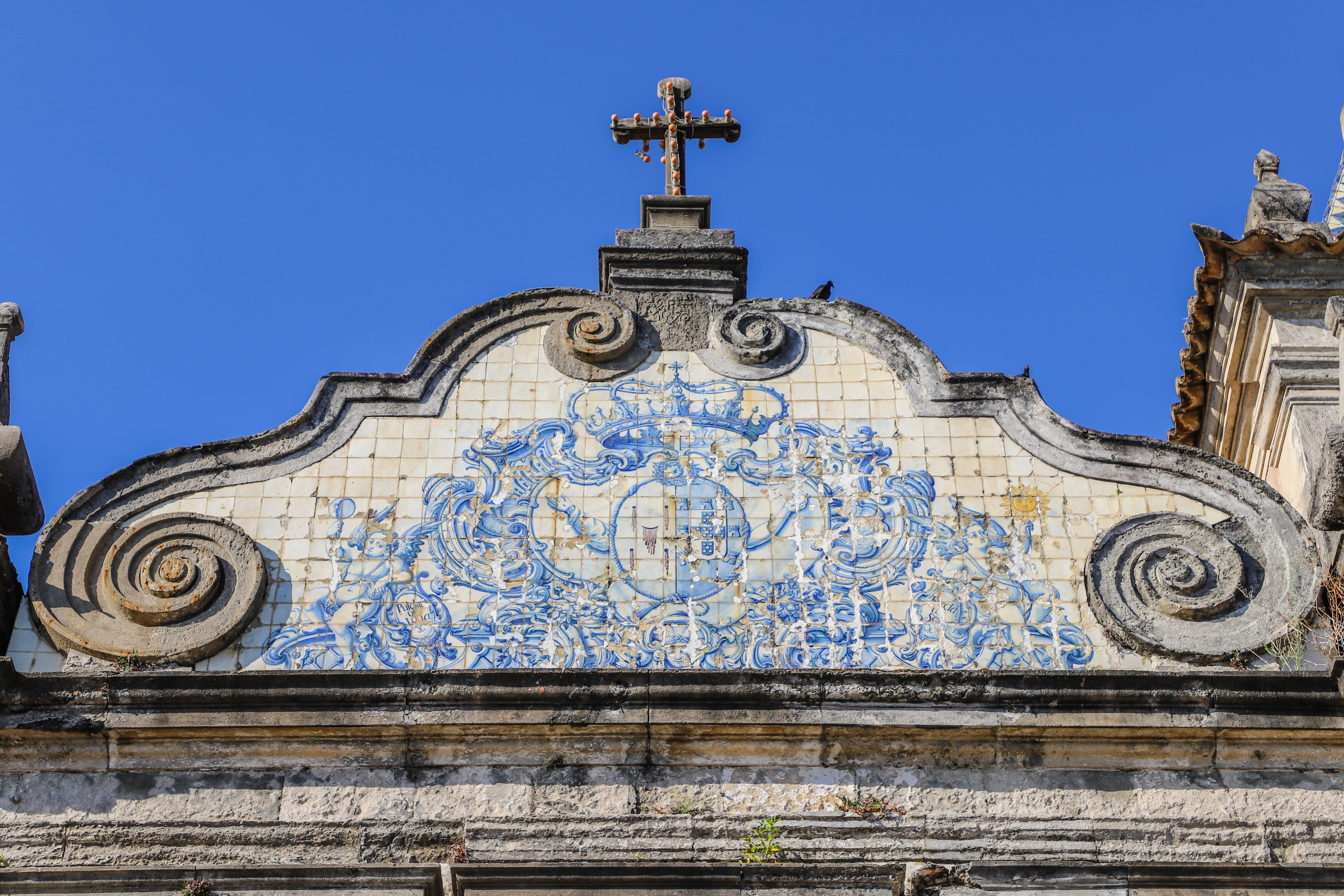
Pediment of the Church and Hospice of Nossa Senhora da Boa Viagem in Salvador, Bahia, Brazil, one of the older Brazilian sites dedicated to the title.

In Brazil, churches dedicated to Nossa Senhora da Boa Viagem developed in several regions. In Recife, Balthazar da Costa Passos and Ana de Araújo Costa donated land to Father Leandro Camelo on 6 June 1707 for a religious foundation near the shore, an early step in the history of the Church of Nossa Senhora da Boa Viagem. In Salvador, the Church and Hospice of Nossa Senhora da Boa Viagem were built on land donated to the Franciscans in 1710; the church and hospice were completed in 1743.

The devotion reached the mining region of Minas Gerais during the early eighteenth century. In Itabirito, Francisco Homem Del Rey and Luiz de Figueiredo Monterroyo reached the area in the first years of the gold rush. A wooden retable from the Nau de Nossa Senhora da Boa Viagem (Note: Nau is a Portuguese word for a large sailing ship or carrack. In this context it refers to a vessel named Nossa Senhora da Boa Viagem.) was brought inland after the ship was abandoned in Paraty, and an early hermitage dedicated to Our Lady of Good Voyage stood where the later parish church was built.

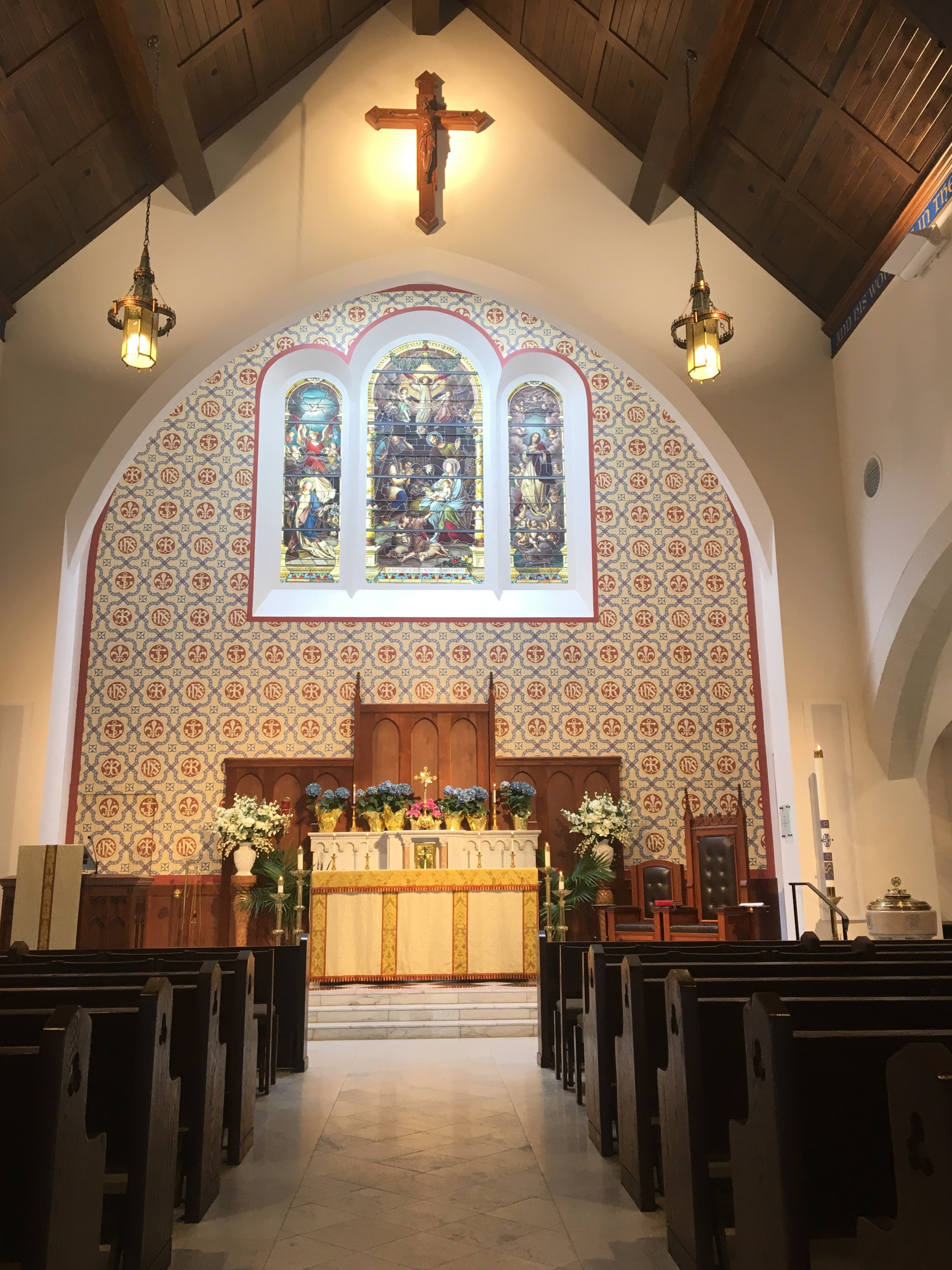
Sanctuary of Our Lady of Good Voyage Shrine in Boston, with Mary shown holding the Christ Child and a ship.

In the area that later became Belo Horizonte, the devotion began in the old settlement of Curral del Rey. In 1709, Francisco Homem del Rey settled in the region under a royal land grant, or carta de sesmaria, (Note: A carta de sesmaria was a Portuguese royal land grant, used in colonial Brazil to assign land for settlement and cultivation.) and brought with him an image of Our Lady of Good Voyage that had crossed the Atlantic. A small wattle and daub chapel was built to house the image along a route used by tropeiros, (Note: Tropeiros were muleteers and cattle or pack-animal drivers who carried goods through the interior of Brazil before modern roads and railways.) and travelers moving through the interior came to pray there.

The parish of Nossa Senhora da Boa Viagem in Curral del Rey was created in the first half of the eighteenth century and later became a permanent royal-supported parish by decree of 16 January 1752. When Curral del Rey was chosen in the late nineteenth century as the site of the new capital of Minas Gerais, several colonial buildings were demolished for the planned city. The old parish church of Nossa Senhora da Boa Viagem was preserved for a time, then replaced by a new neo-Gothic church whose foundation stone was blessed in 1911. The church was inaugurated in 1923 and became the first cathedral of Belo Horizonte.

In 1977 the state heritage institute of Minas Gerais protected the church, surrounding square, as well as the image of Our Lady of Good Voyage, liturgical objects, three retables from the old parish church, and two bells that survived from the earlier building. The cathedral title was transferred in 2021 to Christ the King Cathedral, and the old church continued as an archdiocesan shrine.

In the United States, the devotion became part of Portuguese Catholic life in New England fishing communities. The first American church dedicated to Our Lady of Good Voyage was established in Gloucester, Massachusetts, in the late nineteenth century for Portuguese families connected with the fishing industry. In Boston, Cardinal Richard Cushing established a seaport chapel in 1952 for fishermen, dockworkers and others who worked at sea. The present Our Lady of Good Voyage Shrine was dedicated in 2017 in the city's Seaport District.

== Iconography ==
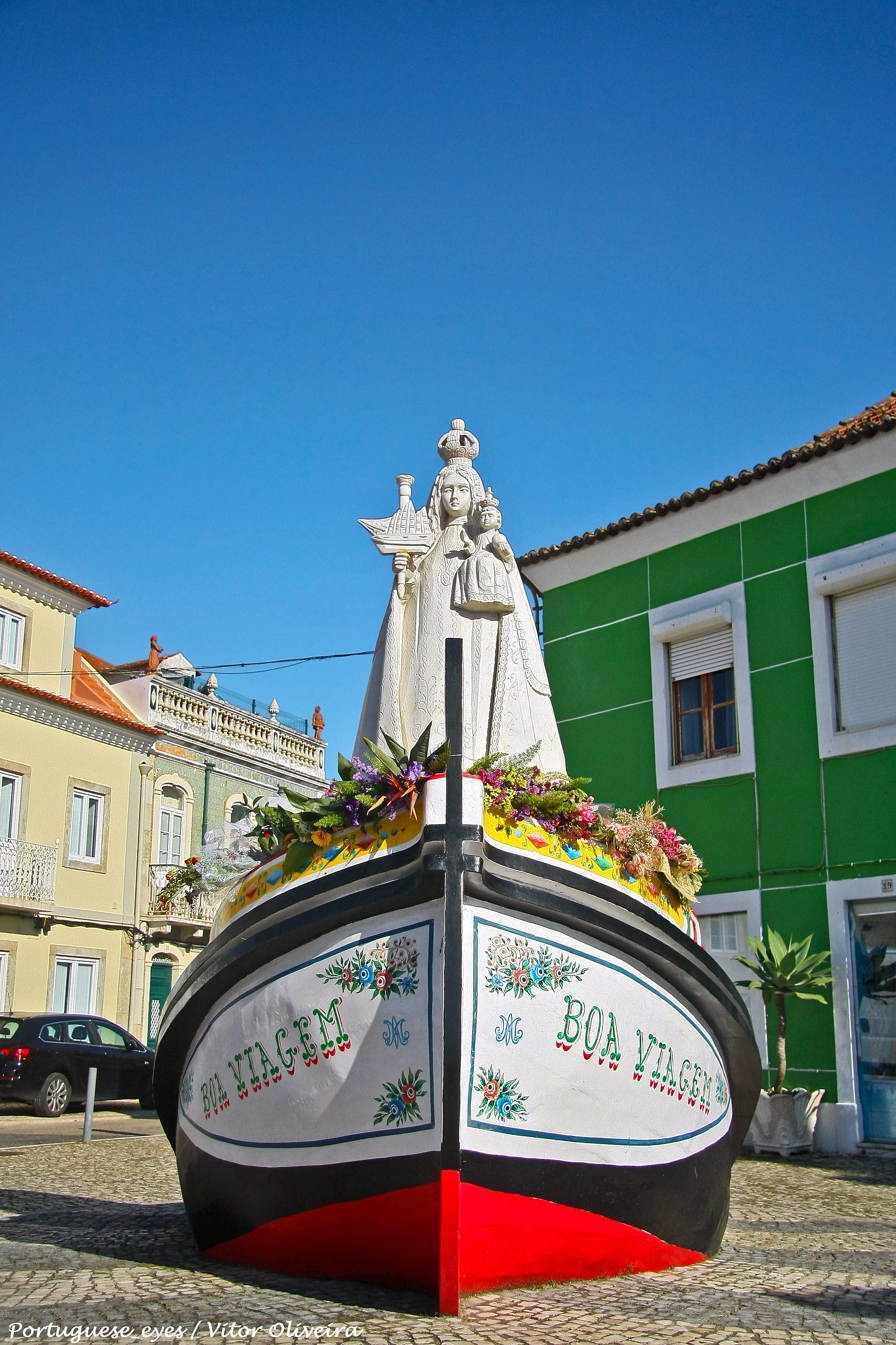
Monument to Our Lady of Good Voyage in Moita, Portugal.

Images of Our Lady of Good Voyage usually show Mary with the Christ Child and a ship, fishing boat, or small sailing vessel. The boat links the image to safe journeys by sea, river, road and trail.

In Ericeira, Portugal, the eighteenth-century image venerated in the chapel shows Mary with the Christ Child in one hand and the fishermen's boat in the other. The boat is linked to the fishermen of the town and to the old Christian image of the Church as a boat.

In Belo Horizonte, the image of Nossa Senhora da Boa Viagem also shows Mary carrying the Christ Child and holding a boat. The vessel is linked with the journey of Francisco Homem del Rey, whose tradition belongs to the early settlement that preceded the city.

At Our Lady of Good Voyage Shrine in Boston, the nautical theme continues inside the building. The shrine's interior was designed around the image of a spiritual voyage, and its stained glass includes Our Lady of Good Voyage beside Saint Peter, the fisherman apostle.

== Patronage ==
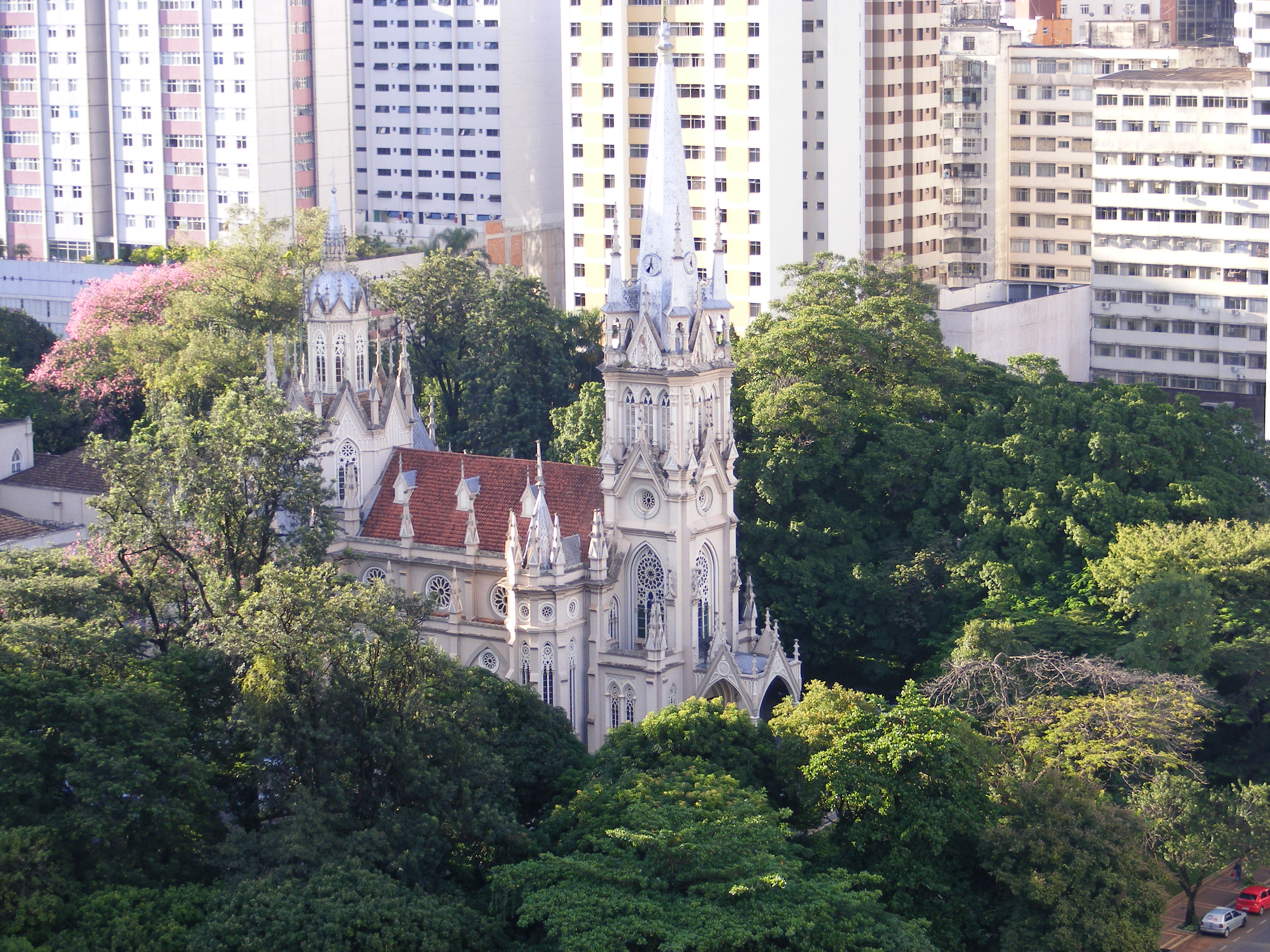
Our Lady of Good Voyage is the patroness of Belo Horizonte. This is a view of the city's former cathedral, now a shrine.

Our Lady of Good Voyage is invoked by people facing the risks of travel and work away from home. In Portugal and in Portuguese maritime communities abroad, sailors, fishermen, river workers and their families pray to her for a safe return. In inland Brazil, especially in Minas Gerais, travelers who crossed the colonial interior by road and trail also prayed under this title.

Fishing communities are among the title's best-known centers of devotion. At the Massachusetts shrines dedicated to Our Lady of Good Voyage, Portuguese families prayed for the safe return of fishermen and others working at sea. The patronage also belongs to river towns. In Moita, Our Lady of Good Voyage is the patroness of the town, and local devotion is bound to the traditional boats of the Tagus. In Constância, the devotion grew from river travel and trade with Lisbon.

In Belo Horizonte, Our Lady of Good Voyage is venerated as patroness of the city. The title has belonged to the capital of Minas Gerais since 1932 and was later formalized by Pope Pius XII at the request of Cardinal Carlos Carmelo de Vasconcellos Motta. The local devotion began in the old settlement of Curral del Rey, where an early chapel sheltered an image of Our Lady of Good Voyage brought from Portugal.

== Feasts and celebrations ==
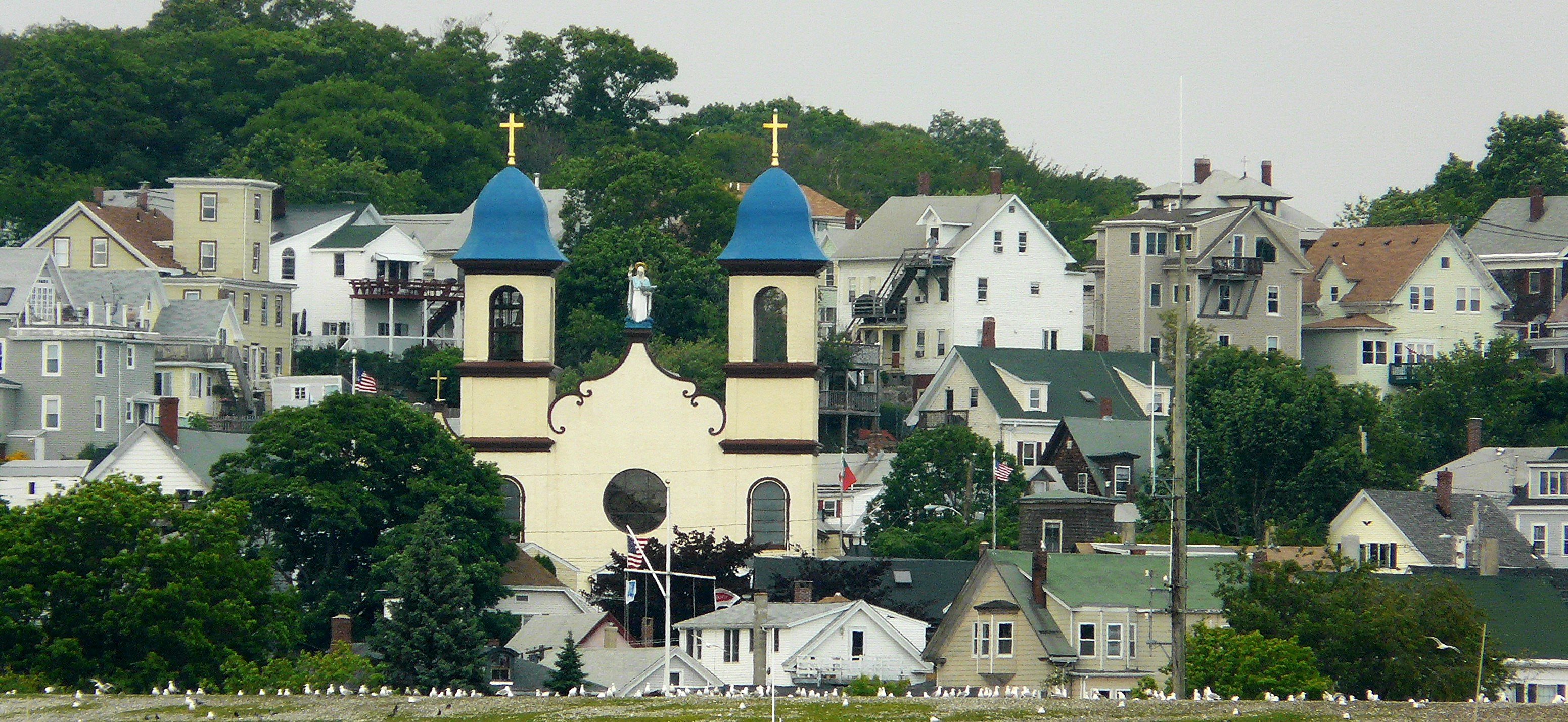
Our Lady of Good Voyage Church in Gloucester, Massachusetts, a center of the devotion among Portuguese-American fishing families.

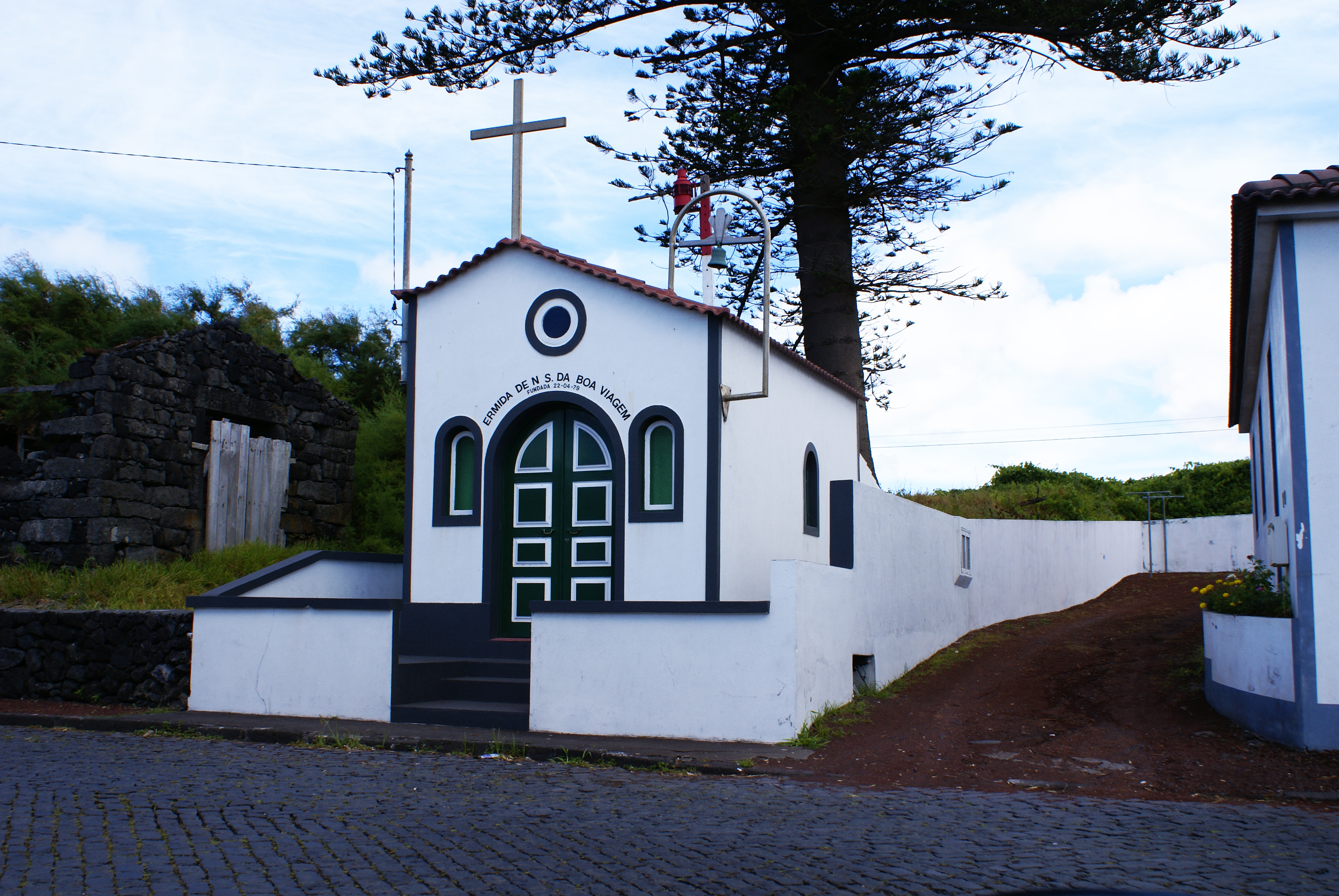
Hermitage of Our Lady of Good Voyage in Criação Velha, Pico Island, Azores.

Celebrations of Our Lady of Good Voyage vary from place to place. In coastal and river towns, they often include processions and the blessing of boats. In Belo Horizonte, the patronal feast centers on novenas, Masses, processions, cultural events and gatherings around the old church square.

In Belo Horizonte, the main celebration runs from 6 to 15 August and ends on the local feast day of the city's patroness. The program includes novenas, daily Masses, prayers of the rosary, a quermesse, (Note: A quermesse is a parish fair, often held with food stalls, games, music and fundraising activities around a church celebration.) artistic and cultural presentations, and the Caminhada com Maria, (Note: Caminhada com Maria means "Walk with Mary"; in Belo Horizonte it is a devotional walk or pilgrimage connected with churches in the archdiocese dedicated to Mary.) a devotional walk linked to Marian churches in the archdiocese. The closing day includes the Procissão Luminosa, (Note: Procissão Luminosa means "Luminous Procession" or "Procession of Lights"; the name refers to the nighttime procession in which worshippers carry lights through the city center.) a nighttime procession through the central area of Belo Horizonte. The procession leaves Praça Rio Branco, follows Afonso Pena Avenue, and ends at the shrine with an outdoor Mass.

In Ericeira, Portugal, the annual celebration traditionally takes place on the third Sunday of August. The present form of the festivities began in 1947, after an interruption between 1912 and 1929, and the feast centers on a maritime procession linked to the town's fishing life.

In Moita, Portugal, the September festivities in honor of Our Lady of Good Voyage last ten days and include religious ceremonies, civic events and popular celebrations. The festival's main religious act is the solemn procession through the town, followed by the blessing of the traditional boats of the Tagus. The program also includes music, sports, activities with traditional Tagus river craft, and local bull-running and bullfighting events. A regatta of traditional Tagus boats is held as part of the festivities. The boat contest and procession were already part of the local celebration in 1971, when they were filmed for the television archive of Rádio e Televisão de Portugal.

In Constância, Portugal, the Festa de Nossa Senhora da Boa Viagem is held around Easter Monday. The celebration includes Mass, a procession in honor of Our Lady of Good Voyage, the blessing of boats on the Tagus and Zêzere rivers, and the blessing of vehicles in Praça Alexandre Herculano.

== Places of devotion ==
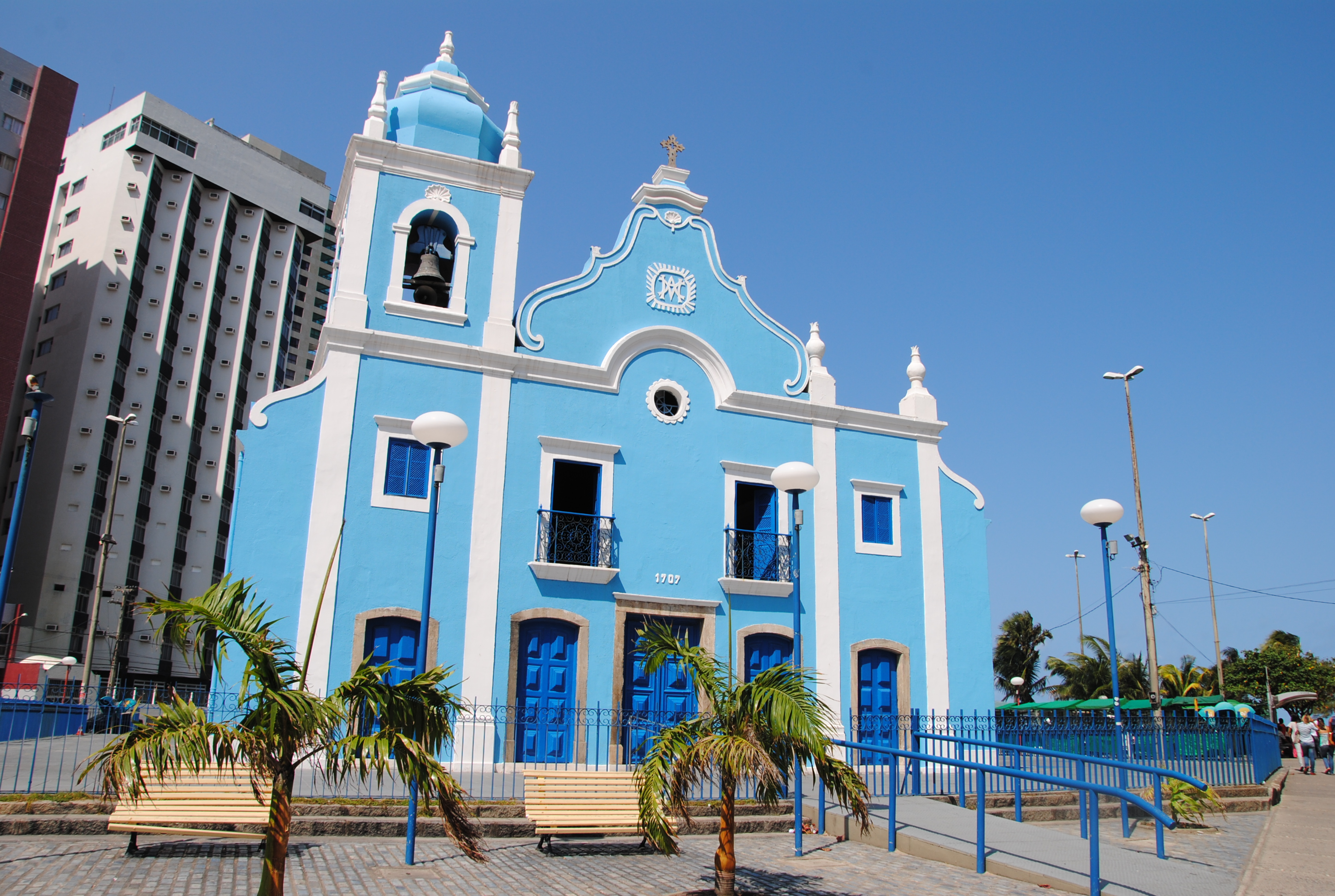
Church of Nossa Senhora da Boa Viagem in Recife, Pernambuco, Brazil

Churches, chapels and shrines dedicated to Our Lady of Good Voyage are found in Portugal, Brazil and Portuguese diaspora communities. Many stand near the sea, along rivers, or beside older routes of travel.

=== Portugal ===
In Portugal, the devotion is found in maritime and river towns such as Ericeira, Moita and Constância. In Ericeira, the chapel of Nossa Senhora da Boa Viagem belongs to the town's fishing life. In Moita and Constância, the devotion remains close to the Tagus and to ceremonies with traditional river craft.

=== Brazil ===
In Brazil, churches dedicated to Nossa Senhora da Boa Viagem developed in coastal cities and in the interior. Older sites include the Church of Nossa Senhora da Boa Viagem in Recife, the Church and Hospice of Nossa Senhora da Boa Viagem in Salvador, and the parish tradition of Itabirito in Minas Gerais. In Belo Horizonte, the former cathedral of Nossa Senhora da Boa Viagem remains an archdiocesan shrine and a local center of the devotion.

=== United States ===
In the United States, the devotion became part of Portuguese Catholic life in New England fishing communities. The first American church dedicated to Our Lady of Good Voyage opened in Gloucester, Massachusetts, in the late nineteenth century. The Our Lady of Good Voyage Shrine continues the devotion in Boston's Seaport District.

== See also ==
- Boa Viagem
- Titles of Mary, mother of Jesus
- Our Lady of Navigators
- Our Lady of Good Voyage Church (Gloucester, Massachusetts)
- Our Lady of Good Voyage (Boston)
- Our Lady of Good Voyage Cathedral, Belo Horizonte
