= Esplanada, Belo Horizonte =

Esplanada is a neighborhood (bairro) of Belo Horizonte. The population of the neighborhood is estimated at 8,800 residents. The neighborhood still retains characteristics of the towns of the interior, even though it is located near the central region of the state capital.
