= São José Church =

Catholic shrine in central Belo Horizonte, Minas Gerais

São José Archdiocesan Sanctuary
- São José Church
- Santuário Arquidiocesano São José
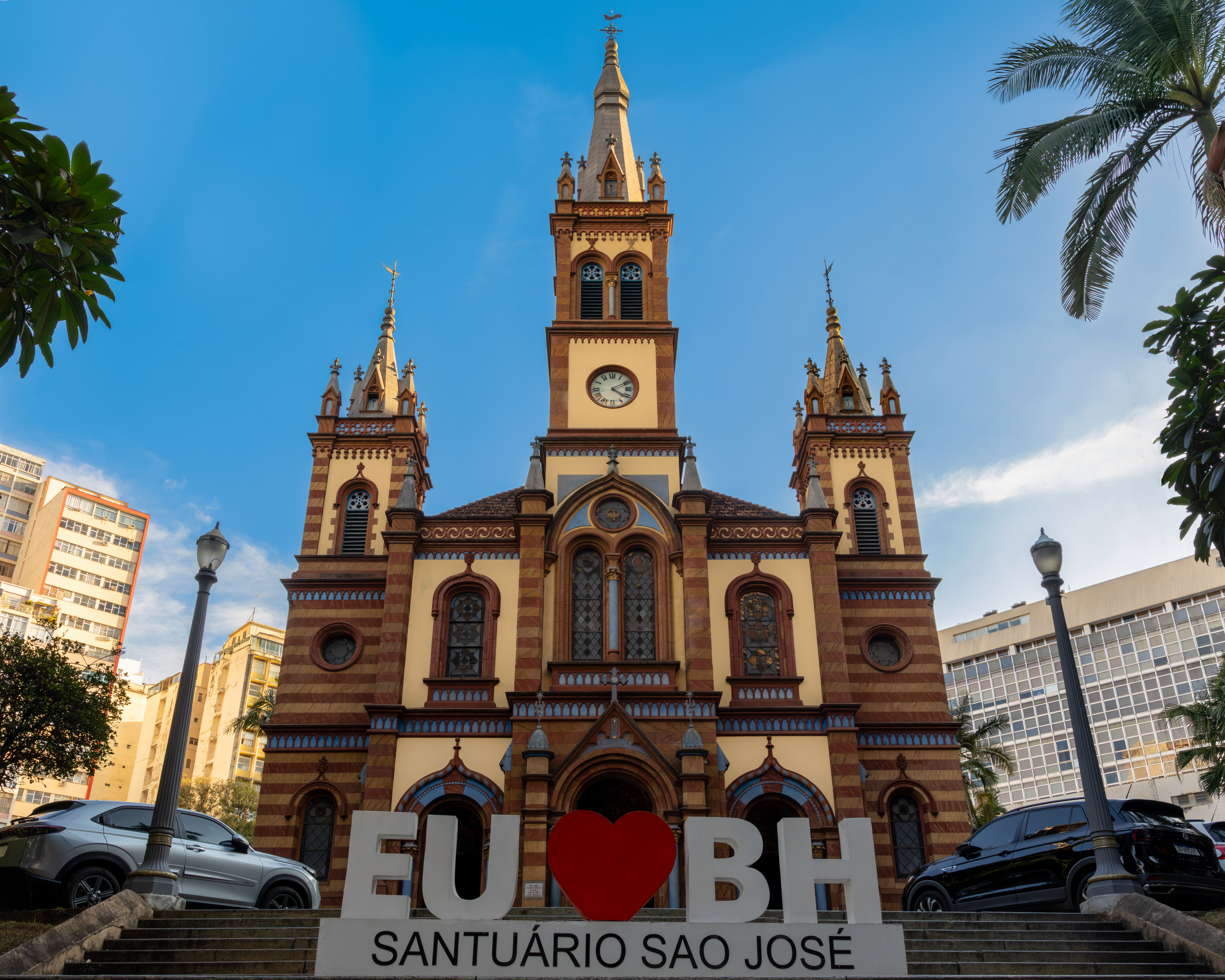
- Main façade of the sanctuary, facing Afonso Pena Avenue
- São José Archdiocesan Sanctuary
- 19°55′16″S 43°56′19″W
- Location: Centro, Belo Horizonte, Minas Gerais
- Address: Rua dos Tupis, 164
- Country: Brazil
- Denomination: Catholic Church
- Website: www.santuariosaojosebh.com.br

History
- Status: Archdiocesan shrine; parish church
- Founded: 27 January 1900 (parish)
- Dedication: Saint Joseph
- Events: Elevated to an archdiocesan shrine on 19 March 2021

Architecture
- Functional status: Active
- Heritage designation: Municipal heritage property
- Designated: 1990
- Architect: Edgard Nascentes Coelho
- Architectural type: Basilica-plan church
- Style: Eclectic, with Neo-Manueline forms
- Years built: 1902–1910
- Groundbreaking: 20 April 1902
- Completed: 1910

Specifications
- Length: 60 m (200 ft)
- Width: 19 m (62 ft)

Administration
- Archdiocese: Archdiocese of Belo Horizonte
- Parish: São José

The São José Archdiocesan Sanctuary (Note: In the Catholic Church, a shrine is a church given special status because it welcomes particular devotions or pilgrimages. "Archdiocesan" means that the designation was granted within the archdiocese.), commonly known as São José Church, is a Catholic church built in an eclectic style, with references to Gothic Revival and Neo-Manueline architecture. (Note: Eclectic architecture combines elements drawn from different styles and periods. Gothic Revival architecture returns to forms used in the medieval Gothic period, while Neo-Manueline architecture revives elements associated with early 16th-century Portugal.) It is in the Centro neighborhood of Belo Horizonte, Minas Gerais. The church occupies elevated ground bounded by Tamoios, Espírito Santo, Tupis, and Rio de Janeiro streets, with its main façade facing Afonso Pena Avenue. It is the seat of São José Parish, (Note: A parish is the Catholic community assigned to a particular area and entrusted to a parish priest. The parish church is the principal church of that community.) which was established on 27 January 1900 and entrusted to the Redemptorists.

Construction of the parish church began in 1902. Services started being held in the building on 19 March 1904, and construction was completed in 1910. The design was prepared by engineer Edgard Nascentes Coelho. Construction was initially directed by Dutch Redemptorist brother Gregório Mulders (Note: Within a religious congregation, "brother" does not indicate a family relationship. It refers to a member who has taken religious vows but has generally not been ordained as a priest.) and was completed by Verenfrido Vogels, who was also responsible for the monumental stairways.

The church has a Latin cross plan and a basilica layout with three naves. (Note: In a Latin-cross plan, the long body of the church is crossed by a shorter transverse arm, forming the shape of a cross. In a basilica layout, the central nave is accompanied by lower side aisles.) It measures 60 m (200 ft) long and 19 m (62 ft) wide. Its exterior combines eclectic and Neo-Manueline forms. Between 1911 and 1912, Guilherme Schumacher covered much of the interior with paintings of biblical episodes, saints, plant ornament, and celestial groupings.

The church was placed under municipal heritage protection in 1990. (Note: In Brazil, heritage listing, known as tombamento, protects a property of cultural value and restricts changes that could alter its character. The property does not become government-owned.) The architectural and landscaped ensemble formed by the church, convent, gardens, and other buildings on the block was listed by the municipality on 10 November 1994. On 19 March 2021, the parish church received the title of archdiocesan shrine. Its formal installation took place on 29 June of that year.

== History ==
=== Establishment of the parish and arrival of the Redemptorists ===
Belo Horizonte was inaugurated as the capital of Minas Gerais in December 1897. In January 1900, the city had approximately 14,000 inhabitants and only one parish. Silvério Gomes Pimenta, bishop of the then Diocese of Mariana, invited Dutch Redemptorist missionaries to begin pastoral work in the new capital.

Fathers Pedro Beks and Francisco Lohmeyer arrived in Belo Horizonte on 23 January 1900. Three days later, they were joined by Father Afonso Matysen and brothers Felipe Winter and Doroteu Van Lent. São José Parish was established on 27 January as the city's second parish, with Pedro Beks as its first parish priest. The group began its ministry at the Chapel of the Rosary on 28 January and later held parish services at the Chapel of Saint Anthony, at the corner of Tamoios and São Paulo streets.

The church was built on high ground where it could be seen across the still-forming capital. The Redemptorists sought to strengthen catechesis, organize parish work, and bring Catholics closer to the directives of Rome. (Note: Ultramontanism was a Catholic movement that called for greater obedience to the pope and to decisions made by the Church in Rome.)

=== Construction of the church and convent ===
Pedro Beks chose a hill facing Afonso Pena Avenue, between Tamoios and Espírito Santo streets, as the site of the new parish church. The position placed the building above the surrounding streets and allowed it to be approached from the avenue by a frontal stairway.

The foundation stone was laid on 20 April 1902. Construction of the convent began the following day on the side of the block facing Rua dos Tupis. The Redemptorist community moved into the new residence on 9 December 1902, although construction had not yet been completed.

The church was designed by Edgard Nascentes Coelho, an engineer employed by the municipal administration. Gregório Mulders directed construction until he was transferred to Rio de Janeiro in 1904. Verenfrido Vogels then took charge of the work and remained responsible for it until 1910. Vogels also designed the stairways and approaches connecting the church forecourt (Note: The forecourt, known in Portuguese as an adro, is the open area in front of or around a church, generally adjoining its steps and main entrance.) to Afonso Pena Avenue.

The first service in the building was held on 19 March 1904, the feast day of Saint Joseph. Although the church was still unfinished, it began to be used as the parish church. The main structure and stairway were completed in 1910. Interior painting occupied the following two years.

The convent retained its exposed brickwork and wooden window and door frames. The block came to contain the church, the Redemptorist convent, parish house, parish hall, gardens, and smaller buildings used for parish activities.

=== Provisional cathedral ===
The Diocese of Belo Horizonte was established in 1921. Because construction of Our Lady of Good Voyage Church had not yet been completed, the new diocese's first bishop, Antônio dos Santos Cabral, was received at São José Church and temporarily installed his cathedra there. (Note: The cathedra is the bishop's ceremonial chair. A church that houses it is called a cathedral, which is why São José temporarily functioned as the principal church of the new diocese.) The church held this role for approximately two years.

In 1922, the Redemptorists offered the church and episcopal residence to the diocese on the condition that the bishop purchase the complex and provide the congregation with another site. Cabral did not pursue the arrangement, partly because of the purchase cost. The episcopal seat was later transferred to Our Lady of Good Voyage Church.

=== Elevation to a shrine ===
Archbishop Walmor Oliveira de Azevedo granted the parish church the title of São José Archdiocesan Sanctuary on 19 March 2021, during a Mass held on the patron saint's feast day. The decision was made during the Year of Saint Joseph proclaimed by Pope Francis and as part of the centennial commemorations of the creation of the Diocese of Belo Horizonte.

The formal installation was celebrated on 29 June 2021, during commemorations of the 70th anniversary of the former Rio de Janeiro Redemptorist Province, an administrative division that brought together communities of the congregation. The parish remained under Redemptorist administration.

== Architecture ==
=== Site and exterior ===
The sanctuary occupies the center of a sloping city block. Its main façade faces Afonso Pena Avenue, while the convent and parish buildings are entered from Rua dos Tupis. Gardens and internal paths separate the church from the neighboring structures.

The slope led to the construction of a monumental stairway on the central axis of the façade, accompanied by side ramps that follow the hillside. From higher points in central Belo Horizonte, the outline formed by the church, stairway, and side approaches resembles a chalice.

The building belongs to the eclectic architectural repertoire used during Belo Horizonte's early years. Its ornamentation has been classified as Neo-Manueline, with elements introduced by its Dutch Redemptorist builders. The façade has a central clock tower flanked by two smaller towers. Arches, pinnacles, geometric friezes, and bands of contrasting colors run across the walls and frame the doors and windows.

The central tower projects from the main body of the façade and emphasizes the axis of the principal entrance. The side towers have louvered openings and tall spires. (Note: A spire is a tall, pointed roof placed at the top of a tower.) Smaller towers, pinnacles, and crosses also rise above the side volumes and roofline.

The exterior walls received painted ornament by Guilherme Schumacher. In 1928, these surfaces were covered with a uniform layer of beige paint. Restoration of the original colors began decades later, following paint investigations conducted during conservation planning. (Note: During restoration work, paint investigations use small test areas to find older colors, paintings, or materials hidden beneath more recent layers.)

=== Stylistic classification ===
São José Church belongs to the eclectic architecture of Belo Horizonte's early years. The building has also been classified as Neo-Manueline with Dutch influences and as eclectic with Gothic Revival references. Pointed towers, pinnacles, arches, contrasting bands of color, and geometric and plant ornament coexist within the same design.

This mixture caused debate even while the church was being built. Gregório Mulders wanted to alter Edgard Nascentes Coelho's design but was unable to do so. A Redemptorist text cited by historian João Teixeira de Araújo criticized the wide columns, vaults, and "strange mixture of several styles", while praising the building's solidity and imposing effect.

The term "Neo-Manueline" refers to the 19th-century revival of Portuguese Manueline architecture. Manueline developed during the transition from Gothic to Renaissance architecture and incorporated Moorish elements in some buildings. (Note: In the art of the Iberian Peninsula, "Moorish" refers to ornamental forms derived from or adapted from Islamic art. The term does not mean that the building was a mosque or was designed by a Muslim.)

=== Oral tradition concerning supposed Islamic influences ===
The towers, arches, and bands of color have given rise in Belo Horizonte to a local belief that the church was designed by a Muslim or directly inspired by the style of a mosque. The known documentation, however, attributes the design to Brazilian engineer Edgard Nascentes Coelho. Construction was directed by Dutch Redemptorist brothers Gregório Mulders and Verenfrido Vogels. Sources concerning the church classify its architecture as eclectic, Gothic Revival, or Neo-Manueline, without identifying Muslim authorship or direct inspiration from Islamic architecture.

=== Plan and interior ===
The church measures 60 m (200 ft) long and 19 m (62 ft) wide and has a Latin-cross plan. Its main body follows a basilica layout, with a higher central nave, two side aisles, a transept, and polygonal apses at the sanctuary end and in the transept arms.

Arcades separate the central nave from the side aisles. The polychrome columns end in gilded Corinthian capitals. Above the arches are the clerestory windows, (Note: The clerestory is the row of windows set into the upper part of the central nave, above the arcades and the roofs of the side aisles.) which admit light through colored glass decorated with geometric patterns, stars, and flowers.

The nave leads to a raised chancel, which contains the high altar and the large painted composition in the apse. Blue ribs divide the ceiling into lighter fields containing ornamental frames and religious scenes. The walls, columns, arches, and trim were painted in multiple colors, leaving few interior surfaces undecorated.

The chapels in the transept arms contain altars dedicated to Our Lady of Perpetual Help, the Sacred Heart, Saint Alphonsus Liguori, and the Immaculate Conception.

== Paintings and iconographic program ==
=== Work of Guilherme Schumacher ===
Guilherme Schumacher arrived in Minas Gerais in 1910. His first work for the Redemptorists was a painting of Our Lady of Perpetual Help intended for the community in Curvelo. In Belo Horizonte, he offered to decorate the church and prepared a test painting in the baptistery.

After the work was approved, Schumacher was hired for 19 contos de réis. (Note: One conto de réis was equal to one million réis, the currency used in Brazil before the introduction of the cruzeiro.) He used a paint known as olsina and employed stencils to repeat friezes, arabesques, and decorative figures. Work began in 1911 in the side chapels, continued through the chancel, and ended in the central nave in late 1912.

Schumacher worked under the theological guidance of the Redemptorists and was assisted by a painter named Goretti, who was also responsible for the convent chapel. The ensemble combines figurative scenes with geometric forms, stylized animals, foliage, flowers, and human figures.

The paintings are often called "frescoes". Schumacher, however, worked with paint and stencils over the wall plaster. The ensemble can therefore also be called mural painting or painted decoration.

=== High altar and chancel ===
The central composition in the apse depicts the Holy Trinity, the Eucharist, angels, and groups of saints. God the Father occupies the upper portion, the Holy Spirit appears in the form of a dove, and Christ stands on the central axis. Kings, queens, bishops, members of religious orders, and laypeople complete the celestial court.

A statue of Saint Joseph with the Child Jesus stands before the panel. The first statue on the high altar was made of wood and was later transferred to the convent. Its replacement was formally enthroned on 2 December 1932. (Note: To enthrone a religious image means to place it solemnly in the location where it will be displayed for the veneration of worshippers.) Carved in marble by São Paulo sculptor Marino de Faneso, the statue weighs 789 kg (1,739 lb).

The ceiling of the chancel depicts the Virgin Mary with the Child Jesus. Forty medallions portray the ancestors of Christ from Abraham to Saint Joseph. The walls contain the Four Evangelists, while the Twelve Apostles occupy the spaces beside the lower windows. Six Doctors of the Church and Saint Joseph were painted above the arches.

=== Central nave ===
Eight paintings along the base of the ceiling depict episodes from the life of Saint Joseph. The scenes include his betrothal to Mary, the birth of Jesus, the Presentation in the Temple, the Flight into Egypt, the Finding in the Temple, his work as a carpenter, and his death.

On the upper walls, fourteen male saints occupy one side of the nave and fourteen female saints occupy the other. Their placement followed the custom of reserving separate parts of the church for men and women during services.

Two panels near the entrance concern Joseph of Egypt. One shows Joseph being sold by his brothers. The other depicts his exaltation in a triumphal chariot after he became an administrator in Egypt.

=== Side chapels ===
Paintings on the right side include episodes from the life of Saint Alphonsus Liguori, founder of the Redemptorists, the promise of redemption made to Adam and Eve, and the apparition of Our Lady of Lourdes to Bernadette Soubirous.

On the left, the decoration recounts the history of the icon of Our Lady of Perpetual Help. Other panels depict Calvary and the apparition of the Sacred Heart of Jesus to Margaret Mary Alacoque.

The images of Saint Alphonsus and Our Lady of Perpetual Help refer directly to Redemptorist spirituality. The congregation was founded by Alphonsus Liguori and promoted devotion to the icon of Perpetual Help in the communities where it worked.

=== Constellations and ornament ===
The side aisles contain sixteen celestial groupings. Twelve correspond to the traditional constellations of the zodiac. The remaining groups are Canis Major, Crux, Orion, and the ornamental Three Hares motif.

For the Redemptorists, the stars and constellations recall that God is the lord of time and the universe. They were not intended as references to astrology or horoscopes, but form part of the Christian narrative painted across the church's walls and vaults.

Medallions, flowers, foliage, arabesques, and animals appear between the celestial groups. Crux occupies a medallion surrounded by foliage above one of the doors. Deep blue areas of the vaults form a star-covered background repeated along the side aisles.

== Heritage protection and restoration ==
São José Church was placed under municipal heritage protection in 1990. On 10 November 1994, the municipality listed the architectural and landscaped ensemble formed by the church, forecourt, gardens, parish house, convent, Santo Afonso Building, parish hall, and other structures on the block. The area also forms part of the Conjunto Urbano Avenida Afonso Pena e Adjacências, or Afonso Pena Avenue and Adjacent Areas Urban Ensemble.

Changes made to the block during the 20th century altered its gardens, circulation routes, and façades. Annexes, walkways, stores, service facilities, and parking areas were constructed. Some additions obstructed views of the church or were built directly against the older buildings.

The parish prepared a master plan for the complex, coordinated by architect Altino Barbosa Caldeira and completed in May 2012. The study examined each building, the gardens, approaches, structural condition, and the legal status of the structures.

The Municipal Council for Cultural Heritage approved the plan on 16 May 2012. Its guidelines called for restoring the exterior colors, conserving the convent's exposed brickwork, removing structures that obstructed views of the church, restoring the retaining wall, reorganizing parking spaces, returning cobblestone paving, and adapting entrances for people with reduced mobility.

The plan also addressed the gardens and trees, signs around the block, fire protection, exterior lighting, and the conservation of paintings and other artworks integrated into the building.

Work carried out between 2010 and 2018 restored interior paintings and exterior colors that had been covered during earlier renovations. Removing later layers allowed ornament from the early 20th-century design to be recovered.

An inspection by the Municipal Cultural Foundation in March 2020 found that some provisions of the plan had not yet been carried out. Outstanding work remained at the former bookstore, telecommunications antenna, wall along Rua dos Tupis, cafeteria, and structures added to the Redemptorist residence.

== Administration and religious use ==
São José Parish has been administered by the Redemptorists since its establishment in 1900. The community's priests and brothers live in the convent on the same block and are responsible for Masses, confessions, sacraments, catechesis, prayer groups, and parish activities.

The feast of Saint Joseph is celebrated on 19 March. The religious calendar also includes novenas dedicated to Saint Joseph, Our Lady of Perpetual Help, and Saint Gerard, another Redemptorist saint.

A survey submitted by the parish to the municipality in 2019 estimated that approximately 5,000 people visited the complex on Sundays, when seven Masses were celebrated. About 80 percent of those attending came from other parts of Belo Horizonte.

== Gallery ==
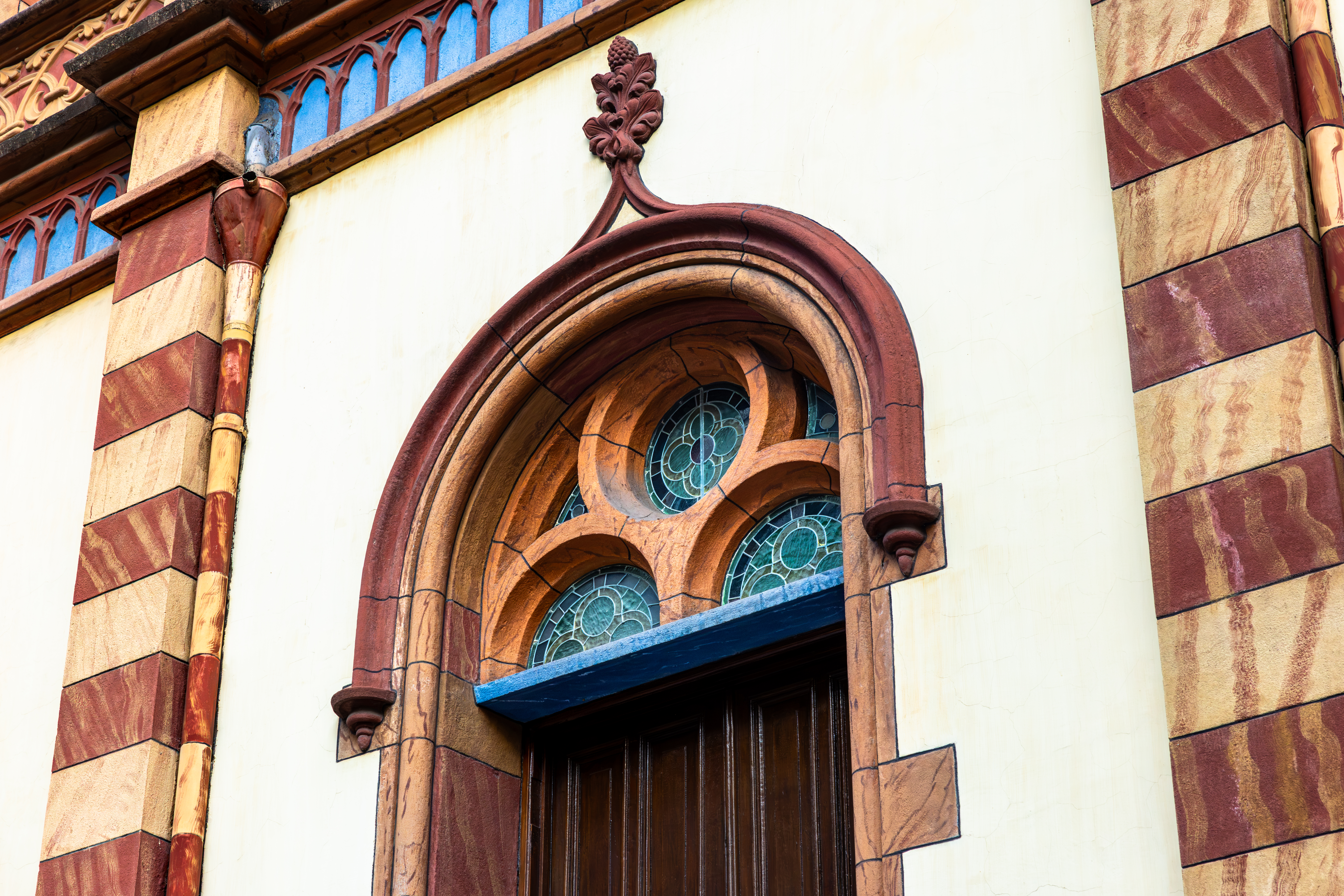
Architectural detail of a side entrance to São José Archdiocesan Sanctuary

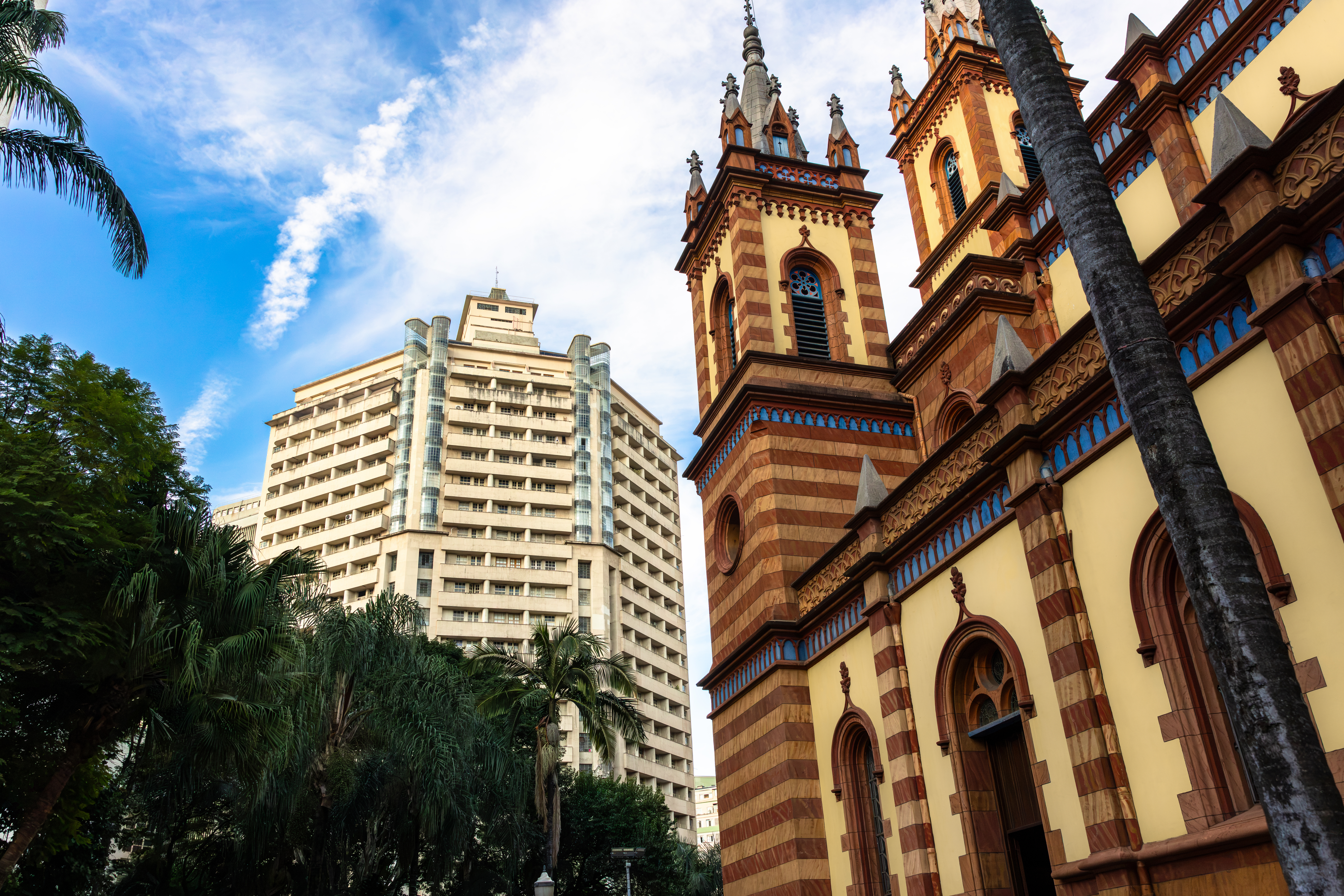
Oblique view of the sanctuary, with the Acaiaca Building in the background

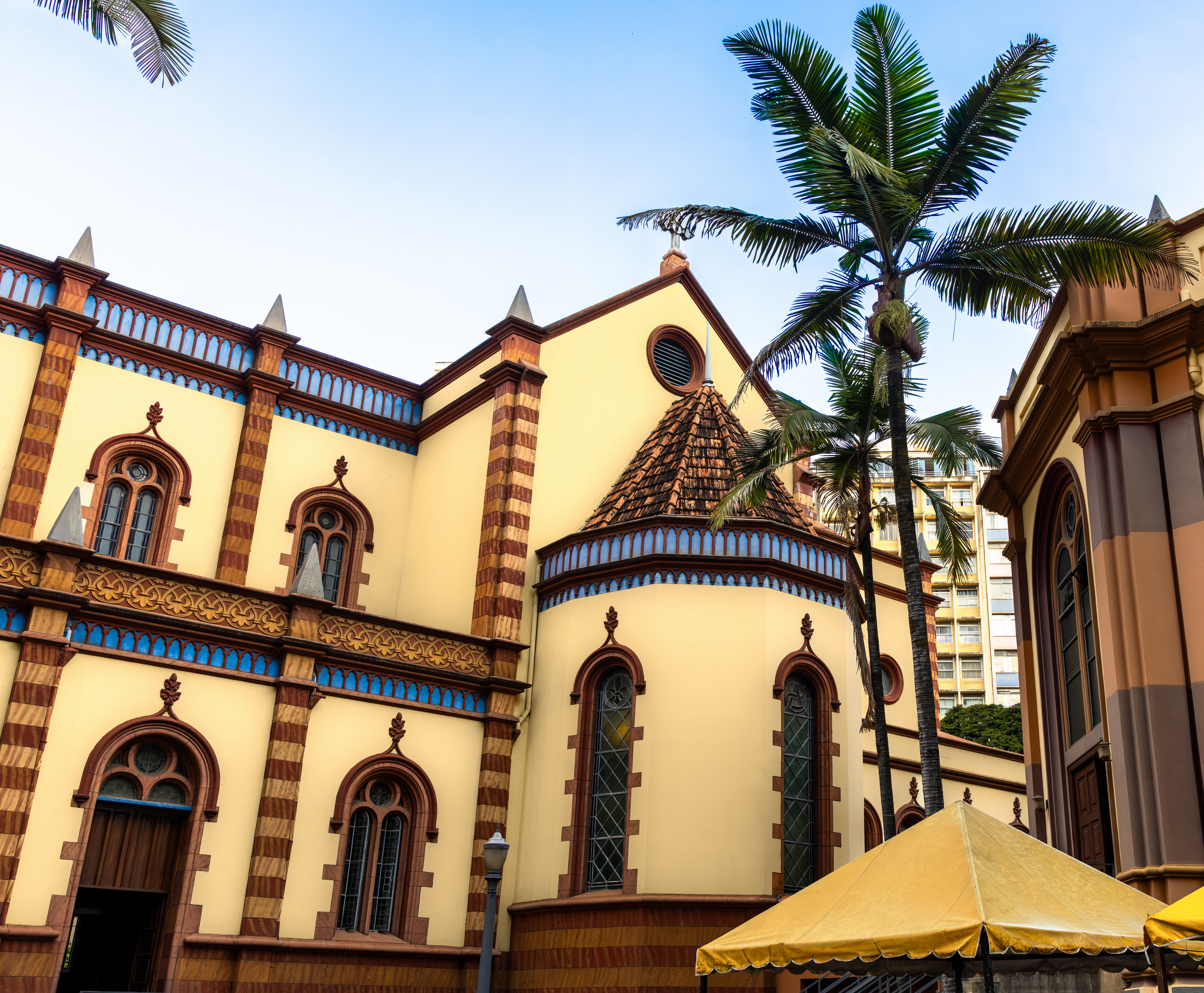
Side courtyard, arched windows, and polygonal volume of the sanctuary

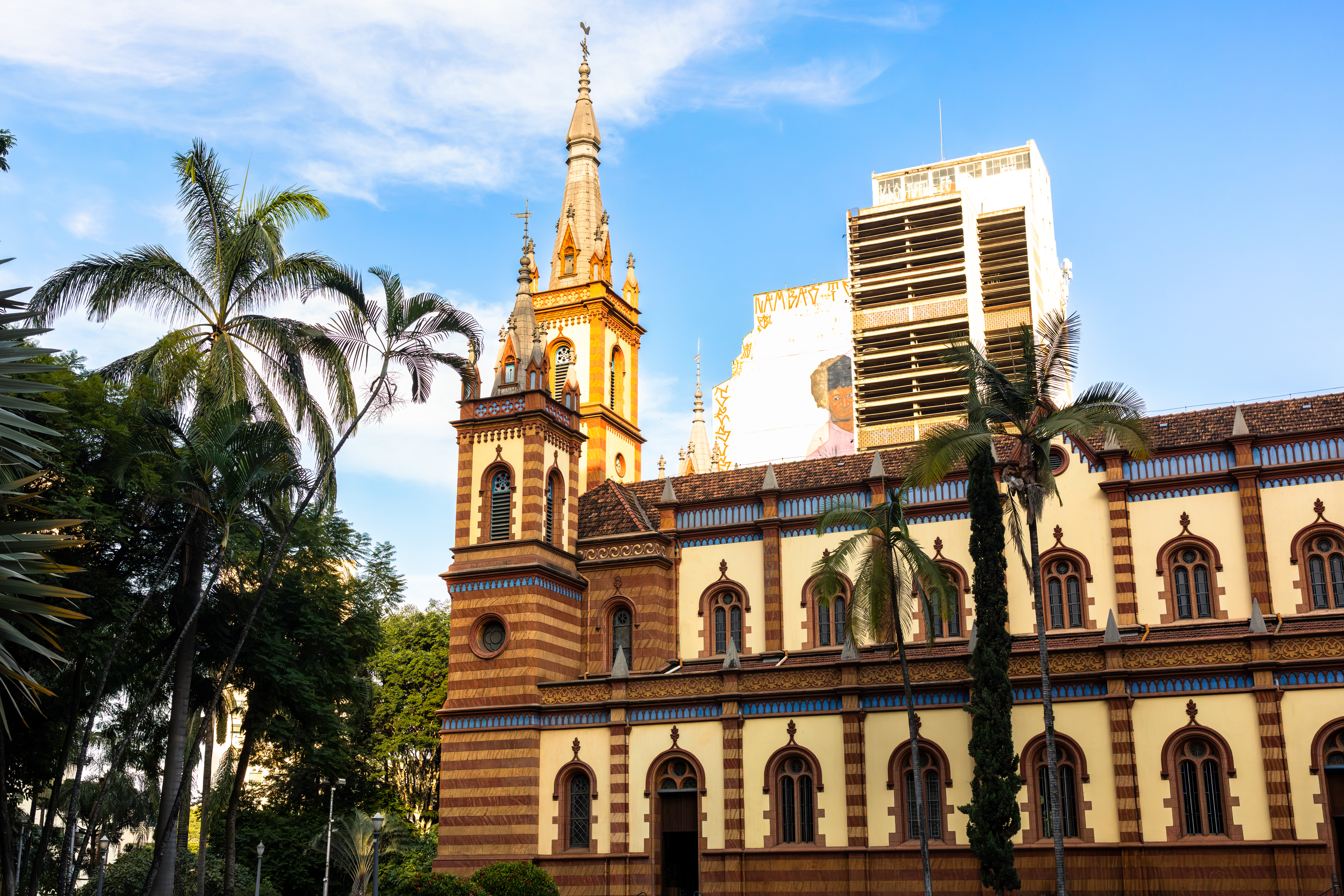
Side elevation and one of the sanctuary's towers

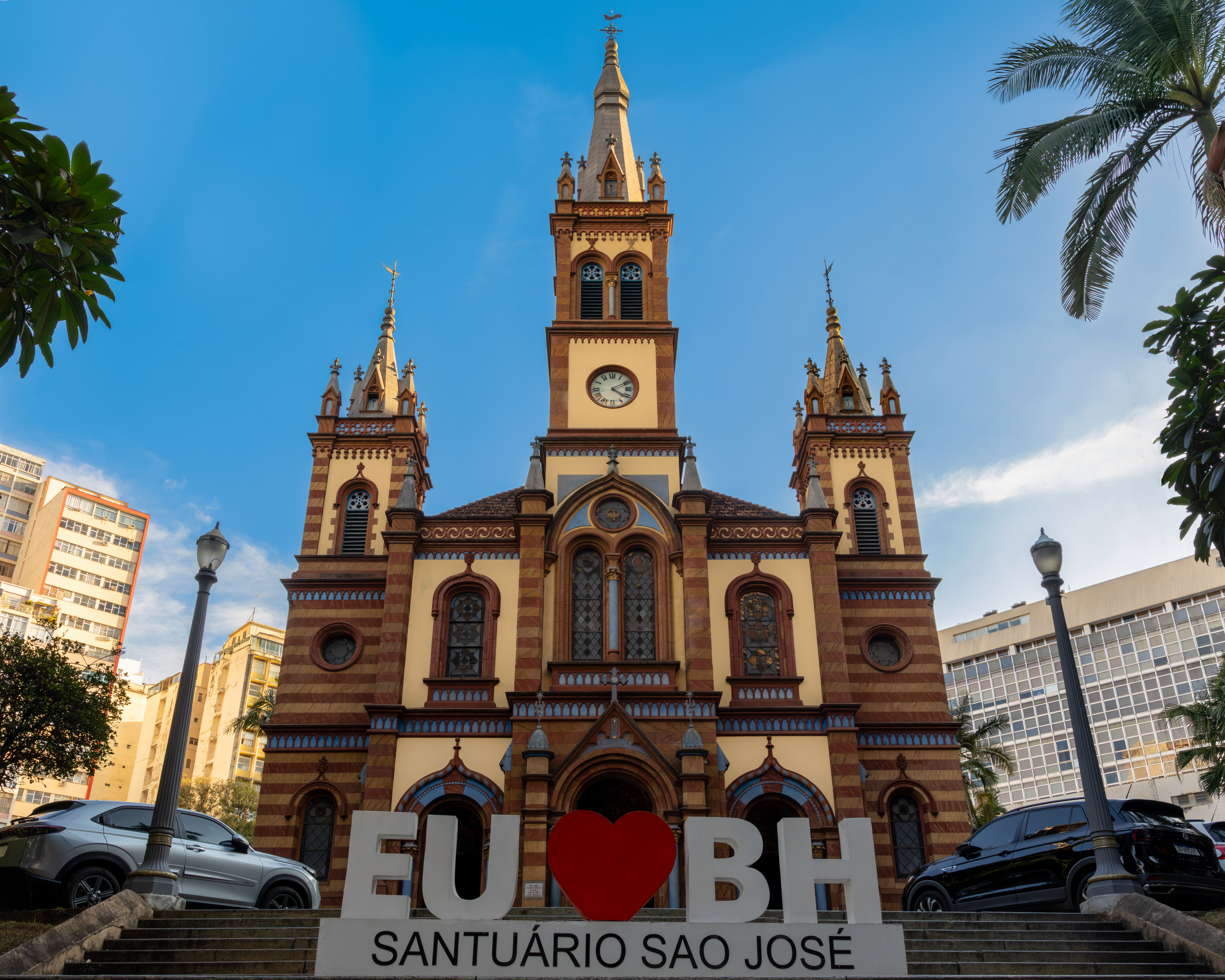
Main façade and the "Eu amo BH" sign

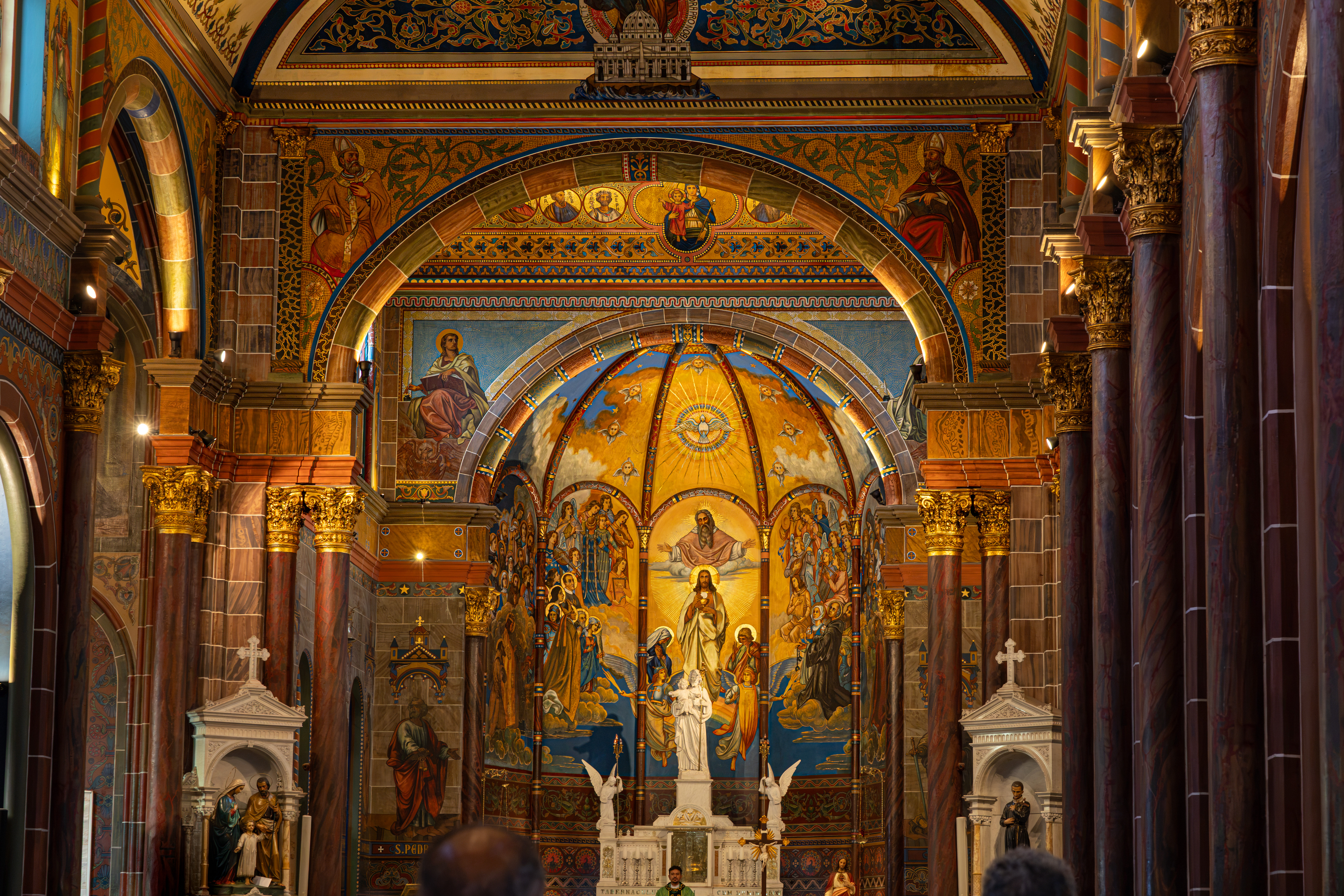
High altar, statue of Saint Joseph with the Child Jesus, and painting of the Holy Trinity

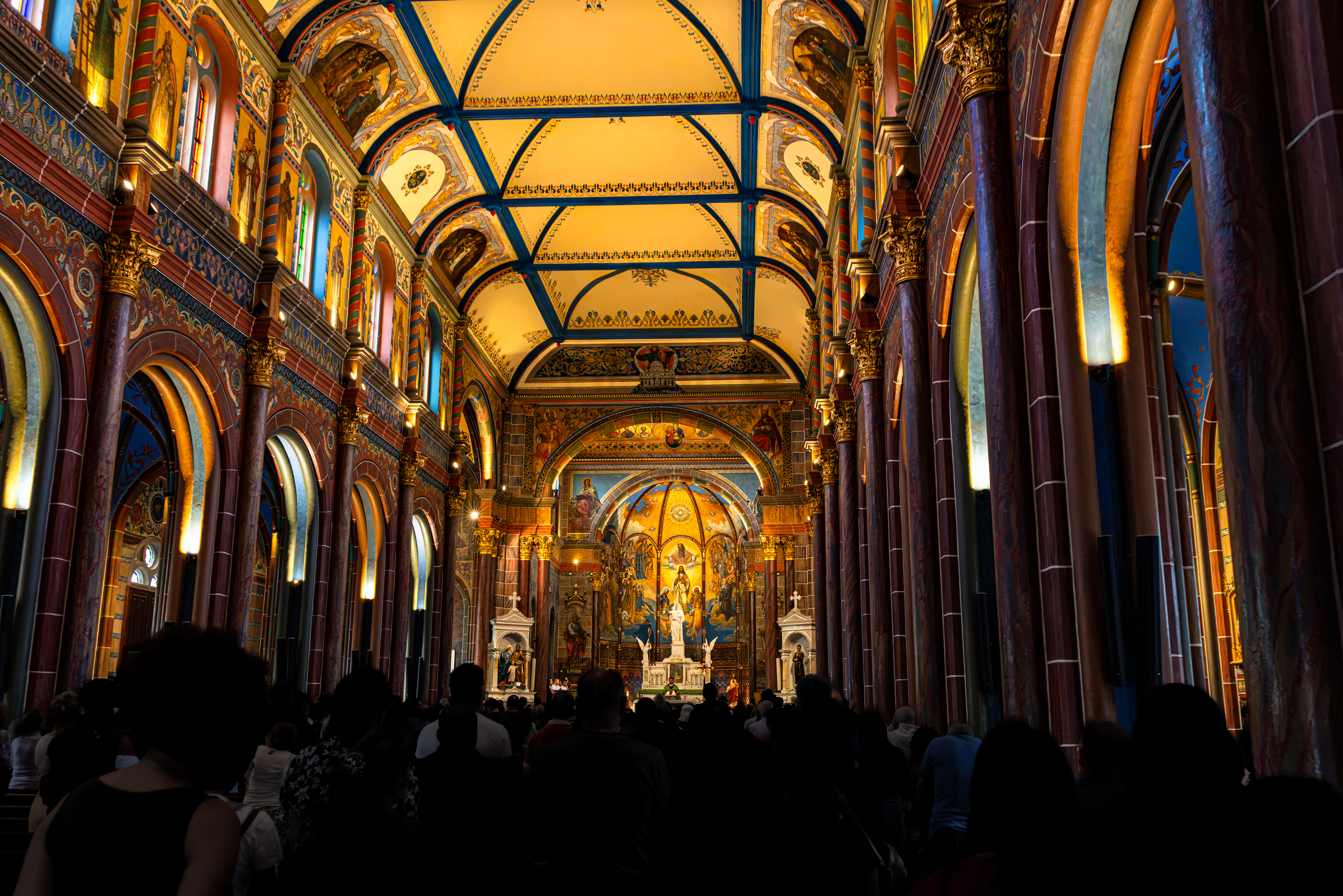
Central nave during a Catholic service

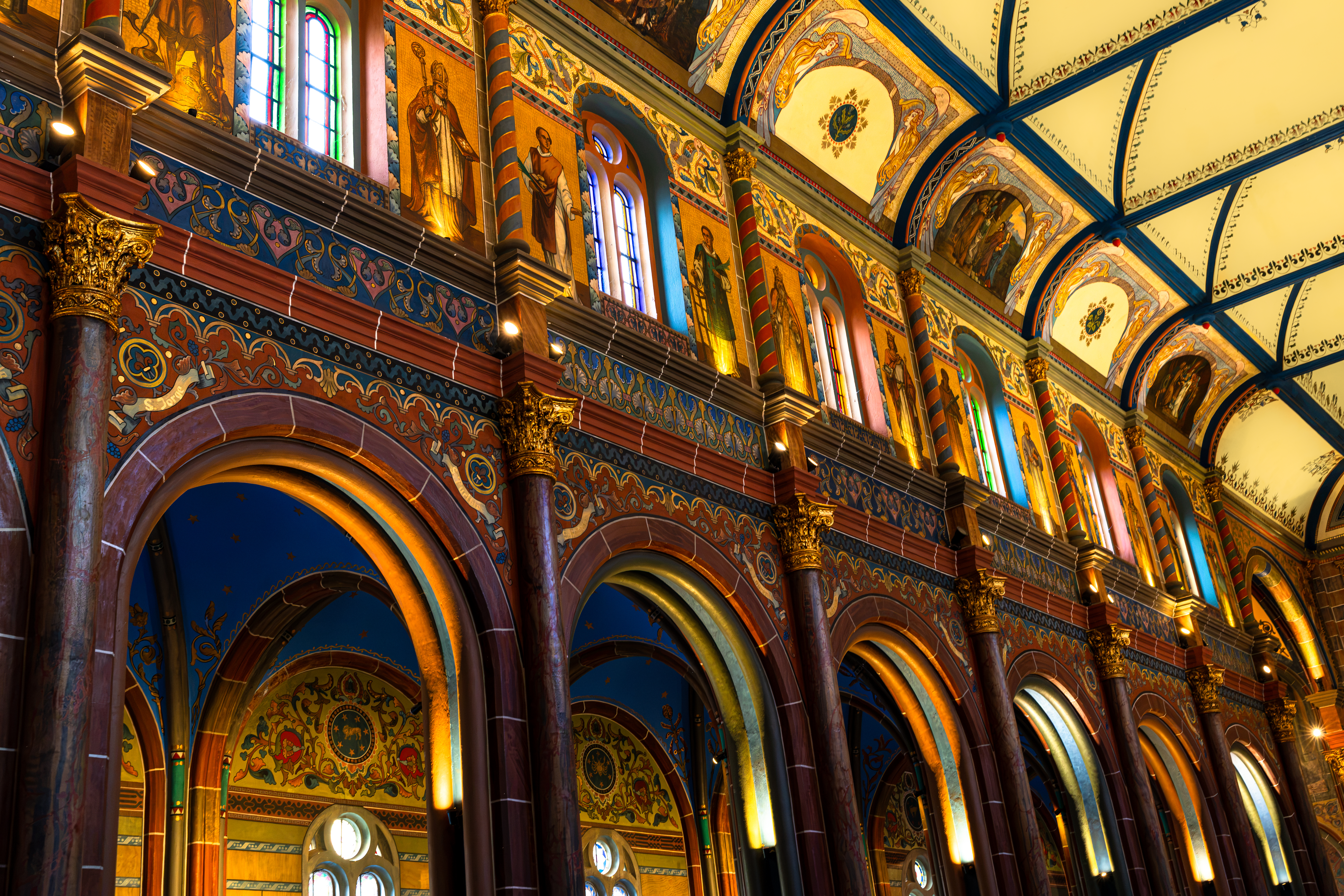
Arcades, ornamental paintings, and clerestory windows

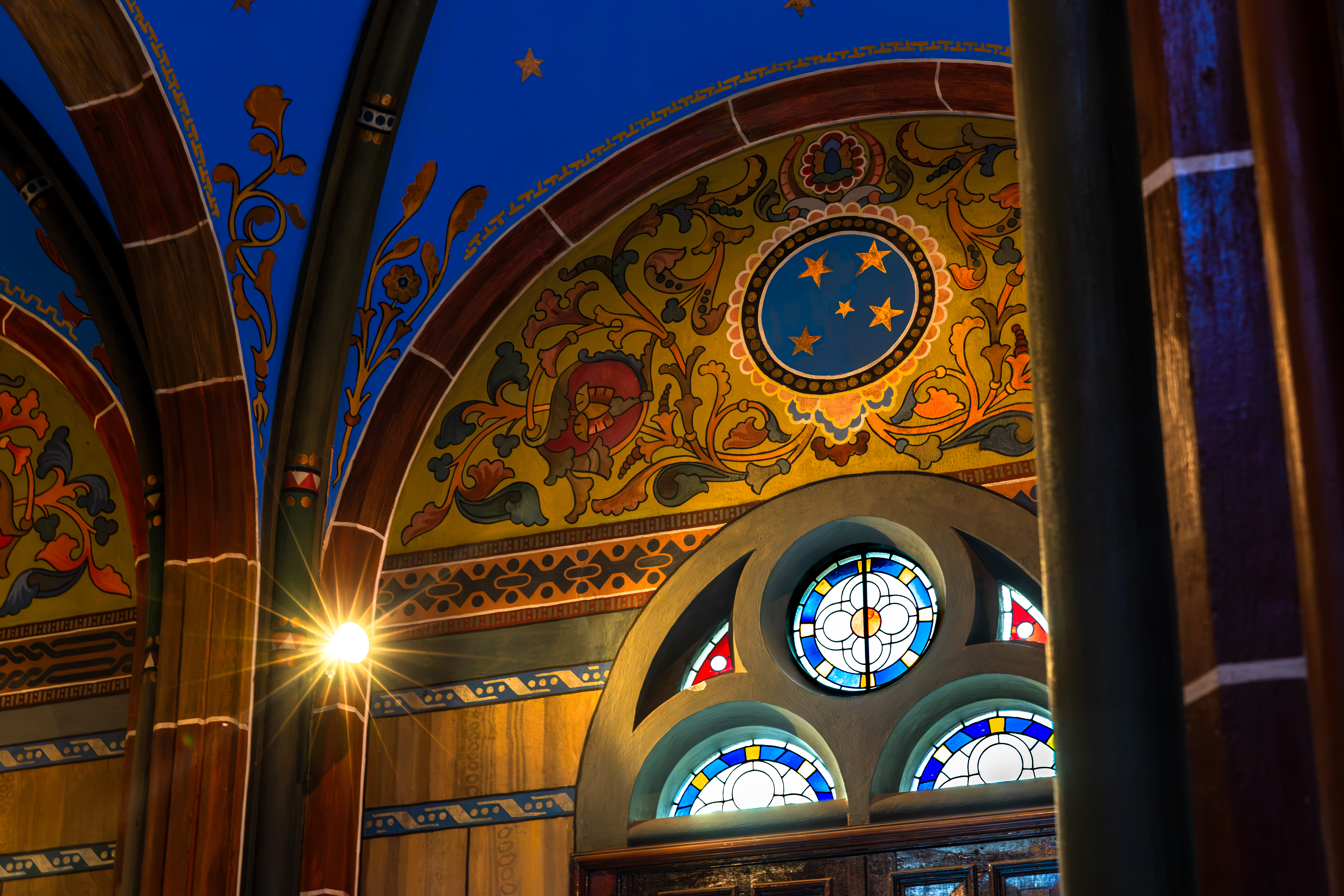
Medallion of Crux and stained glass inside the sanctuary

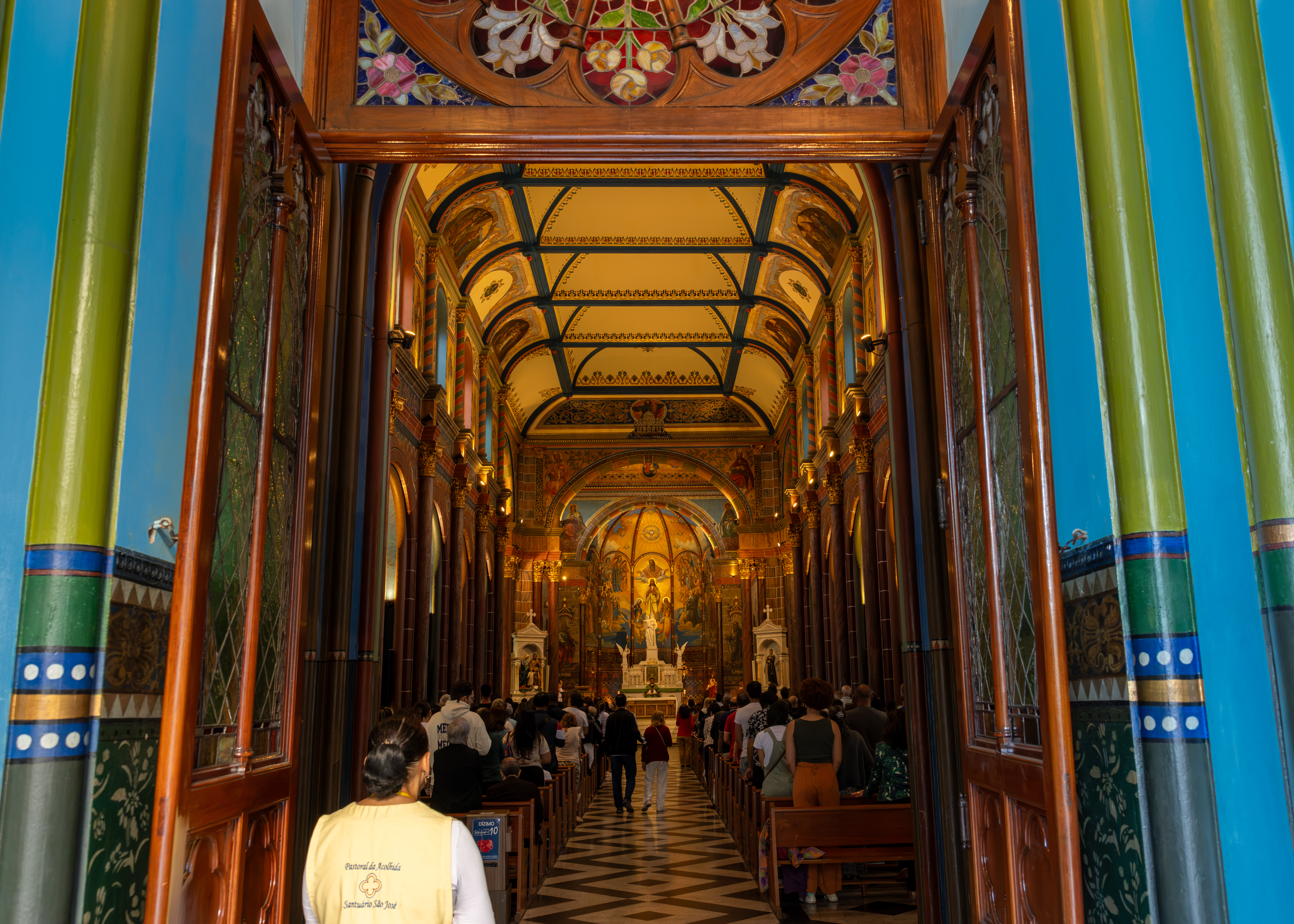
View from the entrance toward the central nave and high altar

== See also ==
- Redemptorists, the religious congregation that has administered the church since the parish was established
- Archdiocese of Belo Horizonte, the ecclesiastical territory to which the sanctuary belongs
- Our Lady of Good Voyage Church, Belo Horizonte, the former cathedral and diocesan seat of the Archdiocese of Belo Horizonte

== Bibliography ==
- Araújo, João Teixeira de (2013). "Cidade moderna, igreja persuasiva: a legitimação de uma nova capital para Minas através da Igreja São José" [Modern city, persuasive church: the legitimization of a new capital for Minas through São José Church]. E-hum (in Brazilian Portuguese). 6 (2): 38–50.
- Caldeira, Altino Barbosa (2012). "A conservação do patrimônio histórico, arquitetônico e urbano do conjunto da Igreja de São José de Belo Horizonte, Minas Gerais, Brasil" [Conservation of the historical, architectural and urban heritage of the São José Church complex in Belo Horizonte, Minas Gerais, Brazil]. Disegnarecon (in Brazilian Portuguese). 5 (10): 81–86. doi:10.6092/issn.1828-5961/3278.
- Oliveira, Leônidas José de, ed. (2013). Arte, arquitetura e religiosidade em Belo Horizonte [Art, architecture and religion in Belo Horizonte] (PDF) (in Brazilian Portuguese). Belo Horizonte: Fundação Municipal de Cultura, Museu Histórico Abílio Barreto. ISBN 978-85-60029-09-9.
