= Christ the King Cathedral, Belo Horizonte =

Coordinates: 19.8203°S 43.9456°W

Christ the King Cathedral
- Catedral Cristo Rei
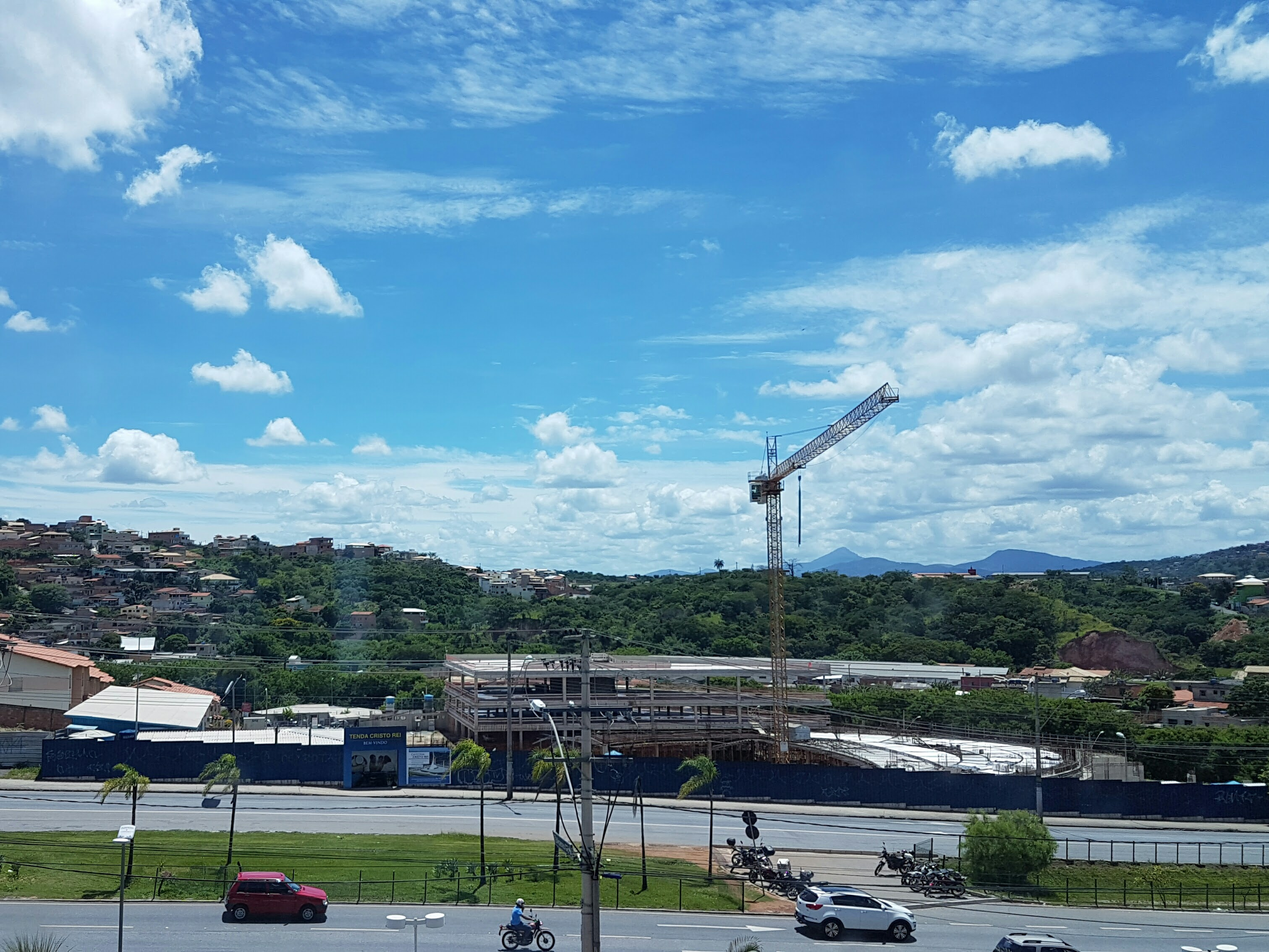
- The Cathedral under construction
- Christ the King Cathedral
- Location: Belo Horizonte
- Country: Brazil
- Denomination: Roman Catholic Church

Administration
- Archdiocese: Roman Catholic Archdiocese of Belo Horizonte

The Christ the King Cathedral, (Portuguese: Catedral Cristo Rei) also known as the Belo Horizonte Cathedral, is a Catholic religious cathedral, currently under construction, located in Belo Horizonte, Minas Gerais, in Brazil. The building is the latest project of the renowned architect Oscar Niemeyer for the city and will be the headquarters of the Archdiocese of Belo Horizonte.

The cathedral is dedicated to Christ the King, according to the election of Bishop Antonio dos Santos Cabral, who arrived in Belo Horizonte in 1922 to install the diocese of the capital. The original proposal for the cathedral location would be today at Milton Campos Square, at the top of Afonso Pena Avenue, in the southern and central region of Belo Horizonte, at a time when there were only three churches in Belo Horizonte: Our Lady of Good Journey, temporary headquarters of the diocese, the Church of St. Joseph and the Church of Our Lady of the Rosary, however, the site chosen for the building was a plot on the Cristiano Machado Avenue in the north of the city .

Niemeyer was approached in late 2005, and finished the project in mid 2006. The work, funded by donations, began in 2013 and was expected to be completed by 2020, though to this day its completion is still ongoing.

== See also ==
- List of cathedrals in Brazil
- Roman Catholicism in Brazil
- Our Lady of Good Voyage Cathedral, Belo Horizonte
