= Boa Viagem =

Boa Viagem can mean:

- The Portuguese language greeting for good travel, equivalent to French Bon voyage
- Boa Viagem, Recife, a beach and neighborhood in the city of Recife, Brazil
- Boa Viagem, Niterói, a beach and neighborhood in the city of Niterói, Brazil
- Boa Viagem, Ceará, a municipality in the state of Ceará, Brazil
- Boa Viagem Esporte Clube, an association football club based in Boa Viagem, Ceará
