= Our Lady of Good Voyage Church, Belo Horizonte =

Roman Catholic church and former cathedral in Belo Horizonte, Brazil

Our Lady of Good Voyage Church
- Santuário Arquidiocesano da Santíssima Eucaristia – Paróquia Nossa Senhora da Boa Viagem
- Catedral Nossa Senhora da Boa Viagem; Igreja de Nossa Senhora da Boa Viagem
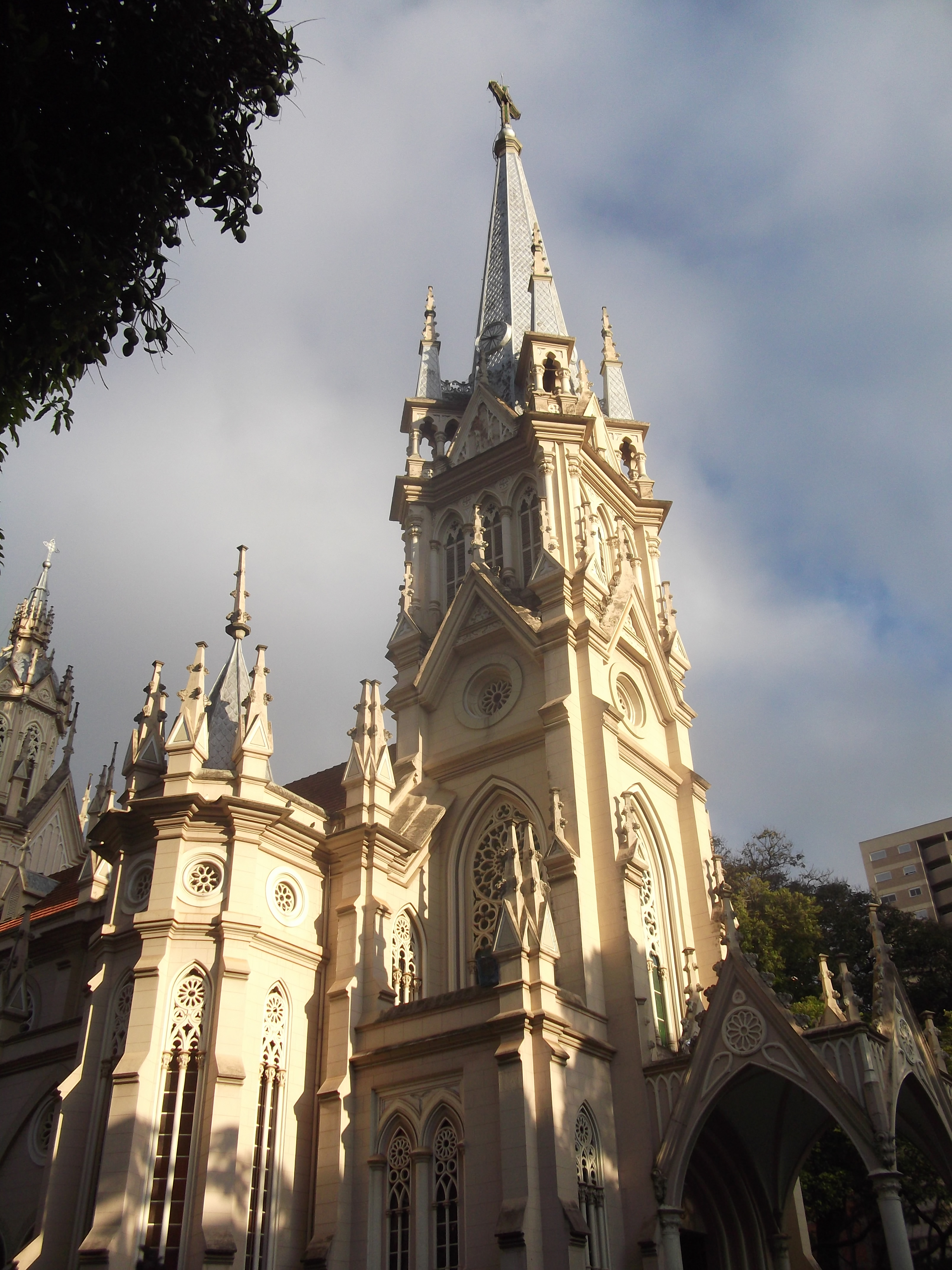
- The church and its central tower
- Our Lady of Good Voyage Church
- 19.928482°S 43.935030°W
- Location: Belo Horizonte, Minas Gerais
- Address: Rua Sergipe, 175
- Country: Brazil
- Denomination: Catholic
- Sui iuris church: Latin Church
- Website: santuarionossasenhoradaboaviagem.arquidiocesebh.org.br

History
- Status: Former cathedral; Parish church; Archdiocesan shrine
- Founded: c. 1711 as a parish
- Dedication: Our Lady of Good Voyage
- Dedicated: 8 December 1923
- Consecrated: 15 August 1932

Architecture
- Functional status: Active
- Heritage designation: State-listed cultural property of Minas Gerais
- Designated: 2 June 1977
- Architect(s): Unknown overall Tower and interior stucco by João Morandi; 1931 additions by the office of Luís Signorelli
- Architectural type: Church
- Style: Gothic Revival
- Years built: 1911–1931
- Groundbreaking: 3 September 1911
- Completed: 1931

Specifications
- Materials: Solid brick masonry and a French-tile roof

Administration
- Archdiocese: Archdiocese of Belo Horizonte
- Parish: Nossa Senhora da Boa Viagem

Our Lady of Good Voyage Church (Portuguese: Igreja de Nossa Senhora da Boa Viagem), long known as Our Lady of Good Voyage Cathedral (Portuguese: Catedral Nossa Senhora da Boa Viagem), is a Catholic parish church and archdiocesan Eucharistic shrine in Belo Horizonte, Minas Gerais, Brazil. The building opened as the cathedral of the Diocese of Belo Horizonte in 1923 and was consecrated as the metropolitan cathedral in 1932. It remained the seat of the Archdiocese of Belo Horizonte until 2021, when the cathedral title passed to Christ the King Cathedral.

Catholic worship at the site began in the early eighteenth century, when a chapel was built for an image of Our Lady of Good Voyage brought from Portugal. The present Gothic Revival church was erected from 1911 to 1931 beside the colonial mother church of Curral Del Rei, which was demolished in 1932. The central tower and the stucco decoration of the nave and chancel were designed by the Swiss architect João Morandi. The church also contains the eighteenth-century Marian image and furnishings transferred from the former mother church.

Perpetual Eucharistic adoration began there in 1937. Priests of the Congregation of the Blessed Sacrament have administered the devotion and parish since 1938. The church, its square, and a group of liturgical objects were placed under state protection in 1977. Belo Horizonte designated the site as its official Marco Zero, or point of origin, in 2024.

== History ==
=== Chapel and parish at Curral Del Rei ===
In the early eighteenth century, the Portuguese settler Francisco Homem Del Rei received a sesmaria (Note: A sesmaria was a Portuguese colonial land grant intended to encourage settlement and cultivation.) in the region that became Belo Horizonte. He brought a small painted and gilded wooden image of Our Lady of Good Voyage and placed it in a wattle and daub chapel. The Marian title had been invoked by Portuguese seafarers, while the chapel at Curral Del Rei drew travelers and tropeiros, the muleteers who carried livestock and goods through inland Brazil.

The Parish of Our Lady of Good Voyage of Curral Del Rei was formed in the first half of the eighteenth century, probably around 1711, after its separation from the Parish of Our Lady of the Conception of Raposos. A royal decree issued on 16 January 1752 made it a collative parish, giving its resident vicar a permanent benefice under royal patronage. A larger mother church replaced the first chapel around 1755 as the settlement grew.

=== Belo Horizonte and the present church ===
When the republican government of Minas Gerais chose Curral Del Rei for its new capital, the Comissão Construtora da Nova Capital (Note: The Comissão Construtora da Nova Capital, or Construction Commission of the New Capital, planned and built Belo Horizonte during the 1890s.) laid a new grid of streets and avenues across the old settlement. The commission proposed replacing the mother church of Our Lady of Good Voyage and the Chapel of Our Lady of the Rosary. The Bishop of Mariana agreed only if the replacement churches were finished before the old buildings were removed.

A proposed church at Alto do Cruzeiro, near the end of Avenida Afonso Pena, was never built. In 1902, the land occupied by the Boa Viagem mother church returned to the diocese on the condition that the old building be preserved and repaired.

Work on the present church began in 1911. The towers of the colonial mother church were removed and its facade was altered early that year. On 3 September, the foundation stone of a new Gothic Revival church was blessed on the adjoining land. The old mother church remained beside the construction site and continued in use until its demolition in 1932.

The architect of the main design has not been established. João Morandi designed the tower and the stucco decoration of the nave and chancel. The church was built with solid brick walls, a French-tile roof, and molded mortar details made to resemble carved stone.

=== Cathedral and Eucharistic shrine ===
Pope Benedict XV created the Diocese of Belo Horizonte on 11 February 1921. A solemn Mass was held in the unfinished church on 7 September 1922, the centenary of Brazilian independence. The ceremony also accompanied the installation of the diocese's first bishop, Antônio dos Santos Cabral, and the inauguration of state president Raul Soares de Moura.

The church was inaugurated as the diocesan cathedral on 8 December 1923. Pope Pius XI raised Belo Horizonte to an archdiocese in 1924. Work continued through 1931, when the office of Luís Signorelli designed the last additions of the original building campaign. The church was consecrated as the metropolitan cathedral on 15 August 1932.

The colonial mother church was demolished in 1932 after years of debate about its place in the new capital. The demolition prompted protests from residents. Archbishop Antônio dos Santos Cabral regarded Boa Viagem as a temporary cathedral because its interior could not hold the archdiocese's larger ceremonies. He pursued plans for a new cathedral dedicated to Christ the King, though construction of the present Christ the King Cathedral began much later.

Belo Horizonte hosted the Second National Eucharistic Congress in 1936. Perpetual adoration of the Blessed Sacrament began at the cathedral on the Feast of Christ the King in 1937. The Congregation of the Blessed Sacrament took charge of the adoration and parish work in 1938.

Archbishop Walmor Oliveira de Azevedo gave the parish the title of Santuário de Adoração Perpétua Nossa Senhora da Boa Viagem in 2017. Its full ecclesiastical name is Santuário Arquidiocesano da Santíssima Eucaristia – Paróquia Nossa Senhora da Boa Viagem. On 11 February 2021, the centenary of the archdiocese, the metropolitan cathedral title was transferred to Christ the King Cathedral. Boa Viagem remained a parish church and archdiocesan shrine.

== Architecture ==
=== Exterior and adjoining buildings ===
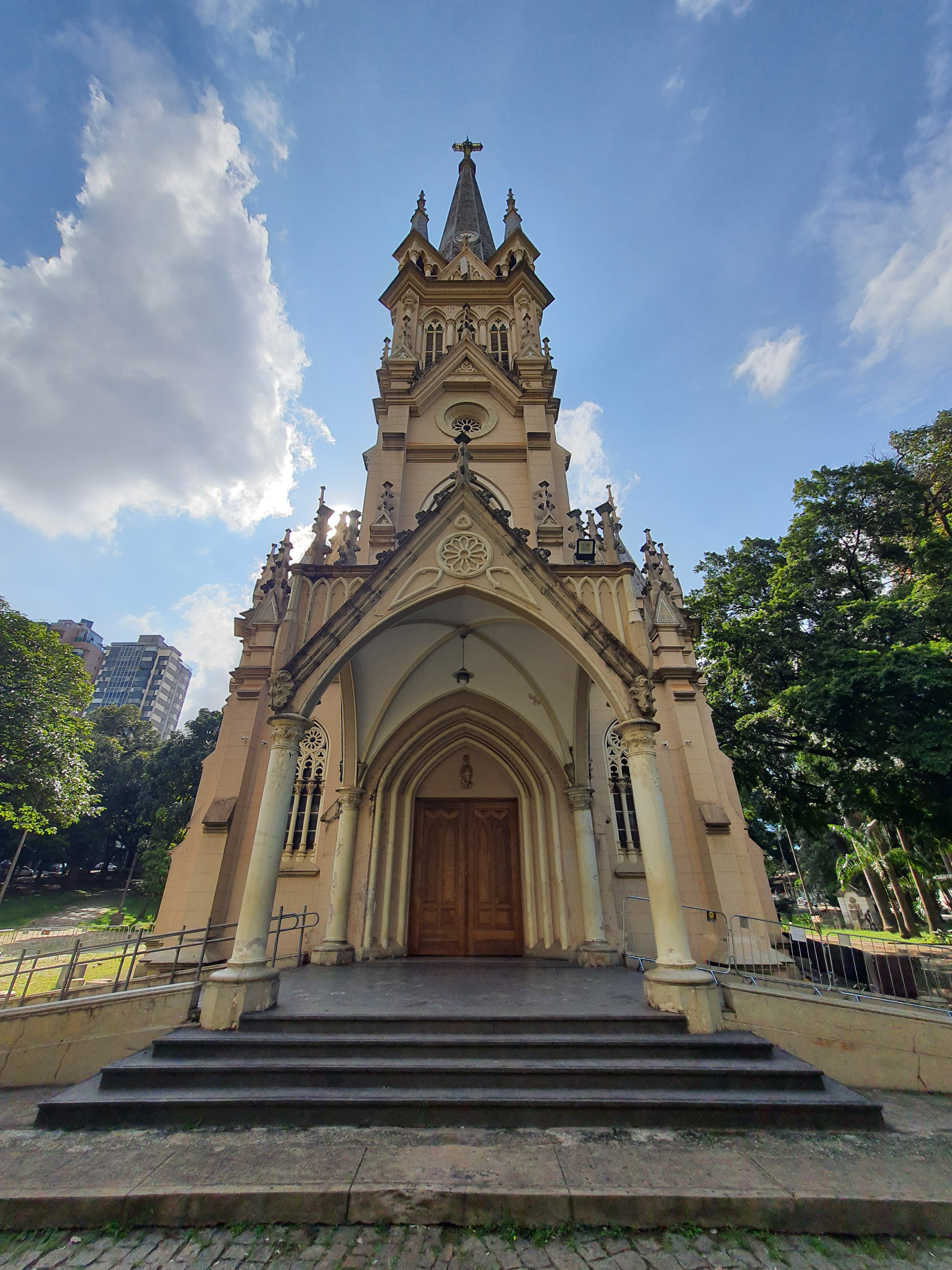
Main entrance and central tower

The church has a Latin-cross plan, solid brick walls, and a French-tile roof. Its main front is arranged around a tall central tower. Pointed doorways and windows, pinnacles, and molded stucco ornament give the facade its Gothic Revival appearance. The mortar details imitate cut stone.

João Morandi's design work covered the tower and the stucco decoration inside the nave and chancel. The architect of the remaining structure is unknown. The office of Luís Signorelli prepared the 1931 additions and designed the attached parish house and consistory. These rooms occupy a two-story U-shaped block around a garden, with vaulted passages facing the inner courtyard.

The Chapel of the Blessed Sacrament, dedicated to Saint Peter Julian Eymard, was built on the left side of the church in 1944. The original entrance portico was removed in 1949, and a clock was installed in the tower in 1951.

=== Interior and furnishings ===
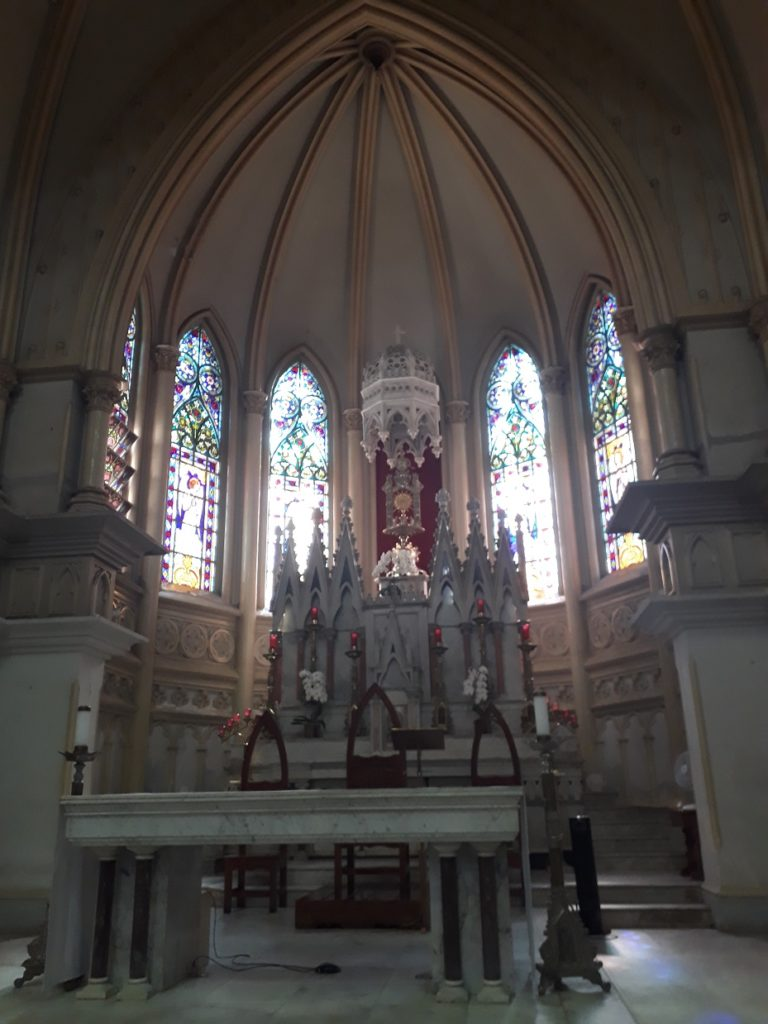
Chancel and high altar

A vestibule and wooden windbreak separate the main door from the nave. The tomb of Antônio dos Santos Cabral, the first metropolitan archbishop of Belo Horizonte, is on the right and is covered by a black marble slab. The baptistery is on the left. Its Calvary group depicts the crucified Christ with the Virgin Mary, Saint John the Evangelist, and Mary Magdalene.

Broad pointed arches divide the interior, and ribbed vaults cover the nave and chancel. Yellow wall surfaces rise from a marbled base. Ochre ribs cross pale blue vaults above the nave.

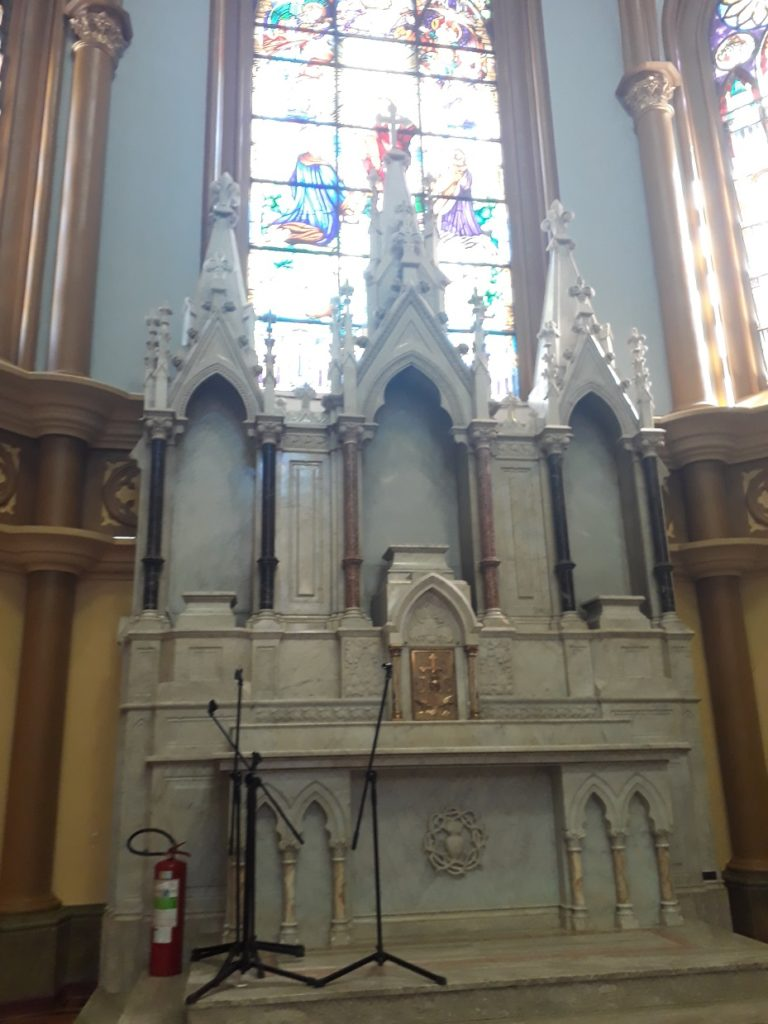
Side altar beneath a stained-glass window

The eighteenth-century image of Our Lady of Good Voyage stands on the Epistle side of the altar, to the right as seen from the nave. It is the image traditionally said to have been brought from Portugal by Francisco Homem Del Rei.

The choir above the entrance holds the retable of the Sacred Heart of Jesus, transferred from the old mother church. The painted and gilded wooden structure probably dates from the late eighteenth century. Its carving belongs to the Minas Gerais Rococo and uses acanthus leaves, roses, and other plant forms against a white ground.

== Parish and devotions ==
The Congregation of the Blessed Sacrament administers the parish and the chapel of perpetual adoration. The Blessed Sacrament is exposed for prayer throughout the day and night, with lay worshippers assigned to regular periods of adoration.

The feast of Our Lady of Good Voyage is held from 6 to 15 August. The final day is the feast day of Belo Horizonte's patron saint. The program has Masses, a novena, the Rosary, and an evening candlelight procession through central Belo Horizonte that ends at the church.

The Caminhada com Maria, or Walk with Mary, forms another part of the feast. A pilgrim image leaves the shrine and visits parishes in the archdiocese dedicated to Marian titles.

== Heritage protection and restoration ==
=== State listing ===
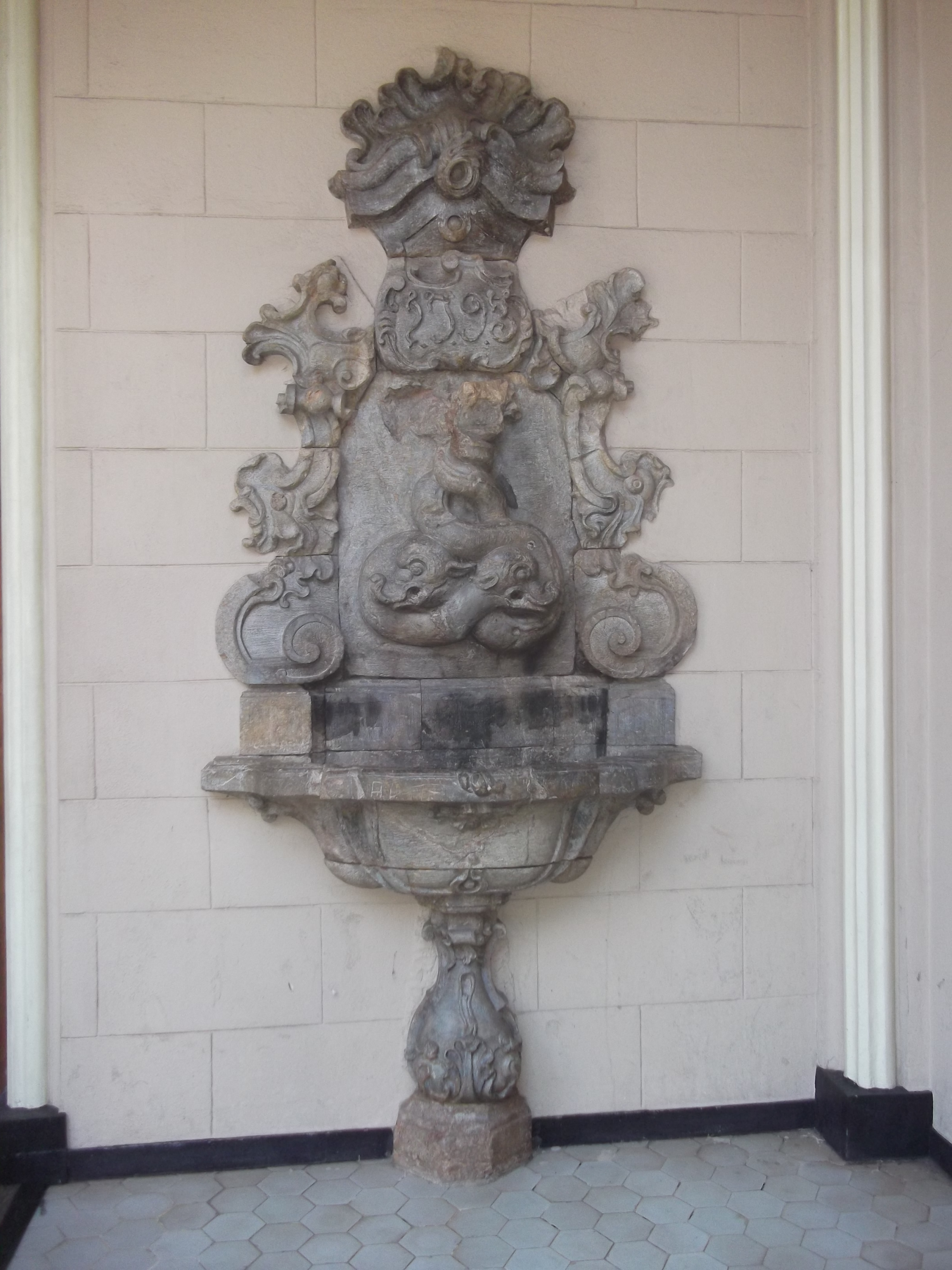
Sacristy lavatory from the former mother church

Decree No. 18,531 placed the church and its surroundings under state protection on 2 June 1977. The protected area covers the building and the square bounded by Rua Sergipe, Rua dos Timbiras, Rua Alagoas, and Rua dos Aimorés. The listing also covers the paths, gardens, and trees in the square.

The decree protects liturgical and artistic objects from the old mother church. These are the image of Our Lady of Good Voyage, the sacristy lavatory, the baptismal font, three retables, and two bells. It also covers the monstrance used at the 1936 National Eucharistic Congress.

The church and square were entered in the state's archaeological, ethnographic, and landscape heritage book. The image, lavatory, baptismal font, monstrance, and retables were entered in the fine arts heritage book. The bells were entered in the historical heritage book.

=== Restoration ===
The gardens were restored in 1994. The work renewed the lawns and paving, added seating, and installed lighting and an irrigation system.

A restoration campaign begun in 2015 repaired the roof and replaced damaged tiles. Work inside the church reached the side chapels, altars, wooden floor, electrical system, wall painting, nave, choir, tribunes, Calvary room, and crypt. Conservators uncovered the original pale blue and ochre interior colors beneath later coats of paint. The eighteenth-century image of Our Lady of Good Voyage was also restored. The first stage was completed in 2019.

The Sacred Heart retable remained at the Museu Histórico Abílio Barreto until 1999, when it was restored and installed in the choir of the church. IEPHA commissioned another treatment in 2020. The project called for termite control, repairs to the wooden structure, replacement of missing elements, cleaning, and reintegration of the paint and gilding.

=== Marco Zero ===
Municipal Law No. 11,724, sanctioned on 23 July 2024 and published the following day, designated the geographic point occupied by the church as Belo Horizonte's official Marco Zero. The designation refers to the site as the point of origin of Curral Del Rei, the settlement replaced by the planned capital during the 1890s.

== See also ==
- Archdiocese of Belo Horizonte
- Christ the King Cathedral, Belo Horizonte
- Basilica of Our Lady of Lourdes, Belo Horizonte
- São José Church
- List of cathedrals in Brazil
