= Centro, Belo Horizonte =

Coordinates: 19°55′13″S 43°56′18″W

Centro (Belo Horizonte)
- Neighborhood
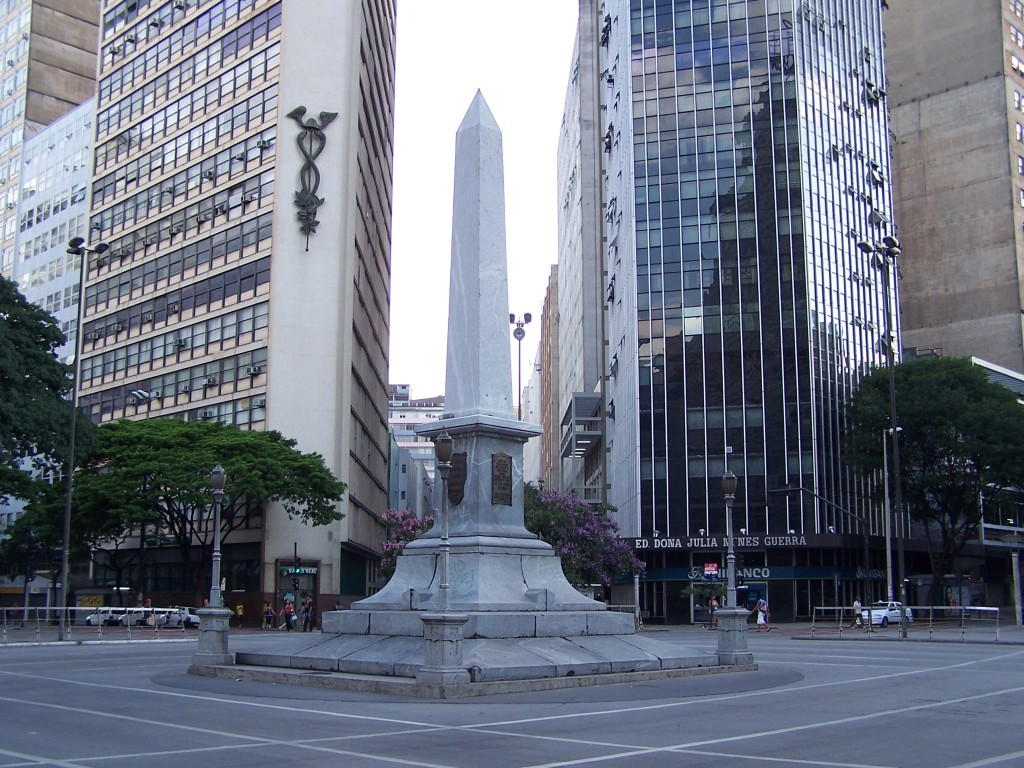
- Interactive map of Centro (Belo Horizonte)
- Country: Brazil
- State: Minas Gerais
- Municipality: Belo Horizonte
- Administrative region: Centro-Sul

Centro (lit. 'Center') is a neighbourhood of Belo Horizonte, located in the central region of the city.

== History ==
The site where the Center is located today was a village that was previously called Arraial de Nossa Senhora do Curral Del Rey, expropriated to make way for the new capital of the State of Minas Gerais in 1893. The decision was made through Law No. 3, an addition to the Constitution.

It was designed by engineer Aarão Reis, head of the New Capital Construction Commission. He innovated by creating a plan in which the avenues crossed diagonally, instead of the classic checkerboard pattern of the big cities of the time, such as Washington and Paris. The project was ambitious and pharaonic, but it was designed with an eye to the future, in which avenues and streets were wider than conventional ones. That same year, lots for the construction of businesses were auctioned. Those who acquired the lots would have a period of four years to build. The idea was to make Belo Horizonte the commercial center of the State in a short time.

The poor population and workers were not part of this scene. They lived in areas far from the city center, and their financial condition prevented them from participating in paid entertainment. In addition, in the central area they were easy targets for the police, who could arrest them during a simple walk on the grounds of "vagrancy".
