= Our Lady of Good Voyage Church (Gloucester, Massachusetts) =

Historic church in Massachusetts, United States

- U.S. National Register of Historic Places
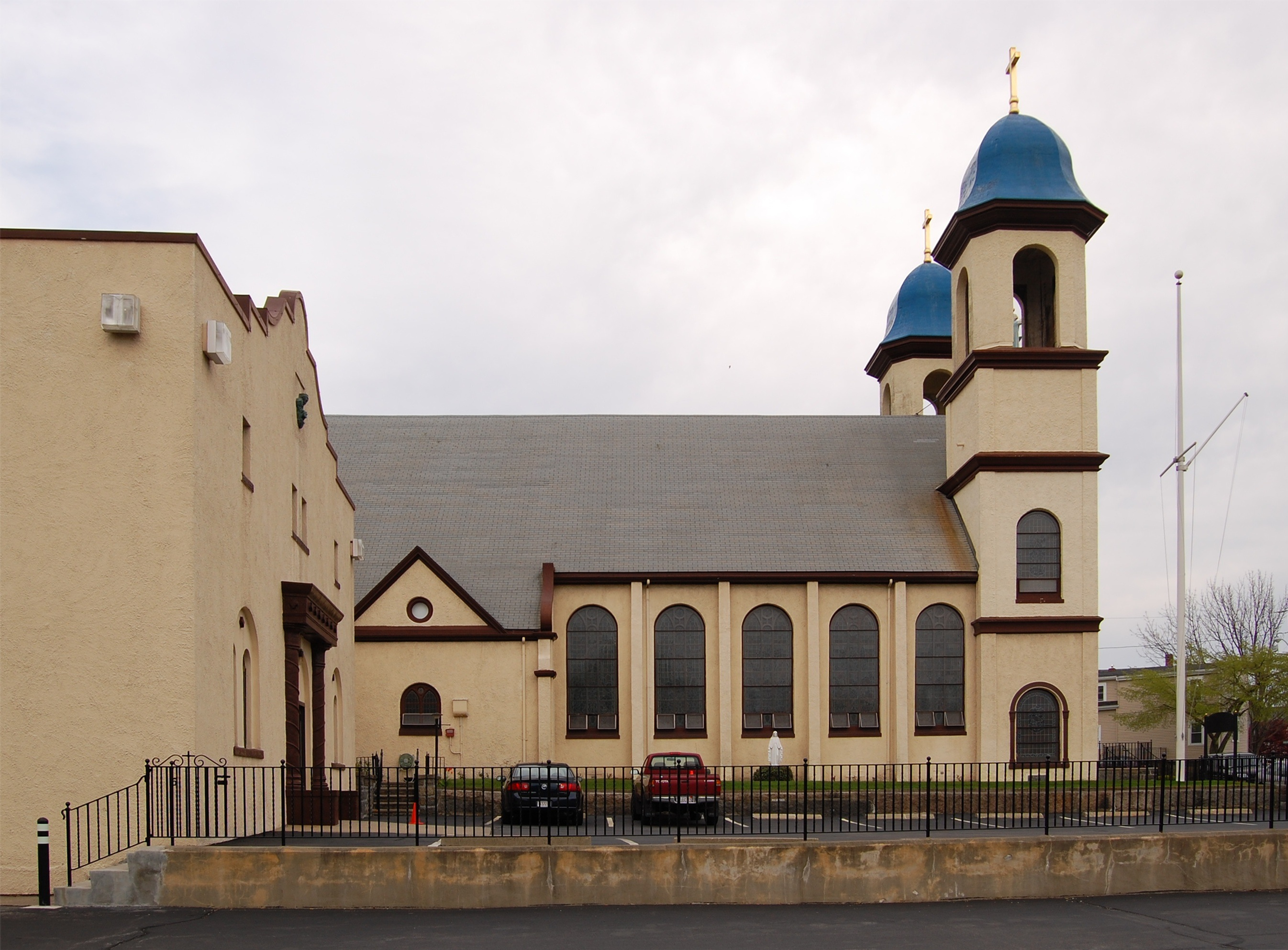

- Location within Massachusetts Location within the United States
- Location: Gloucester, Massachusetts
- Coordinates: 42°37′1″N 70°39′28″W
- Built: 1915
- Architect: Halfdan M. Hanson
- Architectural style: Mission/Spanish Revival
- NRHP reference No.: 90000706
- Added to NRHP: May 10, 1990

Our Lady of Good Voyage Church is a historic Roman Catholic church at 136-144 Prospect Street and 2-4 Taylor Street in Gloucester, Massachusetts. The first church on the site was built in 1892 to serve a large Portuguese immigrant population that came to Gloucester to work in the fishery. That church burned in 1914, and this Spanish Revival building, designed to resemble the Santa Maria Madalena church in the Azorean community of Madalena on the island of Pico. The church also includes one of the oldest sets of full carillon bells in the United States.

The church was listed on the National Register of Historic Places in 1990.

== See also ==
- National Register of Historic Places listings in Gloucester, Massachusetts
- National Register of Historic Places listings in Essex County, Massachusetts
- Igreja de Santa Maria Madalena (Madalena)
