= Building Adjudication Victoria Inc =

Not-for-profit organisation, Victoria, Australia

Building Adjudication Victoria Inc, is a not-for-profit organisation authorised by the Building Commission of Victoria, Australia, as a Nominating Authority under the Building and Construction Industry Security of Payment Act 2002.

Building Adjudication Victoria Inc is authorised by the Building Commission as a Nominating Authority for adjudicators and provides an independent panel of lawyers with experience and expertise in construction law to act as adjudicators in the resolution of disputes under the Building and Construction Industry Security of Payment Act 2002.

== Adjudication ==
Adjudication is a relatively new process introduced by the Victorian State Government to allow for the rapid determination of progress claims under building contracts or subcontracts and contracts for the supply of goods or services in the building industry. This process was designed to ensure cash flow to businesses in the building industry, without parties get tied up in lengthy and expensive litigation or arbitration. In addition to quick payment, the scheme also allows for the security of payment to be provided in lieu.

Adjudication is much quicker than litigation in a Court (an adjudicator’s determination must be made within 10 days of receipt of the application) and less expensive. An adjudicator’s determination is binding on the parties and can be recovered as a debt owing in a Court. The Building and Construction Industry Security of Payment Act 2002 is currently being reviewed by the State Government for reforms which may widen the scope of the Act within the building industry in Victoria.

== See also ==
- Australian Construction Contracts
