= List of acts of the Parliament of Victoria from 2025 =

This is a list of acts of the Parliament of Victoria, Australia for the year 2025.

== 2025 ==
Short title, or popular name	Citation	Royal assent
Long title
Drugs, Poisons and Controlled Substances Amendment (Paramedic Practitioners) Act 2025	No. 1 of 2025	11 February 2025
An Act to amend the Drugs, Poisons and Controlled Substances Act 1981 (Note: Drugs, Poisons and Controlled Substances Act 1981 (No. 9719)) to establish paramedic practitioners as a class of registered paramedics authorized to obtain, possess, use, sell and supply certain substances and for other purposes.
Education and Training Reform Amendment Act 2025	No. 2 of 2025	
Statute Law Repeals Act 2025 (repealed)	No. 3 of 2025	11 February 2025
An Act to repeal certain redundant or spent provisions in Acts. (Repealed by Statute Law Repeals Act 2025 (No. 3 of 2025))
Inquiries Amendment (Yoorrook Justice Commission Records and Other Matters) Act 2025	No. 4 of 2025	
Justice Legislation Amendment (Committals) Act 2025	No. 5 of 2025	
Consumer and Planning Legislation Amendment (Housing Statement Reform) Act 2025	No. 6 of 2025	
Family Violence Protection Amendment Act 2025	No. 7 of 2025	
Bail Amendment Act 2025	No. 8 of 2025	
Terrorism (Community Protection) and Control of Weapons Amendment Act 2025	No. 9 of 2025	
Help to Buy (Commonwealth Powers) Act 2025	No. 10 of 2025	
Justice Legislation Amendment (Anti-vilification and Social Cohesion) Act 2025	No. 11 of 2025	
Safe Patient Care (Nurse to Patient and Midwife to Patient Ratios) Amendment Act 2025	No. 12 of 2025	
Energy and Land Legislation Amendment (Energy Safety) Act 2025	No. 13 of 2025	
Regulatory Legislation Amendment (Reform) Act 2025	No. 14 of 2025	
Victorian Energy Efficiency Target Amendment (Energy Upgrades for the Future) Act 2025	No. 15 of 2025	
Fire Services Property Amendment (Emergency Services and Volunteers Fund) Act 2025	No. 16 of 2025	
Building Legislation Amendment (Buyer Protections) Act 2025	No. 17 of 2025	3 June 2025
An Act to amend the Building Act 1993, (Note: Building Act 1993 (No. 126 of 1993)) the Domestic Building Contracts Act 1995, (Note: Domestic Building Contracts and Tribunal Act 1995 (No. 91 of 1995)) the Sale of Land Act 1962, (Note: Sale of Land Act 1962 (No. 6975)) the Subdivision Act 1988 (Note: Subdivision Act 1988 (No. 53 of 1988)) and the Victorian Civil and Administrative Tribunal Act 1998 (Note: Victorian Civil and Administrative Tribunal Act 1998 (No. 53 of 1998)) and for other purposes.
Gambling Legislation Amendment (Pre-commitment and Carded Play) Act 2025	No. 18 of 2025	
Retirement Villages Amendment Act 2025	No. 19 of 2025	
Justice Legislation Amendment (Miscellaneous) Act 2025	No. 20 of 2025	
Appropriation (2025-2026) Act 2025	No. 21 of 2025	
Appropriation (Parliament 2025-2026) Act 2025	No. 22 of 2025	
Gambling Legislation Amendment Act 2025	No. 23 of 2025	
State Taxation Acts Amendment Act 2025	No. 24 of 2025	
Roads and Ports Legislation Amendment (Road Safety and Other Matters) Act 2025	No. 25 of 2025	
Transport Legislation Amendment (Vehicle Sharing Scheme Safety and Standards) Act 2025	No. 26 of 2025	
Workplace Injury Rehabilitation and Compensation Amendment Act 2025	No. 27 of 2025	
Corrections Legislation Amendment Act 2025	No. 28 of 2025	
Crimes Amendment (Performance Crime) Act 2025	No. 29 of 2025	
Financial Management Legislation Amendment Act 2025	No. 30 of 2025	
Local Jobs First Amendment Act 2025	No. 31 of 2025	
Superannuation Legislation Amendment Act 2025	No. 32 of 2025	
Worker Screening Amendment (Strengthening the Working with Children Check) Act 2025	No. 33 of 2025	
Bail Further Amendment Act 2025	No. 34 of 2025	
Wage Theft Amendment Act 2025	No. 35 of 2025	
Domestic Building Contracts Amendment Act 2025	No. 36 of 2025	16 September 2025
An Act to amend the Domestic Building Contracts Act 1995, the Building Act 1993, the Australian Consumer Law and Fair Trading Act 2012 (Note: Australian Consumer Law and Fair Trading Act 2012 (No. 21 of 2012)) and the Building Legislation Amendment (Buyer Protections) Act 2025 (Note: Building Legislation Amendment (Buyer Protections) Act 2025 (No. 17 of 2025)) and for other purposes.
Drugs, Poisons and Controlled Substances Amendment (Medication Administration in Residential Aged Care) Act 2025	No. 37 of 2025	
National Electricity (Victoria) Amendment (VicGrid Stage 2 Reform) Act 2025	No. 38 of 2025	
Australian Grands Prix Amendment Act 2025	No. 39 of 2025	
Casino and Gambling Legislation Amendment Act 2025	No. 40 of 2025	
Statute Law Revision Act 2025 (repealed)	No. 41 of 2025	21 October 2025
An Act to revise the statute law of Victoria. (Repealed by Statute Law Revision Act 2025 (No. 41 of 2025))
Domestic Animals Amendment (Rehoming Cats and Dogs and Other Matters) Act 2025	No. 42 of 2025	
Building Legislation Amendment (Fairer Payments on Jobsites and Other Matters) Act 2025	No. 43 of 2025	13 November 2025
An Act to amend the Building and Construction Industry Security of Payment Act 2002, (Note: Building and Construction Industry Security of Payment Act 2002 (No. 15 of 2002)) the Building Act 1993, the Environment Effects Act 1978, (Note: Environment Effects Act 1978 (No. 9135)) the Heritage Act 2017 (Note: Heritage Act 2017 (No. 7 of 2017)) and the Planning and Environment Act 1987 (Note: Planning and Environment Act 1987 (No. 45 of 1987)) and for other purposes.
Mental Health Legislation Amendment Act 2025	No. 44 of 2025	
Statewide Treaty Act 2025	No. 45 of 2025	13 November 2025
An Act to establish a First Peoples' representative and deliberative body named Gellung Warl, to amend the Advancing the Treaty Process with Aboriginal Victorians Act 2018 (Note: Advancing the Treaty Process with Aboriginal Victorians Act 2018 (No. 28 of 2018)) and the Treaty Authority and Other Treaty Elements Act 2022, (Note: Treaty Authority and Other Treaty Elements Act 2022 (No. 33 of 2022)) to consequentially amend other Acts and for other purposes.
Consumer Legislation Amendment Act 2025	No. 46 of 2025	
Parks and Public Land Legislation Amendment (Central West and Other Matters) Act 2025	No. 47 of 2025	
State Taxation Further Amendment Act 2025	No. 48 of 2025	
Victorian Early Childhood Regulatory Authority Act 2025	No. 49 of 2025	
Voluntary Assisted Dying Amendment Act 2025	No. 50 of 2025	25 November 2025
An Act to amend the Voluntary Assisted Dying Act 2017 (Note: Voluntary Assisted Dying Act 2017 (No. 61 of 2017)) to improve the experience of voluntary assisted dying, to consequentially amend other Acts and for other purposes.
Restricting Non-disclosure Agreements (Sexual Harassment at Work) Act 2025	No. 51 of 2025	2 December 2025
An Act to promote the health, safety and welfare of persons at work by regulating nondisclosure agreements relating to sexual harassment at work and for other purposes.
Crimes Amendment (Retail, Fast Food, Hospitality and Transport Worker Harm) Act 2025	No. 52 of 2025	
Early Childhood Legislation Amendment (Child Safety) Act 2025	No. 53 of 2025	
Justice Legislation Amendment (Community Safety) Act 2025	No. 54 of 2025	
Justice Legislation Amendment (Police and Other Matters) Act 2025	No. 55 of 2025	
Transport Legislation Amendment Act 2025	No. 56 of 2025	
Labour Hire Legislation Amendment (Licensing) Act 2025	No. 57 of 2025	16 December 2025
An Act to amend the Labour Hire Licensing Act 2018 (Note: Labour Hire Licensing Act 2018 (No. 25 of 2018)) in relation to the meaning of labour hire services, fit and proper persons, monitoring, investigation and enforcement powers and information sharing and the Workforce Inspectorate Victoria Act 2020 (Note: Wage Theft Act 2020 (No. 21 of 2020)) in relation to causing or threatening to cause detriment and for other purposes.
Social Services Regulation Amendment (Child Safety, Complaints and Worker Regulation) Act 2025	No. 58 of 2025	16 December 2025
An Act to amend the Child Wellbeing and Safety Act 2005, (Note: Child Wellbeing and Safety Act 2005 (No. 83 of 2005)) the Worker Screening Act 2020, (Note: Worker Screening Act 2020 (No. 34 of 2020)) the Social Services Regulation Act 2021, (Note: Social Services Regulation Act 2021 (No. 37 of 2021)) the Disability Service Safeguards Act 2018, (Note: Disability Service Safeguards Act 2018 (No. 38 of 2018)) the Disability Act 2006, (Note: Disability Act 2006 (No. 23 of 2006)) the Residential Tenancies Act 1997 (Note: Residential Tenancies Act 1997 (No. 109 of 1997)) and other Acts and for other purposes.

== Sources ==
- "Acts as made: 2025". Victoria Legislation.
