= List of acts of the Parliament of Victoria from 1978 =

This is a list of acts of the Parliament of Victoria, Australia for the year 1978.

== 1978 ==
Short title, or popular name	Citation	Royal assent
Long title
Aerial Spraying Control (Amendment) Act 1978	No. 9084	11 April 1978
An Act to amend Section 8 of the Aerial Spraying Control Act 1966. (Note: Aerial Spraying Control Act 1966 (No. 7403))
Dairy Products (Repeal) Act 1978	No. 9085	11 April 1978
An Act to repeal the Dairy Products Act 1958 (Note: Dairy Products Act 1958 (No. 6233)) and for other purposes.
Constitution Act 1978	No. 9087	11 April 1978
An Act to amend section 94 of the Constitution Act 1975 (Note: Constitution Act 1975 (No. 8750)) to increase the Amount Payable out of the Consolidated Fund for the Clerk and Expenses of the Executive Council.
Architects (Professional Conduct) Act 1978	No. 9089	11 April 1978
An Act to amend section 11 of the Architects Act 1958 (Note: Architects Act 1958 (No. 6201)) with respect to the Penalties which may be imposed on Persons who are guilty of Offences relating to the Professional Conduct of Architects.
Melbourne and Metropolitan Board of Works (Borrowing Powers Amendment) Act 1978	No. 9091	18 April 1978
An Act to deem Section 2 of the Melbourne and Metropolitan Board of Works (Borrowing Powers) Act 1977 (Note: Melbourne and Metropolitan Board of Works (Borrowing Powers) Act 1977 (No. 9030)) to have come into operation on the 18th day of October, 1977 and for other purposes.
Reference Areas Act 1978	No. 9093	18 April 1978
An Act to make further Provision with respect to the Management of certain Special Areas of Crown Land and for other purposes.
St. Andrew's Hospital Act 1978	No. 9097	9 May 1978
An Act to establish a Body Corporate under the name of St. Andrew's Hospital and for other purposes.
St. Andrew's Hospital (Guarantee) Act 1978	No. 9100	9 May 1978
An Act to authorize the Treasurer of Victoria to guarantee Repayment of certain Moneys proposed to be borrowed by St. Andrew's Hospital.
Supply (1978-79, No. 1) Act 1978	No. 9104	9 May 1978
An Act to make Interim Provision for the Appropriation of Moneys out of the Consolidated Fund for the Service of the Financial Year 1978-79.
Sandringham Land Act 1978	No. 9110	16 May 1978
An Act to authorize the Granting of Leases of certain Crown Land at Sandringham in the Parish of Moorabbin along Port Phillip Bay.
Railways (Legal Actions) Act 1978	No. 9113	16 May 1978
An Act to amend Division 11 of Part III. of the Railways Act 1958. (Note: Railways Act 1958 (No. 6355))
Stamps (Amendment) Act 1978 (repealed)	No. 9120	16 May 1978
An Act to amend the Stamps Act 1958 (Note: Stamps Act 1958 (No. 6375)) and the Motor Boating Act 1961. (Note: Motor Boating Act 1961 (No. 6832)) (Repealed by Statute Law Revision (Repeals) Act 1999 (No. 3 of 1999))
Melbourne University (Amendment) Act 1978	No. 9123	
An Act to amend the Melbourne University Act 1958 (Note: University Act 1958 (No. 6405)) and for other purposes.
State Development Decentralization and Tourism Act 1978	No. 9126	23 May 1978
An Act to establish a Department of State Development Decentralization and Tourism, to repeal the State Development Act 1970 (Note: State Development Act 1970 (No. 8081)) and for other purposes.
Melbourne and Metropolitan Board of Works (Rate Exemption) Act 1978	No. 9130	23 May 1978
An Act to amend Section 280 of the Melbourne and Metropolitan Board of Works Act 1958 (Note: Melbourne and Metropolitan Board of Works Act 1958 (No. 6310)) and for other purposes.
Mildura Irrigation and Water Trusts (Merbein) Act 1978 (repealed)	No. 9132	23 May 1978
An Act to amend the Mildura Irrigation and Water Trusts Act 1958, (Note: Mildura Irrigation and Water Trusts Act 1958 (No. 6316)) to re-constitute the Mildura Urban Water Trust, and for other purposes. (Repealed by Legislation Reform (Repeals No. 2) Act 2008 (No. 16 of 2008))
Environment Effects Act 1978	No. 9135	23 May 1978
An Act to require the Environmental Effects of certain Works to be assessed, and for other purposes.
Workers Compensation (Amendment) Act 1978	No. 9136	23 May 1978
An Act to amend the Workers Compensation Act 1958 (Note: Workers Compensation Act 1958 (No. 6419)) and for other purposes.
Railways (Amendment) Act 1978 (repealed)	No. 9142	30 May 1978
An Act to validate the Construction of certain Railways, to authorize the Dismantling of certain Railways and the Divesting of former Crown Land no longer required for Railway Purposes, to reduce the minimum Period for Entitlement to Payment in lieu of Long Service Leave to redundant Employés, to provide additional Powers for the Railway Construction Board, to amend Section 135 of the Railways Act 1958 and for Other purposes. (Repealed by Transport Act 1983 (No. 9921))
Dandenong Valley Authority (Amendment) Act 1978	No. 9144	30 May 1978
An Act to amend the Dandenong Valley Authority Act 1963 (Note: Dandenong Valley Authority Act 1963 (No. 7060)) and for other Purposes.
Post-Secondary Education Act 1978	No. 9145	30 May 1978
An Act to provide for the better Promotion, Development and Co-ordination of Post-Secondary Education in Victoria, to establish a Victorian Post-Secondary Education Commission, and for other purposes.
Physiotherapists Act 1978 (repealed)	No. 9147	30 May 1979
An Act to re-enact and amend the Law relating to the Registration of Physiotherapists and for other purposes. (Repealed by Physiotherapists Registration Act 1998 (No. 55 of 1998))
Magistrates' Courts (Amendment) Act 1978	No. 9152	30 May 1978
An Act to amend the Magistrates' Courts Act 1971 (Note: Magistrates' Courts Act 1971 (No. 8184)) and the Water Act 1958 (Note: Water Act 1958 (No. 6413)) with respect to the Civil Jurisdiction of Magistrates' Courts and for other purposes.
Chiropractors and Osteopaths Act 1978	No. 9161	30 May 1978
An Act to make Provision with respect to the Registration of Chiropractors and Osteopaths, and for other purposes.
Hospitals Remuneration Tribunal Act 1978	No. 9163	30 May 1978
An Act to make Provision for the Determination of the Terms and Conditions of Employment or Appointment of and the Salaries or Rates of Remuneration of certain Medical Practitioners and certain other Persons, to establish a Hospitals Remuneration Tribunal, to amend the Labour and Industry Act 1958 (Note: Labour and Industry Act 1958 (No. 6283)) and the Health Commission Act 1977 (Note: Health Commission Act 1977 (No. 9023)) and for other purposes.
Melbourne and Metropolitan Board of Works (Reconstitution) Act 1978	No. 9165	30 May 1978
An Act to provide for the Reconstitution of the Melbourne and Metropolitan Board of Works to amend the Melbourne and Metropolitan Board of Works Act 1958 in relation to that and other matters, and for other purposes.
Shrine of Remembrance Act 1978	No. 9167	3 October 1978
An Act to make Provision for the Care Management Maintenance and Preservation of the Shrine of Remembrance and other Memorials and for other purposes.
Dandenong Valley Authority (Recreational Areas and Environmental Areas) Act 1978	No. 9172	24 October 1978
An Act to make Provision with respect to the Removal and Disposal of certain Vehicles abandoned in Recreational Areas and Environmental Areas, to amend the Dandenong Valley Authority Act 1963 and for other purposes.
Victoria Law Foundation Act 1978	No. 9174	31 October 1978
An Act to amend the Constitution of the Victoria Law Foundation, to amend the Legal Profession Practice Act 1958 (Note: Legal Profession Practice Act 1958 (No. 6291)) and for other purposes.
Port of Melbourne Authority Act 1978	No. 9178	8 November 1978
An Act to constitute The Melbourne Harbor Trust Commissioners into the Port of Melbourne Authority, to amend the Melbourne Harbor Trust Act 1958, (Note: Melbourne Harbor Trust Act 1958 (No. 6312)) the Local Government Act 1958, (Note: Local Government Act 1958 (No. 6299)) the Marine Act 1958, (Note: Marine Act 1958 (No. 6302)) the Melbourne and Metropolitan Board of Works Act 1958, the Road Traffic Act 1958, (Note: Road Traffic Act 1958 (No. 6359)) the Navigable Waters (Oil Pollution) Act 1960, (Note: Navigable Waters (Oil Pollution) Act 1960 (No. 6705)) the Lower Yarra Crossing Authority Act 1965 (Note: Lower Yarra Crossing Authority Act 1965 (No. 7365)) and the Railways (Amendment) Act 1978 (Note: Railways (Amendment) Act 1978 (No. 9142)) in relation thereto and for other purposes.
Melbourne (Snowden Gardens) Land Act 1978	No. 9179	8 November 1978
An Act to amend the Melbourne (Snowden Gardens) Land Act 1975. (Note: Melbourne (Snowden Gardens) Land Act 1975 (No. 8685))
Surveyors Act 1978 (repealed)	No. 9180	21 November 1978
An Act to consolidate and amend the Law relating to Surveyors, to make certain consequential Amendments to various Acts and for other purposes.
Tocumwal Railway Extension (Supplementary Agreement Ratification) Act 1978 (repealed)	No. 9185	21 November 1978
An Act to ratify an Agreement between the State of New South Wales and the State of Victoria to fix permanently the Lifting Span in the Bridge at Tocumwal in the State of New South Wales. (Repealed by Transport Act 1983 (No. 9921))
Appropriation (1978-79, No. 1) Act 1978	No. 9186	28 November 1978
An Act to appropriate certain Sums out of the Consolidated Fund for the Service of the Financial Year 1978-79 and to appropriate the Supplies granted in this Session of Parliament and for other purposes.
Railways Act 1978 (repealed)	No. 9189	5 December 1978
An Act to amend the Railways Act 1958. (Repealed by Transport Act 1983 (No. 9921))
Land Tax Act 1978	No. 9190	5 December 1978
An Act to amend the Land Tax Act 1958, (Note: Land Tax Act 1958 (No. 6289)) and for other purposes.
Pay-roll Tax Act 1978	No. 9192	5 December 1978
An Act to alter the general exemption from Liability to Pay-roll Tax, to amend the Pay-roll Tax Act 1971 (Note: Pay-roll Tax Act 1971 (No. 8154)) and the Pay-roll Tax Act 1977 (Note: Pay-roll Tax Act 1977 (No. 9055)) and for other purposes.
Melbourne and Metropolitan Tramways (Bundoora Tramway) Act 1978 (repealed)	No. 9193	5 December 1978
An Act to authorize the Construction by the Melbourne and Metropolitan Tramways Board of an Electric Tramway in the City of Preston, the Shire of Diamond Valley, and the Shire of Whittlesea and for Purposes connected therewith. (Repealed by Transport Act 1983 (No. 9921))
Market Court Act 1978 (repealed)	No. 9196	5 December 1978
An Act to make Provision for the Constitution and Establishment of a Market Court, to confer Jurisdiction thereon and for other purposes. (Repealed by Fair Trading Act 1999 (No. 16 of 1999))
Consumer Affairs (Amendment) Act 1978 (repealed)	No. 9197	5 December 1978
An Act to amend the Consumer Affairs Act 1972 (Note: Consumer Protection Act 1972 (No. 8276)) and the Ministry of Consumer Affairs Act 1973. (Note: Ministry of Consumer Affairs Act 1973 (No. 8442)) (Repealed by Statute Law Revision (Repeals) Act 1999 (No. 3 of 1999))
Broiler Chicken Industry Act 1978	No. 9199	5 December 1978
An Act to establish a Victorian Broiler Industry Negotiation Committee and to improve Stability in the Broiler Chicken Industry, and for other purposes.
Racing (Amendment) Act 1978	No. 9201	5 December 1978
An Act to amend the Racing Act 1958. (Note: Racing Act 1958 (No. 6353))
Stamps Act 1978	No. 9208	12 December 1978
An Act to amend the Stamps Act 1958 and for other purposes.
Water Supply Works and Services Act 1978 (repealed)	No. 9209	12 December 1978
An Act to authorize Expenditure on Works and Services and other Purposes relating to Irrigation Water Supply Drainage Sewerage Flood Protection and River Improvement, and other purposes. (Repealed by Treasury Legislation (Repeal) Act 2005 (No. 73 of 2005))
Transport Works and Services Act 1978	No. 9210	12 December 1978
An Act to authorize Expenditure on Works and Services and other Purposes relating to Railways and Road Transport.
Constitution Act Amendment (Conduct of Elections) Act 1978	No. 9211	19 December 1978
An Act to amend The Constitution Act Amendment Act 1958. (Note: Constitution Act Amendment Act 1958 (No. 6224))
Crown Land (Reserves) Act 1978	No. 9212	19 December 1978
Art Act to provide for the Reservation of Crown Lands for certain purposes and for the Management of such Reserved Lands and for other purposes.
Wine Grape Processing Industry Act 1978	No. 9213	19 December 1978
An Act to improve Stability in the Wine Grape Processing Industry.
Constitution Act Amendment (Conjoint Elections) Act 1978	No. 9216	19 December 1978
An Act to amend The Constitution Act Amendment Act 1958 with respect to the Holding and Conduct of Conjoint Elections.
Country Fire Authority (Borrowing Powers) Act 1978	No. 9218	19 December 1978
An Act to amend the Country Fire Authority Act 1958 (Note: Country Fire Authority Act 1958 (No. 6228)) to increase Borrowing Powers of the Authority.
Members of Parliament (Register of Interests) Act 1978 or the Members of Parliament (Standards) Act 1978	No. 9223	19 December 1978
An Act to enact a Code of Conduct for Members of the Parliament of Victoria, to establish a Register of certain Interests of Members of that Parliament and for other purposes.
Charities Act 1978	No. 9227	19 December 1978
An Act to amend the Law relating to Charities and for other purposes.
Crimes (Criminal Damage) Act 1978 (repealed)	No. 9228	19 December 1978
An Act to consolidate and amend the Law relating to Malicious Injuries to Property, to amend the Crimes Act 1958 (Note: Crimes Act 1958 (No. 6231)) and the Magistrates' Courts Act 1971, to repeal certain Enactments and for other purposes. (Repealed by Statute Law Revision Act 2013 (No. 70 of 2013)
Crimes (Offences at Sea) Act 1978 (repealed)	No. 9229	19 December 1978
An Act relating to Offences committed at Sea and Matters connected therewith, to amend the Acts Interpretation Act 1958, (Note: Acts Interpretation Act 1958 (No. 6189)) and for other purposes. (Repealed by Crimes at Sea Act 1999 (No. 56 of 1999))
Domicile Act 1978	No. 9231	19 December 1978
An Act to abolish the Dependent Domicile of Married Women and otherwise to reform the Law relating to Domicile.
Administrative Law Act 1978	No. 9234	19 December 1978
An Act to make Provision with respect to the Review of certain Decisions made by certain Administrative Tribunals, and for other purposes.
Melbourne and Metropolitan Board of Works (Miscellaneous Amendments) Act 1978	No. 9235	19 December 1978
An Act to amend the Melbourne and Metropolitan Board of Works Act 1958 and for other purposes.
Melbourne and Metropolitan Board of Works (Trade Waste) Act 1978	No. 9239	19 December 1978
An Act to amend the Melbourne and Metropolitan Board of Works Act 1958 with respect to Trade Waste.
Health (Amendment) Act 1978 (repealed)	No. 9244	19 December 1978
An Act to amend the Health Act 1958 (Note: Health Act 1958 (No. 6270)) and for other purposes. (Repealed by Statute Law Revision (Repeals) Act 1999 (No. 3 of 1999))
Legal Aid Commission Act 1978	No. 9245	19 December 1978
An Act to establish a Legal Aid Commission and for other purposes.
Community Welfare Services Act 1978 (repealed)	No. 9248	19 December 1978
An Act to amend the Social Welfare Act 1970, (Note: Social Welfare Act 1970 (No. 8089)) the Education Act 1958, (Note: Education Act 1958 (No. 6240)) the Children's Court Act 1973 (Note: Children's Court Act 1973 (No. 8477)) and the Public Service Act 1974, (Note: Public Service Act 1974 (No. 8658)) to alter the Title of the first-mentioned Act, to establish a Department of Community Welfare Services and for other purposes. (Repealed by Statute Law (Further Revision) Act 2006 (No. 29 of 2006))
Victorian Brown Coal Council Act 1978 (repealed)	No. 9249	19 December 1978
An Act to constitute a Victorian Brown Coal Council, to make Provision for and with respect to the Evaluation of the Brown Coal Resources of Victoria, to undertake and promote Research into and the Development of the potential Uses of Brown Coal and for other purposes. (Repealed by State Electricity Commission (Coal Corporation of Victoria) Act 1984 (No. 10145))
Bail (Amendment) Act 1978	No.	
Ballarat (Children's Home) Land Act 1978	No.	
Building Industry Long Service Leave (Amendment) Act 1978	No.	
Cluster Titles (Amendment) Act 1978	No.	
Co-operation (Amendment) Act 1978	No.	
Co-operative Farmers and Graziers Direct Meat Supply Limited Act 1978	No.	
Co-operative Housing Societies (Amendment) Act 1978	No.	
Co-operative Housing Societies (Indemnities) Act 1978	No.	
Country Roads (Amendment) Act 1978	No.	
Country Roads (Borrowing Powers) Act 1978	No.	
Credit Reporting Act 1978	No.	
Crimes (Amendment) Act 1978	No.	
Crimes (Competence and Compellability of Spouse Witnesses) Act 1978	No.	
Crimes (Hijackings and Other Offences) Act 1978	No.	
Dental Technicians (Amendment) Act 1978	No.	
Dog (Amendment) Act 1978	No.	
Education (Amendment) Act 1978	No.	
Education (Further Amendment) Act 1978	No.	
Education (Work Experience for Handicapped Children) Act 1978	No.	
Educational Grants (Continuation) Act 1978	No.	
Egg Industry Stabilization (Amendment) Act 1978	No.	
Environment Protection (Amendment) Act 1978	No.	
Environment Protection (Noise Control) Act 1978	No.	
Evidence (Amendment) Act 1978	No.	
Fisheries (Amendment) Act 1978	No.	
Gas and Fuel Corporation (Borrowing Powers Amendment) Act 1978	No.	
Gas and Fuel Corporation (Municipal Rates) Act 1978	No.	
Geelong Regional Interim Development Order (Validation) Act 1978	No.	
Geelong Waterworks and Sewerage (Administration and Rates) Act 1978	No.	
Granya (Land Exchange) Act 1978	No.	
Health Commission (Amendment) Act 1978	No.	
Housing (Amendment) Act 1978	No.	
Judges Salaries Act 1978	No.	
Labour and Industry Act 1978	No.	
Land (Amendment) Act 1978	No.	
Legal Profession Practice (Amendment) Act 1978	No.	
Legal Profession Practice (Discipline) Act 1978	No.	
Legal Profession Practice (Solicitors' Disciplinary Tribunal) Act 1978	No.	
Lifts and Cranes (Amusement Structures) Act 1978	No.	
Liquor Control Act 1978	No.	
Local Government (Miscellaneous Provisions) Act 1978	No.	
Local Government (Municipal Districts) Act 1978	No.	
Local Government (Promotion of Decentralization) Act 1978	No.	
Local Government (Rates and Fees) Act 1978	No.	
Local Government (Regional Refuse Disposal) Act 1978	No.	
Magistrates (Interstate Enforcement) Act 1978	No.	
Magistrates' Courts (Stipendiary Magistrates) Act 1978	No.	
Marine (Amendment) Act 1978	No.	
Melbourne Harbor Trust (Borrowing Powers) Act 1978	No.	
Melbourne Underground Rail Loop (Borrowing Powers) Act 1978	No.	
Melbourne Wholesale Fruit and Vegetable Market Trust (Amendment) Act 1978	No.	
Melbourne Wholesale Fruit and Vegetable Market Trust (Licences) Act 1978	No.	
Mildura Irrigation and Water Trusts (Amendment) Act 1978	No.	
Mines (Miscellaneous Provisions) Act 1978	No.	
Ministry of Transport (Passenger Services) Act 1978	No.	
Molesworth (Land Exchange) Act 1978	No.	
Motor Car (Amendment) Act 1978	No.	
Motor Car (Fees and Penalties) Act 1978	No.	
Motor Car Act 1978	No.	
Motor Car Traders (Amendment) Act 1978	No.	
National Parks (Amendment) Act 1978	No.	
National Parks Act 1978	No.	
Parliamentary Salaries and Superannuation Act 1978	No.	
Petroleum (Amendment) Act 1978	No.	
Petroleum Products Subsidy (Amendment) Act 1978	No.	
Police Offences (Offensive Publications) Act 1978	No.	
Port of Melbourne (World Trade Centre) Act 1978	No.	
Pounds (Amendment) Act 1978	No.	
Probate Duty (Application) Act 1978	No.	
Public Records (Transfer of Administration) Act 1978	No.	
Public Service (Amendment) Act 1978	No.	
Public Works and Services Act 1978	No.	
Queenscliff Land Act 1978	No.	
Road Traffic (Amendment) Act 1978	No.	
Road Traffic Act 1978	No.	
Securities Industry (Amendment) Act 1978	No.	
Sewerage Districts (Amendment) Act 1978	No.	
Sewerage Districts (Transfer of Works) Act 1978	No.	
State Co-ordination Council (Amendment) Act 1978	No.	
State Electricity Commission (Amendment) Act 1978	No.	
State Forests Works and Services Act 1978	No.	
State Savings Bank (Amendment) Act 1978	No.	
Summary Offences (Amendment) Act 1978	No.	
Superannuation (Amendment) Act 1978	No.	
Teaching Service (Appointments) Act 1978	No.	
Teaching Service (Migrant Instructors) Act 1978	No.	
Town and Country Planning (Amendment) Act 1978	No.	
Town and Country Planning (Miscellaneous Provisions) Act 1978	No.	
Trustee (Authorized Investments) Act 1978	No.	
Trustee Companies (Amendment) Act 1978	No.	
Valuation of Land Act 1978	No.	
Vegetation and Vine Diseases (Parasites) Act 1978	No.	
Victoria Conservation Trust (Amendment) Act 1978	No.	
Victoria Conservation Trust Act 1978	No.	
Victorian Dairy Industry Authority (Amendment) Act 1978	No.	
Victorian Film Corporation (Amendment) Act 1978	No.	
Water (Amendment) Act 1978	No.	
Water Drainage Act 1978	No.	
Wheat Industry Stabilization (Amendment) Act 1978	No.	
Workers Compensation (Share Farmers) Act 1978	No.	
Workers Compensation (Special Provisions) Act 1978	No.	
Wrongs (Actions for Damages) Act 1978	No.	

== Sources ==
- "1978 Victorian Historical Acts". AustLII.
