= List of acts of the Parliament of Victoria from 2002 =

This is a list of acts of the Parliament of Victoria, Australia for the year 2002.

== 2002 ==
Short title, or popular name	Citation	Royal assent
Long title
Road Safety (Alcohol Interlocks) Act 2002 (repealed)	No. 1 of 2002	26 March 2002
An Act to amend the Road Safety Act 1986 (Note: Road Safety Act 1986 (No. 127 of 1986)) and the Sentencing Act 1991 (Note: Sentencing Act 1991 (No. 49 of 1991)) with respect to the use of alcohol interlocks as a condition of granting a driver licence or permit to certain disqualified drivers and for other purposes. (Repealed by Statute Law (Further Revision) Act 2006 (No. 29 of 2006))
Sentencing (Amendment) Act 2002 (repealed)	No. 2 of 2002	
(Repealed by Statute Law (Further Revision) Act 2006 (No. 29 of 2006))
Wildlife (Amendment) Act 2002 (repealed)	No. 3 of 2002	
(Repealed by Statute Law (Further Revision) Act 2006 (No. 29 of 2006))
Judicial Remuneration Tribunal (Amendment) Act 2002 (repealed)	No. 4 of 2002	
(Repealed by Statute Law (Further Revision) Act 2006 (No. 29 of 2006))
Water (Irrigation Farm Dams) Act 2002 (repealed)	No. 5 of 2002	
(Repealed by Statute Law (Further Revision) Act 2006 (No. 29 of 2006))
Water (Irrigation Farm Dams) (Amendment) Act 2002 (repealed)	No. 6 of 2002	
(Repealed by Statute Law (Further Revision) Act 2006 (No. 29 of 2006))
Forensic Health Legislation (Amendment) Act 2002 (repealed)	No. 7 of 2002	
(Repealed by Statute Law (Further Revision) Act 2006 (No. 29 of 2006))
Constitution (Governor's Salary) Act 2002 (repealed)	No. 8 of 2002	23 April 2002
An Act to amend section 7 of the Constitution Act 1975. (Note: Constitution Act 1975 (No. 8750)) (Repealed by Statute Law (Further Revision) Act 2006 (No. 29 of 2006))
Corporations (Financial Services Reform Amendments) Act 2002 (repealed)	No. 9 of 2002	23 April 2002
(Repealed by Statute Law (Further Revision) Act 2006 (No. 29 of 2006))
Electricity Industry (Amendment) Act 2002 (repealed)	No. 10 of 2002	23 April 2002
(Repealed by Statute Law (Further Revision) Act 2006 (No. 29 of 2006))
Statute Law (Further Revision) Act 2002 (repealed)	No. 11 of 2002	23 April 2002
An Act to revise further the Statute Law of Victoria. (Repealed by Statute Law (Further Revision) Act 2006 (No. 29 of 2006))
Jewish Care (Victoria) Act 2002	No. 12 of 2002	30 April 2002
An Act relating to Jewish Care (Victoria) Inc. and for other purposes.
Melbourne City Link (Further Miscellaneous Amendments) Act 2002 (repealed)	No. 13 of 2002	
(Repealed by Statute Law (Further Revision) Act 2006 (No. 29 of 2006))
Health Practitioner Acts (Further Amendments) Act 2002 (repealed)	No. 14 of 2002	
(Repealed by Statute Law (Further Revision) Act 2006 (No. 29 of 2006))
Building and Construction Industry Security of Payment Act 2002	No. 15 of 2002	14 May 2002
An Act to provide for entitlements to progress payments for persons who carry out construction work or who supply related goods and services under construction contracts and for other purposes.
Crimes (DNA Database) Act 2002 (repealed)	No. 16 of 2002	
(Repealed by Statute Law (Further Revision) Act 2006 (No. 29 of 2006))
Fisheries (Further Amendment) Act 2002 (repealed)	No. 17 of 2002	
(Repealed by Statute Law (Further Revision) Act 2006 (No. 29 of 2006))
National Crime Authority (State Provisions) (Amendment) Act 2002 (repealed)	No. 18 of 2002	
(Repealed by Statute Law (Further Revision) Act 2006 (No. 29 of 2006))
Racing Acts (Amendment) Act 2002 (repealed)	No. 19 of 2002	
(Repealed by Statute Law (Further Revision) Act 2006 (No. 29 of 2006))
Rail Corporations (Amendment) Act 2002 (repealed)	No. 20 of 2002	
(Repealed by Statute Law (Further Revision) Act 2006 (No. 29 of 2006))
Theatres (Repeal) Act 2002	No. 21 of 2002	21 May 2002
An Act to repeal the Theatres Act 1958, (Note: Theatres Act 1958 (No. 6393)) to amend the Anzac Day Act 1958 (Note: Anzac Day Act 1958 (No. 6198)) and for other purposes.
Casino (Management Agreement) (Amendment) Act 2002 (repealed)	No. 22 of 2002	
(Repealed by Statute Law (Further Revision) Act 2006 (No. 29 of 2006))
Electoral Act 2002	No. 23 of 2002	12 June 2002
An Act to re-enact with amendments the law relating to Victorian elections, to amend The Constitution Act Amendment Act 1958 (Note: Constitution Act Amendment Act 1958 (No. 6224)) and consequentially amend certain other Acts and for other purposes.
Energy Legislation (Further Miscellaneous Amendments) Act 2002 (repealed)	No. 24 of 2002	12 June 2002
(Repealed by Statute Law (Further Revision) Act 2006 (No. 29 of 2006))
House Contracts Guarantee (HIH Further Amendment) Act 2002 (repealed)	No. 25 of 2002	12 June 2002
(Repealed by Statute Law (Further Revision) Act 2006 (No. 29 of 2006))
Magistrates' Court (Amendment) Act 2002 (repealed)	No. 26 of 2002	12 June 2002
(Repealed by Statute Law (Further Revision) Act 2006 (No. 29 of 2006))
Magistrates' Court (Koori Court) Act 2002 (repealed)	No. 27 of 2002	12 June 2002
An Act to amend the Magistrates' Court Act 1989 (Note: Magistrates' Court Act 1989 (No. 51 of 1989)) to establish a Koori Court Division of the Magistrates' Court, to provide for the jurisdiction and procedure of that Division and for other purposes. (Repealed by Statute Law (Further Revision) Act 2006 (No. 29 of 2006))
Pathology Services Accreditation (Amendment) Act 2002 (repealed)	No. 28 of 2002	
(Repealed by Statute Law (Further Revision) Act 2006 (No. 29 of 2006))
State Taxation Acts (Further Tax Reform) Act 2002 (repealed)	No. 29 of 2002	
(Repealed by Statute Law (Further Revision) Act 2006 (No. 29 of 2006))
State Taxation Legislation (Further Amendment) Act 2002 (repealed)	No. 30 of 2002	
(Repealed by Statute Law (Further Revision) Act 2006 (No. 29 of 2006))
Tobacco (Miscellaneous Amendments) Act 2002 (repealed)	No. 31 of 2002	
(Repealed by Statute Law (Further Revision) Act 2006 (No. 29 of 2006))
Transport (Further Miscellaneous Amendments) Act 2002 (repealed)	No. 32 of 2002	
(Repealed by Statute Law (Further Revision) Act 2006 (No. 29 of 2006))
Appropriation (2002/2003) Act 2002	No. 33 of 2002	
Appropriation (Parliament 2002/2003) Act 2002	No. 34 of 2002	
Criminal Justice Legislation (Miscellaneous Amendments) Act 2002 (repealed)	No. 35 of 2002	
(Repealed by Statute Law (Further Revision) Act 2006 (No. 29 of 2006))
Domestic Building Contracts (Conciliation and Dispute Resolution) Act 2002 (repealed)	No. 36 of 2002	
(Repealed by Statute Law (Further Revision) Act 2006 (No. 29 of 2006))
Environment Protection (Resource Efficiency) Act 2002 (repealed)	No. 37 of 2002	
(Repealed by Statute Law (Further Revision) Act 2006 (No. 29 of 2006))
Gaming Legislation (Amendment) Act 2002 (repealed)	No. 38 of 2002	
(Repealed by Statute Law (Further Revision) Act 2006 (No. 29 of 2006))
Liquor Control Reform (Packaged Liquor Licences) Act 2002 (repealed)	No. 39 of 2002	
(Repealed by Statute Law (Further Revision) Act 2006 (No. 29 of 2006))
National Parks (Marine National Parks and Marine Sanctuaries) Act 2002 (repealed)	No. 40 of 2002	18 June 2002
An Act to amend the National Parks Act 1975, (Note: National Parks Act 1975 (No. 8702)) the Fisheries Act 1995 (Note: Fisheries Act 1995 (No. 92 of 1995)) and other Acts to provide for marine national parks and marine sanctuaries, to make further amendments to the National Parks Act 1975 and for other purposes. (Repealed by Statute Law (Further Revision) Act 2006 (No. 29 of 2006))
Guardianship and Administration (Amendment) Act 2002 (repealed)	No. 41 of 2002	
(Repealed by Statute Law (Further Revision) Act 2006 (No. 29 of 2006))
Agricultural Industry Development (Further Amendment) Act 2002 (repealed)	No. 42 of 2002	
(Repealed by Statute Law (Further Revision) Act 2006 (No. 29 of 2006))
Juries (Amendment) Act 2002 (repealed)	No. 43 of 2002	
(Repealed by Statute Law (Further Revision) Act 2006 (No. 29 of 2006))
Agriculture Legislation (Amendments and Repeals) Act 2002 (repealed)	No. 44 of 2002	
(Repealed by Statute Law (Further Revision) Act 2006 (No. 29 of 2006))
Residential Tenancies (Amendment) Act 2002 (repealed)	No. 45 of 2002	
(Repealed by Statute Law (Further Revision) Act 2006 (No. 29 of 2006))
Road Safety (Responsible Driving) Act 2002 (repealed)	No. 46 of 2002	
(Repealed by Statute Law (Further Revision) Act 2006 (No. 29 of 2006))
Sports Event Ticketing (Fair Access) Act 2002	No. 47 of 2002	22 October 2002
An Act to regulate the sale and distribution of tickets to certain sports events to ensure fair access to tickets and for other purposes.
Utility Meters (Metrological Controls) Act 2002	No. 48 of 2002	22 October 2002
An Act to enact trade measurement legislation in respect of utility meters, to consequentially amend the Water Act 1989 (Note: Water Act 1989 (No. 80 of 1989)) and for other purposes.
Wrongs and Other Acts (Public Liability Insurance Reform) Act 2002 (repealed)	No. 49 of 2002	
(Repealed by Statute Law (Further Revision) Act 2006 (No. 29 of 2006))
National Parks (Box-Ironbark and Other Parks) Act 2002 (repealed)	No. 50 of 2002	29 October 2002
An Act to amend the National Parks Act 1975 to create new parks and make further provision in relation to existing parks and other Crown land, to create new reserves under the Crown Land (Reserves) Act 1978, (Note: Crown Land (Reserves) Act 1978 (No. 9212)) to otherwise amend the Crown Land (Reserves) Act 1978, the Mineral Resources Development Act 1990, (Note: Mineral Resources Development Act 1990 (No. 92 of 1990)) the Reference Areas Act 1978 (Note: Reference Areas Act 1978 (No. 9093)) and the Forests Act 1958 (Note: Forests Act 1958 (No. 6254)) and for other purposes. (Repealed by Statute Law (Further Revision) Act 2006 (No. 29 of 2006))
Gas Industry (Residual Provisions) (Amendment) Act 2002 (repealed)	No. 51 of 2002	
(Repealed by Statute Law (Further Revision) Act 2006 (No. 29 of 2006))
Limitation of Actions (Amendment) Act 2002 (repealed)	No. 52 of 2002	
(Repealed by Statute Law (Further Revision) Act 2006 (No. 29 of 2006))
Regional Development Victoria Act 2002	No. 53 of 2002	
Transport (Highway Rule) Act 2002 (repealed)	No. 54 of 2002	4 November 2002
An Act to amend the Transport Act 1983 (Note: Transport Act 1983 (No. 9921)) and for other purposes. (Repealed by Statute Law (Further Revision) Act 2006 (No. 29 of 2006))

== Sources ==
- "Acts as made: 2002". Victoria Legislation.
