= List of acts of the Parliament of Victoria from 2026 =

This is a list of acts of the Parliament of Victoria, Australia for the year 2026.

== 2026 ==
Short title, or popular name	Citation	Royal assent
Long title
Justice Legislation Amendment (Family Violence, Stalking and Other Matters) Act 2026	No. 1 of 2026	10 February 2026
An Act to amend the Family Violence Protection Act 2008, (Note: Family Violence Protection Act 2008 (No. 52 of 2008)) the Crimes Act 1958, (Note: Crimes Act 1958 (No. 6231)) the Criminal Procedure Act 2009, (Note: Criminal Procedure Act 2009 (No. 7 of 2009)) the Evidence (Miscellaneous Provisions) Act 1958, (Note: Evidence Act 1958 (No. 6246)) the Jury Directions Act 2015 (Note: Jury Directions Act 2015 (No. 14 of 2015)) and the Personal Safety Intervention Orders Act 2010 (Note: Personal Safety Intervention Orders Act 2010 (No. 53 of 2010)) and for other purposes.
Mineral Resources (Sustainable Development) Amendment (Financial Assurance) Act 2026	No. 2 of 2026	10 February 2026
An Act to amend the Mineral Resources (Sustainable Development) Act 1990 (Note: Mineral Resources Development Act 1990 (No. 92 of 1990)) to introduce a trailing liabilities scheme and require notice of change in control of certain declared mine licensees and to make consequential amendments to that Act and the Mineral Resources (Sustainable Development) Amendment Act 2023 (Note: Mineral Resources (Sustainable Development) Amendment Act 2023 (No. 23 of 2023)) and for other purposes.
Planning Amendment (Better Decisions Made Faster) Act 2026	No. 3 of 2026	17 February 2026
An Act to amend the Planning and Environment Act 1987, (Note: Planning and Environment Act 1987 (No. 45 of 1987)) to make consequential amendments to the Land Acquisition and Compensation Act 1986, (Note: Land Acquisition and Compensation Act 1986 (No. 121 of 1986)) the Subordinate Legislation Act 1994 (Note: Subordinate Legislation Act 1994 (No. 104 of 1994)) and other Acts and for other purposes.
Health Safeguards for People Born with Variations in Sex Characteristics Act 2026	No. 4 of 2026	24 February 2026
An Act to provide support for the making of decisions about certain medical treatment for persons who have an innate variation in sex characteristics, including provisions about the giving of informed consent to the decisions, panels of persons who may give approvals about the decisions, prohibiting the medical treatment in certain circumstances and other related matters and to amend the Victorian Civil and Administrative Tribunal Act 1998 (Note: Victorian Civil and Administrative Tribunal Act 1998 (No. 53 of 1998)) to provide for review processes for those decisions and for other purposes.
Justice Legislation Amendment (Vicarious Liability for Child Abuse) Act 2026	No. 5 of 2026	24 February 2026
An Act to amend the Wrongs Act 1958 (Note: Wrongs Act 1958 (No. 6420)) in relation to vicarious liability for child abuse, to amend the Limitation of Actions Act 1958 (Note: Limitation of Actions Act 1958 (No. 6295)) in relation to setting aside certain settlements or judgments and for other purposes.
Children, Youth and Families Amendment (Stability) Act 2026	No. 6 of 2026	11 March 2026
An Act to amend the Children, Youth and Families Act 2005 (Note: Children, Youth and Families Act 2005 (No. 96 of 2005)) and for other purposes.
Children, Youth and Families Amendment (Supporting Stable and Strong Families) Act 2026	No. 7 of 2026	11 March 2026
An Act to amend the Children, Youth and Families Act 2005 to provide for responsibilities of supporting stable and strong families partners in relation to supporting stable and strong families and to consequentially amend the Child Wellbeing and Safety Act 2005 (Note: Child Wellbeing and Safety Act 2005 (No. 83 of 2005)) and for other purposes.
Crimes Amendment Act 2026	No. 8 of 2026	11 March 2026
An Act to amend the Crimes Act 1958 to make further provision in relation to who can commence a prosecution for an offence against section 195N(1) or 195O(1) of that Act and for other purposes.
Energy and Other Legislation Amendment (Resilience Reforms and Other Matters) Act 2026	No. 9 of 2026	11 March 2026
An Act to amend the Electricity Safety Act 1998, (Note: Electricity Safety Act 1998 (No. 25 of 1998)) the Electricity Industry Act 2000, (Note: Electricity Industry Act 2000 (No. 68 of 2000)) the Gas Industry Act 2001, (Note: Gas Industry Act 2001 (No. 31 of 2001)) the National Electricity (Victoria) Act 2005, (Note: National Electricity (Victoria) Act 2005 (No. 8 of 2025)) the Energy and Land Legislation Amendment (Energy Safety) Act 2025, (Note: Energy and Land Legislation Amendment (Energy Safety) Act 2025 (No. 13 of 2025)) the Victorian Energy Efficiency Target Amendment (Energy Upgrades for the Future) Act 2025, (Note: Victorian Energy Efficiency Target Amendment (Energy Upgrades for the Future) Act 2025 (No. 15 of 2025)) the National Electricity (Victoria) Amendment (VicGrid Stage 2 Reform) Act 2025 (Note: National Electricity (Victoria) Amendment (VicGrid Stage 2 Reform) Act 2025 (No. 38 of 2025)) and the Advancing the Treaty Process with Aboriginal Victorians Act 2018 (Note: Advancing the Treaty Process with Aboriginal Victorians Act 2018 (No. 28 of 2018)) and for other purposes.
National Gas (Victoria) Amendment Act 2026	No. 10 of 2026	24 March 2026
An Act to amend the National Gas (Victoria) Act 2008 (Note: National Gas (Victoria) Act 2008 (No. 30 of 2008)) and for other purposes.
Entities Legislation Amendment (Consolidation and Other Matters) Act 2026	No. 11 of 2026	31 March 2026
An Act to amend the Circular Economy (Waste Reduction and Recycling) Act 2021, (Note: Circular Economy (Waste Reduction and Recycling) Act 2021 (No. 55 of 2021)) the Environment Protection Act 2017, (Note: Environment Protection Act 2017 (No. 51 of 2017)) the Marine and Coastal Act 2018, (Note: Marine and Coastal Act 2018 (No. 26 of 2018)) the Commissioner for Environmental Sustainability Act 2003, (Note: Commissioner for Environmental Sustainability Act 2003 (No. 15 of 2003)) the Mineral Resources (Sustainable Development) Act 1990, the Public Administration Act 2004, (Note: Public Administration Act 2004 (No. 108 of 2004)) the Financial Management Act 1994, (Note: Financial Management Act 1994 (No. 18 of 1994)) the Mental Health and Wellbeing Act 2022, (Note: Mental Health and Wellbeing Act 2022 (No. 39 of 2022)) the Local Government Act 1989, (Note: Local Government Act 1989 (No. 11 of 1989)) the Essential Services Commission Act 2001, (Note: Essential Services Commission Act 2001 (No. 62 of 2001)) the Commercial Passenger Vehicle Industry Act 2017, (Note: Commercial Passenger Vehicle Industry Act 2017 (No. 35 of 2017)) the Accident Towing Services Act 2007, (Note: Accident Towing Services Act 2007 (No. 30 of 2007)) the Great Ocean Road and Environs Protection Act 2020 (Note: Great Ocean Road and Environs Protection Act 2020 (No. 19 of 2020)) and the Parliamentary Workplace Standards and Integrity Act 2024, (Note: Parliamentary Workplace Standards and Integrity Act 2024 (No. 27 of 2024)) to repeal the Victorian Environmental Assessment Council Act 2001 (Note: Victorian Environmental Assessment Council Act 2001 (No. 81 of 2001)) and the Road Safety Camera Commissioner Act 2011 (Note: Road Safety Camera Commissioner Act 2011 (No. 47 of 2011)) and to make consequential amendments to other Acts and for other purposes.
Education and Training Reform Amendment (Free TAFE Guarantee) Act 2026	No. 12 of 2026	14 April 2026
An Act to amend the Education and Training Reform Act 2006 (Note: Education and Training Reform Act 2006 (No. 24 of 2006)) in relation to the TAFE network, to guarantee the provision of certain courses of vocational education and training free of tuition fee, to provide for the TAFE Funding Guarantee and for other purposes.
Electoral Amendment Act 2026	No. 13 of 2026	14 April 2026
An Act to amend the Electoral Act 2002 (Note: Electoral Act 2002 (No. 23 of 2002)) and for other purposes.
Justice Legislation Further Amendment (Miscellaneous) Act 2026	No. 14 of 2026	14 April 2026
An Act to make miscellaneous amendments to the Fines Reform Act 2014, (Note: Fines Reform Act 2014 (No. 47 of 2014)) the Guardianship and Administration Act 2019, (Note: Guardianship and Administration Act 2019 (No. 13 of 2019)) the Infringements Act 2006, (Note: Infringements Act 2006 (No. 12 of 2006)) the Marine Safety Act 2010, (Note: Marine Safety Act 2010 (No. 65 of 2010)) the Open Courts Act 2013, (Note: Open Courts Act 2013 (No. 58 of 2013)) the Road Safety Act 1986, (Note: Road Safety Act 1986 (No. 127 of 1986)) the Coroners Act 2008, (Note: Coroners Act 2008 (No. 77 of 2008)) the Births, Deaths and Marriages Registration Act 1996, (Note: Births, Deaths and Marriages Registration Act 1996 (No. 43 of 1996)) the Crimes Act 1958 in relation to certain offences, the County Court Act 1958 (Note: County Court Act 1958 (No. 6230)) and the Sentencing Act 1991 (Note: Sentencing Act 1991 (No. 49 of 1991)) in relation to the operation of the Drug Court Division of the County Court, the Road Safety Act 1986 in relation to procedural matters in the Magistrates' Court, to make related amendments to certain other Acts and for other purposes.
Regulatory Legislation Amendment (Reform) Act 2026	No. 15 of 2026	14 April 2026
An Act to amend the Circular Economy (Waste Reduction and Recycling) Act 2021, the Competition Policy Reform (Victoria) Act 1995, (Note: Competition Policy Reform (Victoria) Act 1995 (No. 74 of 1995)) the Conservation, Forests and Lands Act 1987, (Note: Conservation, Forests and Lands Act 1987 (No. 41 of 1987)) the Environment Protection Act 2017, the Gas Industry Act 2001, the Grain Handling and Storage Act 1995, (Note: Grain Handling and Storage Act 1995 (No. 45 of 1995)) the Local Government Act 2020, (Note: Local Government Act 2020 (No. 9 of 2020)) the Spent Convictions Act 2021, (Note: Spent Convictions Act 2021 (No. 13 of 2021)) the Victorian Conservation Trust Act 1972, (Note: Victorian Conservation Trust Act 1972 (No. 8350)) the Workplace Injury Rehabilitation and Compensation Act 2013 (Note: Workplace Injury Rehabilitation and Compensation Act 2013 (No. 67 of 2013)) and the Accident Compensation Act 1985 (Note: Accident Compensation Act 1985 (No. 10191)) in relation to minor, technical and operational matters, to make statute law revision amendments to the Labour Hire Legislation Amendment (Licensing) Act 2025 (Note: Labour Hire Legislation Amendment (Licensing) Act 2025 (No. 57 of 2025)) and minor amendments to the Restricting Non-disclosure Agreements (Sexual Harassment at Work) Act 2025, (Note: Restricting Non-disclosure Agreements (Sexual Harassment at Work) Act 2025 (No. 51 of 2025)) the Fuel Emergency Act 1977 (Note: Fuel Emergency Act 1977 (No. 8976)) to confer a power on the Minister to direct persons to give the Minister information relating to the production, supply, distribution, sale, use or consumption of a fuel and create related offences and to increase the penalty for certain existing offences against that Act and for other purposes.
Safe Food Victoria Act 2026	No. 16 of 2026	14 April 2026
An Act to establish Safe Food Victoria and to provide for it to perform functions in regulating the Victorian food industry, to abolish Dairy Food Safety Victoria and PrimeSafe, to amend the Dairy Act 2000 (Note: Dairy Act 2000 (No. 37 of 2000)) to regulate foods that have not traditionally been produced or processed for human consumption in Victoria or that are produced or processed using new technologies, to make consequential and related amendments to the Dairy Act 2000, the Food Act 1984, (Note: Food Act 1984 (No. 10082)) the Meat Industry Act 1993, (Note: Meat Industry Act 1993 (No. 40 of 1993)) the Seafood Safety Act 2003 (Note: Seafood Safety Act 2003 (No. 24 of 2003)) and certain other Acts and for other purposes.
Building and Plumbing Administration and Enforcement Act 2026	No. 17 of 2026	19 May 2026
An Act to re-enact with amendments the law relating to the regulation of the building and plumbing industries, the enforcement of building and plumbing work standards and the discipline of building practitioners, plumbers and endorsed building engineers, to impose a levy in relation to building work requiring a building permit, to make consequential amendments to other Acts and for other purposes.
Cladding Safety Victoria Repeal Act 2026	No. 18 of 2026	19 May 2026
An Act to repeal the Cladding Safety Victoria Act 2020 (Note: Cladding Safety Victoria Act 2020 (No. 31 of 2020)) and abolish Cladding Safety Victoria, to make related amendments to the Building Act 1993 (Note: Building Act 1993 (No. 126 of 1993)) including in relation to the building permit levy, to consequentially amend the Public Administration Act 2004 and for other purposes.
Electoral Further Amendment Act 2026	No. 19 of 2026	9 June 2026
An Act to further amend the Electoral Act 2002 in relation to political donations, State funding and reporting requirements, to make consequential amendments to the Electoral Amendment Act 2026 (Note: Electoral Amendment Act 2026 (No. 13 of 2026)) and the Planning Amendment (Better Decisions Made Faster) Act 2026 (Note: Planning Amendment (Better Decisions Made Faster) Act 2026 (No. 3 of 2026)) and for other purposes.
Appropriation (2026-2027) Act 2026	No. 20 of 2026	10 June 2026
An Act for the appropriation of certain sums out of the Consolidated Fund for the ordinary annual services of the Government for the financial year 2026/2027 and for other purposes.
Appropriation (Parliament 2026-2027) Act 2026	No. 21 of 2026	23 June 2026
An Act for the appropriation of certain sums out of the Consolidated Fund for the Parliament in respect of the financial year 2026/2027 and for other purposes.
Building Legislation and Treasury Legislation (Tax Relief) Amendment Act 2026	No. 22 of 2026	23 June 2026
An Act to amend the Building Act 1993 in relation to emergency orders, building notices, building orders, decennial insurance, flood-prone areas and minor matters, the Building and Construction Industry Security of Payment Act 2002 (Note: Building and Construction Industry Security of Payment Act 2002 (No. 15 of 2002)) in relation to adjudicators, authorised nominating authorities and reviews of that Act, the Building Legislation Amendment (Buyer Protections) Act 2025 (Note: Building Legislation Amendment (Buyer Protections) Act 2025 (No. 17 of 2025)) in relation to the statutory insurance scheme, minimum financial requirements and minor matters, the Building Legislation Amendment (Fairer Payments on Jobsites and Other Matters) Act 2025 (Note: Building Legislation Amendment (Fairer Payments on Jobsites and Other Matters) Act 2025 (No. 43 of 2025)) in relation to minor matters, the Building and Plumbing Administration and Enforcement Act 2026 (Note: Building and Plumbing Administration and Enforcement Act 2026 (No. 17 of 2026)) in relation to Ministerial guidelines, flood-prone areas and minor matters, the Cladding Safety Victoria Repeal Act 2026 (Note: Cladding Safety Victoria Repeal Act 2026 (No. 18 of 2026)) in relation to a minor matter, the Sale of Land Act 1962 (Note: Sale of Land Act 1962 (No. 6975)) in relation to off-the-plan contracts and section 32 statements, the Water Act 1989 (Note: Water Act 1989 (No. 80 of 1989)) in relation to floodplain management, the Emergency Services and Volunteers Fund Act 2012 (Note: Fire Services Property Levy Act 2012 (No. 58 of 2012)) in relation to exemptions and offsets and the fixed charge on residential land, the Duties Act 2000 (Note: Duties Act 2000 (No. 79 of 2000)) in relation to the concession from duty for newly constructed dwellings and the Land Tax Act 2005 (Note: Land Tax Act 2005 (No. 88 of 2005)) in relation to the principal place of residence exemption and for other purposes.
Victoria Police Amendment (Police Reservists) Act 2026	No. 23 of 2026	23 June 2026
An Act to amend the Victoria Police Act 2013 (Note: Victoria Police Act 2013 (No. 81 of 2013)) in relation to police reservists, to consequentially amend the Firearms Act 1996 (Note: Firearms Act 1996 (No. 66 of 1996)) and for other purposes.
Dangerous Goods Transport Act 2026	No. 24 of 2026	4 August 2026
An Act to regulate the transport of dangerous goods by vessel on inland waters, by road or by rail, to promote public safety, to protect property and the environment from harm, to repeal the Dangerous Goods Act 1985 (Note: Dangerous Goods Act 1985 (No. 10189)) and for other purposes.
Education and Training Reform Amendment Act 2026	No. 25 of 2026	4 August 2026
An Act to amend the Education and Training Reform Act 2006 to strengthen Aboriginal recognition and self-determination across the early childhood education, school education, vocational education and training and adult, community and further education system, to require schools to develop policies to restrict student use of personal electronic devices during school hours and to improve the operation of that Act and to amend the Education and Care Services National Law Act 2010 (Note: Education and Care Services National Law Act 2010 (No. 69 of 2010)) to make a technical amendment in relation to the publication of information and for other purposes.
Health Legislation Amendment (Regulatory Reform) Act 2026	No. 26 of 2026	4 August 2026
An Act to amend the Assisted Reproductive Treatment Act 2008 (Note: Assisted Reproductive Treatment Act 2008 (No. 76 of 2008)) to require registered ART providers to comply with an approved accreditation scheme and to make amendments to provisions relating to the registration of registered ART providers and the inspection powers of the Secretary, the Non-Emergency Patient Transport and First Aid Services Act 2003 (Note: Non-Emergency Patient Transport Act 2003 (No. 69 of 2003)) to expand the scope of the regulation making power in relation to the incorporation of documents, the Public Health and Wellbeing Act 2008 (Note: Public Health and Wellbeing Act 2008 (No. 46 of 2008)) to amend provisions in relation to the registration of cooling tower systems and the Radiation Act 2005 (Note: Radiation Act 2005 (No. 62 of 2005)) in relation to the disposal of radiation sources and to create a regulatory scheme for the provision of financial assurances and for other purposes.
Occupational Health and Safety Amendment (Dangerous Goods) Act 2026	No. 27 of 2026	4 August 2026
An Act to amend the Occupational Health and Safety Act 2004 (Note: Occupational Health and Safety Act 2004 (No. 107 of 2004)) to regulate the handling, and activities involving the handling, of dangerous goods including security sensitive ammonium nitrate and explosives at workplaces and other places and for other purposes.
Electoral Amendment (Miscellaneous Matters) Act 2026	No. 28 of 2026	18 August 2026
An Act to amend the Electoral Act 2002 to remove group voting tickets from Legislative Council elections and to improve the operation of that Act and the electoral system of Victoria, to make consequential amendments and for other purposes.
Firearms Amendment Act 2026	No. 29 of 2026	18 August 2026
An Act to amend the Firearms Act 1996 to ensure the continuation of the firearm prohibition order scheme, to make further provision for the categorisation of firearms, to increase penalties for certain offences and to impose a citizenship requirement and a firearms background check requirement on the holding of a licence, to make consequential amendments to the Firearms Amendment Act 2018 (Note: Firearms Amendment Act 2018 (No. 2 of 2018)) and for other purposes.
Fishing, Hunting and Outdoor Victoria Act 2026	No. 30 of 2026	25 August 2026
An Act to establish Fishing, Hunting and Outdoor Victoria, to establish the Land and Aquatic Access Panel, to repeal the Game Management Authority Act 2014 (Note: Game Management Authority Act 2014 (No. 24 of 2014)) and the Victorian Fisheries Authority Act 2016, (Note: Victorian Fisheries Authority Act 2016 (No. 68 of 2016)) to make consequential amendments to other Acts and for other purposes.
Corrections Amendment Act 2026	No. 31 of 2026	1 September 2026
An Act to amend the Corrections Act 1986 (Note: Corrections Act 1986 (No. 117 of 1986)) to provide that a prisoner's right to be in the open air is subject to operational considerations, to provide for a review of the operation of certain amendments to that Act and to further provide for persons detained in police gaols and to validate certain actions taken without delegations in place between 29 April 2024 and 18 May 2026 and for other purposes.
Crimes Amendment (Recruitment of Children for Criminal Activity and Production Notices) Act 2026	No. 32 of 2026	1 September 2026
An Act to amend the Crimes Act 1958 in relation to recruitment of children to engage in criminal activity, to further amend that Act to establish a new process for requiring financial institutions to produce documents that are relevant to certain offences and for other purposes.
Racing Legislation Amendment (Entity Governance and Other Matters) Act 2026	No. 33 of 2026	1 September 2026
An Act to amend the Racing Act 1958 (Note: Racing Act 1958 (No. 6353)) and the Domestic Animals Act 1994, (Note: Domestic (Feral and Nuisance) Animals Act 1994 (No. 81 of 1994)) to amend the Australian Grands Prix Act 1994 (Note: Australian Grand Prix Act 1994 (No. 68 of 1994)) in relation to approved motor sport events under that Act and for other purposes.
Safe Patient Care (Nurse to Patient and Midwife to Patient Ratios) Amendment Act 2026	No. 34 of 2026	1 September 2026
An Act to amend the Safe Patient Care (Nurse to Patient and Midwife to Patient Ratios) Act 2015 (Note: Safe Patient Care (Nurse to Patient and Midwife to Patient Ratios) Act 2015 (No. 51 of 2015)) to categorise or recategorise certain hospitals for the purposes of nurse to patient and midwife to patient ratios and for other purposes.
Workplace Protection Orders Act 2026	No. 35 of 2026	1 September 2026
An Act to provide for orders, to be made by the Magistrates' Court or the Children's Court, that impose restrictions on persons who engage in unacceptable conduct that is connected to certain workplaces and to make consequential amendments to the Children, Youth and Families Act 2005 and the Magistrates' Court Act 1989 (Note: Magistrates' Court Act 1989 (No. 51 of 1989)) and for other purposes.
Consumer Legislation Amendment Act 2026	No. 36 of 2026	8 September 2026
An Act to amend the Australian Consumer Law and Fair Trading Act 2012 (Note: Australian Consumer Law and Fair Trading Act 2012 (No. 21 of 2012)) in relation to forfeiture, seizure and debt collection, the Conveyancers Act 2006 (Note: Conveyancers Act 2006 (No. 75 of 2006)) in relation to the suspension of licences, the Domestic Building Contracts Act 1995 (Note: Domestic Building Contracts and Tribunal Act 1995 (No. 91 of 1995)) in relation to certain agreements to vary domestic building contracts, the Estate Agents Act 1980 (Note: Estate Agents Act 1980 (No. 9428)) in relation to the suspension of licences and the sale of residential properties, the Owners Corporations Act 2006 (Note: Owners Corporations Act 2006 (No. 69 of 2006)) in relation to payment plans, proceedings and proxy voting, the Residential Tenancies Act 1997 (Note: Residential Tenancies Act 1997 (No. 109 of 1997)) in relation to persons subjected to family violence and personal violence, compensation, keys and security devices, bonds and Part 4A parks, the Retirement Villages Act 1986 (Note: Retirement Villages Act 1986 (No. 126 of 1986)) in relation to the release of entry payments, the Sale of Land Act 1962 in relation to section 32 statements and deposit moneys and off-the-plan contracts, the Subdivision Act 1988 (Note: Subdivision Act 1988 (No. 53 of 1988)) in relation to applications to VCAT, the Tobacco Act 1987 (Note: Tobacco Act 1987 (No. 81 of 1987)) in relation to powers to close premises, powers and penalties for commercial landlords and the forfeiture and destruction of illicit tobacco, the Motor Car Traders Act 1986 (Note: Motor Car Traders Act 1986 (No. 104 of 1986)) in relation to the administration of the Motor Car Traders' Guarantee Fund, warranty periods, licences, record keeping and the sale of used motor cars, the Building Act 1993 in relation to developer bonds, the Building Act 1993 in relation to prefabrication work and prefabrication builders, the Building Act 1993 in relation to complex plumbing work, the Building Act 1993 and the Building and Plumbing Administration and Enforcement Act 2026 in relation to minor matters, the Domestic Building Contracts Amendment Act 2025 (Note: Domestic Building Contracts Amendment Act 2025 (No. 36 of 2025)) in relation to its commencement, certain other Acts and for other purposes.
Energy and Resources Legislation Amendment (VEET Strategic Review and Other Matters) Act 2026	No. 37 of 2026	8 September 2026
An Act to amend the Victorian Energy Efficiency Target Act 2007 (Note: Victorian Energy Efficiency Target Act 2007 (No. 70 of 2007)) to support the operation of the Victorian Energy Upgrades program and to make amendments consequential to the renaming of that Act, to amend the Mineral Resources (Sustainable Development) Act 1990, the Electricity Industry Act 2000, the Gas Industry Act 2001 and other Acts and for other purposes.
Education and Training Reform Amendment (Apprenticeships, Traineeships, Schools and Other Matters) Act 2026	No. 38 of 2026	15 September 2026
An Act to amend the Education and Training Reform Act 2006 to provide for a new regulatory scheme for apprenticeships and traineeships and in relation to the permission to teach scheme and school community safety orders and to amend the Workforce Inspectorate Victoria Act 2020 (Note: Wage Theft Act 2020 (No. 21 of 2020)) to provide for the appointment, functions and powers of the Apprenticeship and Traineeship Commissioner and for other purposes.
Fair Work (Commonwealth Powers) Amendment Act 2026	No. 39 of 2026	15 September 2026
An Act to amend the Fair Work (Commonwealth Powers) Act 2009 (Note: Fair Work (Commonwealth Powers) Act 2009 (No. 24 of 2009)) and the Victoria Police Act 2013 and for other purposes.
Multicultural Victoria Amendment (Multicultural and Multifaith Victoria) Act 2026	No. 40 of 2026	15 September 2026
An Act to amend the Multicultural Victoria Act 2011 (Note: Multicultural Victoria Act 2011 (No. 14 of 2011)) to establish Multicultural and Multifaith Victoria, to require certain public sector entities to acquire interpreting and translating services from VITS LanguageLoop and for other purposes.
Justice Legislation Amendment (Family Violence, Coercive Control, Good Character, Risk Assessment and Other Matters) Act 2026	No. 41 of 2026	22 September 2026
An Act to amend the Crimes Act 1958, the Criminal Procedure Act 2009, the Equal Opportunity Act 2010, (Note: Equal Opportunity Act 2010 (No. 16 of 2010)) the Family Violence Protection Act 2008, the Fines Reform Act 2014, the Infringements Act 2006, the National Domestic Violence Order Scheme Act 2016, (Note: National Domestic Violence Order Scheme Act 2016 (No. 53 of 2016)) the Personal Safety Intervention Orders Act 2010, the Road Safety Act 1986, the Sentencing Act 1991, the Summary Offences Act 1966 (Note: Summary Offences Act 1966 (No. 7405)) and the Youth Justice Act 2024 (Note: Youth Justice Act 2024 (No. 32 of 2024)) and for other purposes.
Local Government Legislation Amendment (Stronger Communities) Act 2026	No. 42 of 2026	29 September 2026
An Act to amend the Local Government Act 2020 to enhance the integrity and governance standards of Councils, to enable the prescription of a Fair Jobs Code and to make provision for the appointment of a Local Government Fair Jobs Code Regulator and to amend the City of Melbourne Act 2001 (Note: City of Melbourne Act 2001 (No. 5 of 2001)) to remove group voting tickets from the election of Councillors, to increase the permitted ratio between the lowest and highest differential rates if the Melbourne City Council uses the net annual value system of valuation, to enable a vacancy in the office of Deputy Lord Mayor to be filled by appointment, to reduce entitlement to be enrolled on the voters' roll without application and for other purposes.
Independent Broad-based Anti-corruption Commission Amendment Act 2026	No. 43 of 2026	1 October 2026
An Act to amend the Independent Broad-based Anti-corruption Commission Act 2011 (Note: Independent Broad-based Anti-corruption Commission Act 2011 (No. 66 of 2011)) to broaden the concept of corrupt conduct and enhance the IBAC's ability to follow the money, to make consequential amendments to the Public Interest Disclosures Act 2012 (Note: Protected Disclosure Act 2012 (No. 85 of 2012)) and for other purposes.
Inquiries Amendment (Special Prosecutor) Act 2026	No. 44 of 2026	1 October 2026
An Act to amend the Inquiries Act 2014 (Note: Inquiries Act 2014 (No. 67 of 2014)) to establish a Special Prosecutor to assist the Construction Royal Commission, to strengthen a Royal Commission's power to require information and for other purposes.
Workplace Legislation Amendment (Accident Compensation and Other Matters) Act 2026	No. 45 of 2026	1 October 2026
An Act to amend the Dangerous Goods Transport Act 2026 (Note: Dangerous Goods Transport Act 2026 (No. 24 of 2026)) in relation to reckless endangerment offences, the Workplace Injury Rehabilitation and Compensation Act 2013, the Accident Compensation Act 1985, the Transport Accident Act 1986 (Note: Transport Accident Act 1986 (No. 111 of 1986)) in relation to supported accommodation and certain benefits for children, the Occupational Health and Safety Act 2004, the Limitation of Actions Act 1958 to remove a limitation period for certain actions and to make consequential and related amendments to the Occupational Health and Safety Amendment (Dangerous Goods) Act 2026 (Note: Occupational Health and Safety Amendment (Dangerous Goods) Act 2026 (No. 27 of 2026)) and for other purposes.

== Sources ==
- "Acts as made: 2026". Victoria Legislation.
