= List of acts of the Parliament of Victoria from 2005 =

This is a list of acts of the Parliament of Victoria, Australia for the year 2005.

== 2005 ==
Short title, or popular name	Citation	Royal assent
Long title
Serious Sex Offenders Monitoring Act 2005 (repealed)	No. 1 of 2005	1 March 2005
An Act to enhance the protection of the community by requiring offenders who have served custodial sentences for certain sexual offences and who are a serious danger to the community to be subject to ongoing supervision while in the community, to amend the Corrections Act 1986 (Note: Corrections Act 1986 (No. 117 of 1986)) and the Sentencing Act 1991 (Note: Sentencing Act 1991 (No. 49 of 1991)) and for other purposes. (Repealed by Serious Sex Offenders (Detention and Supervision) Act 2009 (No. 91 of 2009))
Corrections (Transition Centres and Custodial Community Permits) Act 2005	No. 2 of 2005	
Courts Legislation (Judicial Appointments and Other Amendments) Act 2005	No. 3 of 2005	
Retirement Villages (Amendment) Act 2005	No. 4 of 2005	
Water Efficiency Labelling and Standards Act 2005	No. 5 of 2005	
Classification (Publications, Films and Computer Games) (Enforcement) (Amendment) Act 2005	No. 6 of 2005	
Geothermal Energy Resources Act 2005	No. 7 of 2005	27 April 2005
An Act to facilitate and regulate geothermal energy exploration and extraction in Victoria, to amend the Petroleum (Submerged Lands) Act 1982 (Note: Petroleum (Submerged Lands) Act 1982 (No. 9772)) and for other purposes.
National Electricity (Victoria) Act 2005	No. 8 of 2005	27 April 2005
An Act to make provision for the operation of the national electricity market, to repeal the National Electricity (Victoria) Act 1997, (Note: National Electricity (Victoria) Act 1997 (No. 29 of 1997)) to amend the Electricity Industry Act 2000, (Note: Electricity Industry Act 2000 (No. 68 of 2000)) the Electricity Industry (Residual Provisions) Act 1993 (Note: Electricity Industry Act 1993 (No. 130 of 1993)) and the Interpretation of Legislation Act 1984 (Note: Interpretation of Legislation Act 1984 (No. 10096)) and for other purposes.
Outworkers (Improved Protection) (Amendment) Act 2005	No. 9 of 2005	27 April 2005
Statute Law Revision Act 2005	No. 10 of 2005	27 April 2005
An Act to revise the statute law of Victoria.
Charities (Amendment) Act 2005	No. 11 of 2005	
Health (Compulsory Testing) Act 2005	No. 12 of 2005	
Land (Revocation of Reservations) Act 2005	No. 13 of 2005	
Mitcham-Frankston Project (Amendment) Act 2005	No. 14 of 2005	
Sentencing (Further Amendment) Act 2005	No. 15 of 2005	
Courts Legislation (Judicial Conduct) Act 2005	No. 16 of 2005	
Justice Legislation (Amendment) Act 2005	No. 17 of 2005	
Legal Profession (Consequential Amendments) Act	No. 18 of 2005	
Magistrates' Court (Judicial Registrars and Court Rules) Act 2005	No. 19 of 2005	
Parliamentary Administration Act 2005	No. 20 of 2005	24 May 2005
An Act to provide a framework for good governance in the administration of the Parliament of Victoria, to repeal the Parliamentary Officers Act 1975, (Note: Parliamentary Officers Act 1975 (No. 8730)) to amend the Constitution Act 1975, (Note: Constitution Act 1975 (No. 8750)) the Long Service Leave Act 1992, (Note: Employee Relations Act 1992 (No. 83 of 1992)) the Parliamentary Committees Act 2003, (Note: Parliamentary Committees Act 2003 (No. 110 of 2003)) the Public Administration Act 2004, (Note: Public Administration Act 2004 (No. 108 of 2004)) the Terrorism (Community Protection) Act 2003 (Note: Terrorism (Community Protection) Act 2003 (No. 7 of 2003)) and certain other Acts and for other purposes.
Children and Young Persons (Miscellaneous Amendments) Act 2005 (repealed)	No. 21 of 2005	
(Repealed by Legislation Reform (Repeals No. 3) Act 2008 (No. 53 of 2008))
Gambling Regulation (Public Lottery Licences) Act 2005 (repealed)	No. 22 of 2005	
(Repealed by Legislation Reform (Repeals No. 3) Act 2008 (No. 53 of 2008))
Long Service Leave (Amendment) Act 2005	No. 23 of 2005	
Road Safety (Further Amendment) Act 2005	No. 24 of 2005	
Transport Legislation (Further Amendment) Act 2005	No. 25 of 2005	
Appropriation (2005/2006) Act 2005 (repealed)	No. 26 of 2005	21 June 2005
An Act for the appropriation of certain sums out of the Consolidated Fund for the ordinary annual services of the Government for the financial year 2005/2006 and for other purposes. (Repealed by Legislation Reform (Repeals No. 3) Act 2008 (No. 53 of 2008))
Appropriation (Parliament 2005/2006) Act 2005 (repealed)	No. 27 of 2005	21 June 2005
An Act for the appropriation of certain sums out of the Consolidated Fund for the Parliament in respect of the financial year 2005/2006 and for other purposes. (Repealed by Legislation Reform (Repeals No. 3) Act 2008 (No. 53 of 2008))
Accident Compensation (Amendment) Act 2005	No. 28 of 2005	
City of Melbourne (Amendment) Act 2005	No. 29 of 2005	
Courts Legislation (Miscellaneous Amendments) Act 2005	No. 30 of 2005	
Dangerous Goods and Equipment (Public Safety) Acts (Amendment) Act 2005	No. 31 of 2005	
Emergency Services Superannuation (Amendment) Act 2005	No. 32 of 2005	
Energy Legislation (Miscellaneous Amendments) Act 2005	No. 33 of 2005	
Sex Offenders Registration (Amendment) Act 2005	No. 34 of 2005	
National Parks (Alpine National Park Grazing) Act	No. 35 of 2005	
State Taxation Acts (General Amendment) Act 2005	No. 36 of 2005	
Commonwealth Games Arrangements (Miscellaneous Amendments) Act 2005	No. 37 of 2005	
Electoral Legislation (Further Amendment) Act 2005	No. 38 of 2005	
Energy Safe Victoria Act 2005	No. 39 of 2005	
Higher Education Acts (Amendment) Act 2005	No. 40 of 2005	
Local Government (Amendment) Act 2005	No. 41 of 2005	
Health Legislation (Miscellaneous Amendments) Act 2005	No. 42 of 2005	
National Parks (Point Nepean) Act 2005	No. 43 of 2005	
Planning and Environment (Williamstown Shipyard) Act 2005	No. 44 of 2005	
Tobacco (Amendment) Act 2005 (repealed)	No. 45 of 2005	
(Repealed by Legislation Reform (Repeals No. 3) Act 2008 (No. 53 of 2008))
Accident Compensation and Transport Accident Acts (Ombudsman) Act 2005	No. 46 of 2005	
Casino Control (Amendment) Act 2005	No. 47 of 2005	
Environment and Water Legislation (Miscellaneous Amendments) Act 2005	No. 48 of 2005	
Owner Drivers and Forestry Contractors Act 2005	No. 49 of 2005	
Primary Industries Acts (Amendment) Act 2005	No. 50 of 2005	
Victoria State Emergency Service Act 2005	No. 51 of 2005	24 August 2005
An Act to establish the Victoria State Emergency Service Authority, to re-enact with amendments the Victoria State Emergency Service Act 1987, (Note: Victoria State Emergency Service Act 1987 (No. 57 of 1987)) to amend the Country Fire Authority Act 1958 (Note: Country Fire Authority Act 1958 (No. 6228)) and the Metropolitan Fire Brigades Act 1958, (Note: Metropolitan Fire Brigades Act 1958 (No. 6315)) to make consequential amendments to certain other Acts and for other purposes.
House Contracts Guarantee (Amendment) Act 2005	No. 52 of 2005	
Local Government (Further Amendment) Act 2005	No. 53 of 2005	
Melbourne College of Divinity (Amendment) Act 2005	No. 54 of 2005	13 September 2005
An Act to amend the Melbourne College of Divinity Act 1910 (Note: Melbourne College of Divinity Act 1910 (1 Geo. V. No. 2275)) to make further provision for the governance and operation of the College and for other purposes.
Racing and Gaming Acts (Police Powers) Act 2005	No. 55 of 2005	13 September 2005
Vagrancy (Repeal) and Summary Offences (Amendment) Act 2005	No. 56 of 2005	13 September 2005
Working with Children Act 2005	No. 57 of 2005	13 September 2005
An Act to assist in protecting children from sexual or physical harm by ensuring that people who work with, or care for, them have their suitability to do so checked by a government body, to amend the Sentencing Act 1991, the Sex Offenders Registration Act 2004, (Note: Sex Offenders Registration Act 2004 (No. 56 of 2004)) the Victorian Civil and Administrative Tribunal Act 1998 (Note: Victorian Civil and Administrative Tribunal Act 1998 (No. 53 of 1998)) and the Victorian Institute of Teaching Act 2001 (Note: Victorian Institute of Teaching Act 2001 (No. 96 of 2001)) and for other purposes.
Fisheries (Abalone) Act 2005	No. 58 of 2005	
Land (Miscellaneous Matters) Act 2005	No. 59 of 2005	
National Parks (Otways and Other Amendments) Act 2005	No. 60 of 2005	
Pipelines Act 2005	No. 61 of 2005	20 September 2005
An Act to re-enact with amendments the laws relating to the construction and operation of pipelines in Victoria, to repeal the Pipelines Act 1967 (Note: Pipelines Act 1967 (No. 7541)) and for other purposes.
Radiation Act 2005	No. 62 of 2005	20 September 2005
An Act to protect the health and safety of persons and the environment from the harmful effects of radiation, to make consequential amendments to the Health Act 1958, (Note: Health Act 1958 (No. 6270)) the Dangerous Goods Act 1985, (Note: Dangerous Goods Act 1985 (No. 10189)) the Environment Protection Act 1970, (Note: Environment Protection Act 1970 (No. 8056)) the Magistrates' Court Act 1989, (Note: Magistrates' Court Act 1989 (No. 51 of 1989)) the Nuclear Activities (Prohibitions) Act 1983, (Note: Nuclear Activities (Prohibitions) Act 1983 (No. 9923)) the Road Transport (Dangerous Goods) Act 1995 (Note: Road Transport (Dangerous Goods) Act 1995 (No. 84 of 1995)) and for other purposes.
Residential Tenancies (Further Amendment) Act 2005	No. 63 of 2005	20 September 2005
Royal Victorian Institute for the Blind and other Agencies (Merger) Act 2005	No. 64 of 2005	20 September 2005
An Act to provide that certain bequests, gifts, dispositions and trusts have effect as if made or declared to or in favour of Vision Australia Limited and for other purposes.
Sustainability Victoria Act 2005	No. 65 of 2005	
Crimes (Contamination of Goods) Act 2005	No. 66 of 2005	
Melbourne Lands (Yarra River North Bank) (Amendment) Act 2005	No. 67 of 2005	
Sentencing and Mental Health Acts (Amendment) Act 2005	No. 69 (Note: There was no act numbered 68 in 2005.) of 2005	
Sports Anti-doping Act 2005	No. 70 of 2005	11 October 2005
An Act to re-enact with amendments the law relating to anti-doping in sport, to confer functions on the Australian Sports Drug Agency, to repeal the Sports Drug Testing Act 1995 (Note: Sports Drug Testing Act 1995 (No. 3 of 1995)) and for other purposes.
Property (Co-ownership) Act 2005	No. 71 of 2005	
Treasury Legislation (Miscellaneous Amendments) Act 2005	No. 72 of 2005	
Treasury Legislation (Repeal) Act 2005	No. 73 of 2005	25 October 2005
An Act to repeal various redundant Acts, to repeal redundant provisions from the Gas Industry (Residual Provisions) Act 1994 (Note: Gas Industry Act 1994 (No. 112 of 1994)) and to make consequential amendments to that Act and other Acts and for other purposes.
Congestion Levy Act 2005	No. 74 of 2005	
Defamation Act 2005	No. 75 of 2005	
Primary Industries Acts (Further Amendment) Act 2005 (repealed)	No. 76 of 2005	
(Repealed by Legislation Reform (Repeals No. 3) Act 2008 (No. 53 of 2008))
Crimes (Homicide) Act 2005	No. 77 of 2005	
Firearms (Further Amendment) Act 2005	No. 78 of 2005	
Groundwater (Border Agreement) (Amendment) Act 2005 (repealed)	No. 79 of 2005	
(Repealed by Legislation Reform (Repeals No. 3) Act 2008 (No. 53 of 2008))
Major Events (Crowd Management) and Commonwealth Games Arrangements Acts (Crowd Safety Amendment) Act 2005	No. 80 of 2005	22 November 2005
An Act to amend the Major Events (Crowd Management) Act 2003 (Note: Major Events (Crowd Management) Act 2003 (No. 19 of 2003)) to provide for increased powers for authorised officers, police and venue managers in relation to crowd safety and crowd behaviour, to broaden the application of the Act to other venues and events and to provide for additional enforcement powers, to amend the powers relating to bag searches in the Commonwealth Games Arrangements Act 2001 (Note: Commonwealth Games Arrangements Act 2001 (No. 57 of 2001)) and for other purposes.
Prisoners (Interstate Transfer) (Amendment) Act 2005	No. 81 of 2005	
Retail Leases (Amendment) Act 2005	No. 82 of 2005	
Child Wellbeing and Safety Act 2005	No. 83 of 2005	29 November 2005
An Act to establish principles for the wellbeing of children, to establish the Victorian Children's Council and the Children's Services Co-ordination Board, to provide for the Child Safety Commissioner and to confer functions and powers on the Child Safety Commissioner in relation to the safety of children, to provide for the notification of births to municipal councils, to repeal Part IX of the Health Act 1958 and for other purposes.
Commissioner for Law Enforcement Data Security Act 2005	No. 84 of 2005	29 November 2005
Duties and Land Tax Acts (Amendment) Act 2005	No. 85 of 2005	29 November 2005
Environment Effects (Amendment) Act 2005	No. 86 of 2005	29 November 2005
An Act to amend the Environment Effects Act 1978 (Note: Environment Effects Act 1978 (No. 9135)) to improve the operation of that Act and for other purposes.
Investigative, Enforcement and Police Powers Acts (Amendment) Act 2005 (repealed)	No. 87 of 2005	29 November 2005
(Repealed by Statute Law Repeals Act 2012 (No. 30 of 2012))
Land Tax Act 2005	No. 88 of 2005	29 November 2005
An Act to re-enact and modernise the law relating to land tax, to repeal the Land Tax Act 1958, (Note: Land Tax Act 1958 (No. 6289)) to amend the Taxation Administration Act 1997 (Note: Taxation Administration Act 1997 (No. 40 of 1997)) and other Acts and for other purposes.
Mineral Resources Development (Brown Coal Royalties) Act 2005	No. 89 of 2005	
Mines (Aluminium Agreement) (Brown Coal Royalties) Act 2005	No. 90 of 2005	
Motor Car Traders and Fair Trading Acts (Amendment) Act 2005 (repealed)	No. 91 of 2005	
(Repealed by Legislation Reform (Repeals No. 3) Act 2008 (No. 53 of 2008))
Racing and Gambling Acts (Amendment) Act 2005	No. 92 of 2005	
Road Safety and Other Acts (Vehicle Impoundment and Other Amendments) Act 2005 (repealed)	No. 93 of 2005	
(Repealed by Legislation Reform (Repeals No. 3) Act 2008 (No. 53 of 2008))
Superannuation Legislation (Governance Reform) Act 2005	No. 94 of 2005	
Transport Legislation (Further Miscellaneous Amendments) Act 2005	No. 95 of 2005	
Children, Youth and Families Act 2005	No. 96 of 2005	7 December 2005
An Act to provide for community services to support children and their families, to provide for the protection of children, to make provision in relation to children who have been charged with, or who have been found guilty of, offences, to continue The Children's Court of Victoria as a specialist court dealing with matters relating to children, to repeal the Children and Young Persons Act 1989, (Note: Children and Young Persons Act 1989 (No. 56 of 1989)) to amend the Community Services Act 1970 and other Acts and for other purposes.
Health Professions Registration Act 2005	No. 97 of 2005	7 December 2005
Veterans Act 2005	No. 98 of 2005	7 December 2005
Water (Resource Management) Act 2005 (repealed)	No. 99 of 2005	7 December 2005
(Repealed by Legislation Reform (Repeals No. 3) Act 2008 (No. 53 of 2008))
Workplace Rights Advocate Act 2005	No. 100 of 2005	7 December 2005
An Act to establish the office of the Workplace Rights Advocate, to amend the Victorian Civil and Administrative Tribunal Act 1998 and for other purposes.

== Sources ==
- "Acts as made: 2005". Victoria Legislation.
