= Adjudication =

Legal process

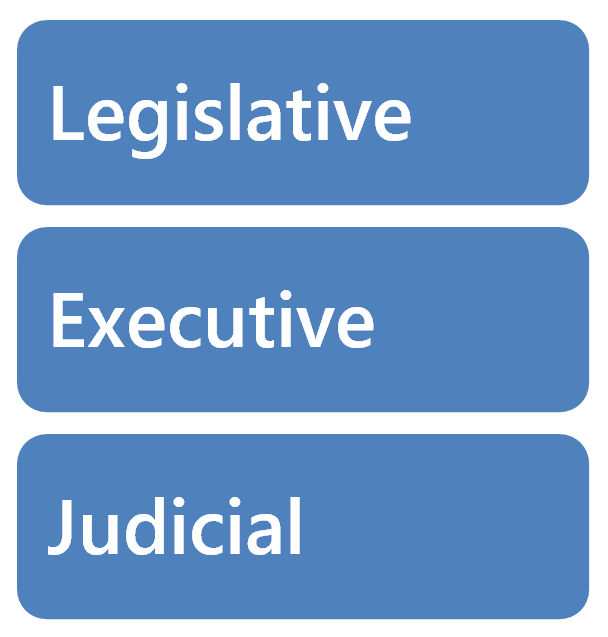
The separation of powers: legislature, executive (government) and judiciary.

Adjudication is the legal process by which an arbiter or judge reviews evidence and argumentation, including legal reasoning set forth by opposing parties or litigants, to come to a decision which determines rights and obligations between the parties involved.

Adjudication can also refer to the processes at dance competitions, in television game shows and at other competitive forums, by which competitors are evaluated and ranked and a winner is found.

== Legal processes ==
Adjudication may be defined as "the legal process of resolving a dispute. The formal giving or pronouncing of a judgment or decree in a court proceeding; also the judgment or decision given. The entry of a decree by a court in respect to the parties in a case. It implies a hearing by a court, after notice, of legal evidence on the factual issue(s) involved; it may be equivalent to a determination. It indicates that the claims of all the parties there to have been considered and set at rest." In some cases, an application for adjudication is an alternative legal process instead of applying for a court hearing.

== Construction law ==
=== Australia ===
Each state and territory has enacted security of payment legislation which provide for adjudication of progress construction claims, starting with New South Wales in 1999. There is very little harmony between the legislation in each jurisdiction regarding the scope of contract covered and the adjudication procedure. However, in all jurisdictions, adjudications are interim pending final resolution of the dispute under the relevant terms of the contract.

==== New South Wales ====
The Building and Construction Industry Security of Payment Act 1999 came into effect in New South Wales on 26 March 2000 and applies to all construction contracts commenced on or after that date. It is not possible to contract out of the legislation. Amendments to the Act made in 2013 are not retrospective, however, earlier amendments are. The Act does not apply to mining work, however, construction work ancillary to the operation of a mine is covered. The Act also does not apply to work undertaken for a resident owner within the meaning of the Home Building Act 1989.

In NSW, the 2016 case of Probuild Constructions (Aust) Pty Ltd v Shade Systems Pty Ltd has allowed an adjudicator's determination for a non-jurisdictional error to be overturned through judicial review. The case went against Brodyn Pty Ltd v Davenport (2004), which had held that judicial intervention was limited to cases of a breach of essential and basic requirements.

==== Queensland ====
The Building and Construction Industry Payments Act 2004 (BCIPA) came into effect in Queensland in October, 2004. Through a statutory-based adjudication process a claimant can seek to resolve payment on account disputes. The act covers construction, and related supply of goods and services, contracts, whether written or verbal. BCIPA is regulated by the Building and Construction Industry Payments Agency, a branch of the Queensland Building Services.

==== Victoria ====
Adjudication is a relatively new process introduced by the government of Victoria, Australia, to allow for the rapid determination of progress claims under building contracts or sub-contracts and contracts for the supply of goods or services in the building industry. This process was designed to ensure cash flow to businesses in the building industry, without parties getting tied up in lengthy and expensive litigation or arbitration. It is regulated by the Building and Construction Industry Security of Payment Act 2002.

Builders, sub-contractors and suppliers need to carefully choose a nominating authority to which they make an adjudication application.

=== Nigeria ===
Adjudication is used in relation to construction disputes in Nigeria, although there is no statutory framework for adjudication under Nigerian law. Lawyers at Stren & Blan Partners note that "recent trends indicate a shift towards adjudication, exemplified by notable settlements in major construction disputes".

=== United Kingdom ===
The relevant legislation in regard to construction in the United Kingdom is the Housing Grants, Construction and Regeneration Act 1996 (1996 Chapter 53), later amended by Part 8 of the Local Democracy, Economic Development and Construction Act 2009.

Any party to a construction contract has the right to refer a dispute arising under the contract to a third party for adjudication, whose decision shall be binding unless the courts or an arbitrator have already made a determination on the referred issue. The Act does not define "adjudication" or an "adjudicator", but an adjudicator's obligation is to act "impartially" (section 108(2)(e)). The parties can agree between themselves who will undertake the adjudication, but where they cannot agree, either party may ask an Adjudicator Nominating Body (ANB) to appoint one. The "Scheme for Construction Contracts", set up under the Scheme for Construction Contracts (England and Wales) Regulations 1998, contains a set of adjudication provisions which are to apply to a construction contract unless the contract itself includes arrangements for adjudication which comply in full with statutory requirements. (Note: Judge Peter Coulson regards it as "resolved" that where there is any difference between contractual adjudication arrangements and statutory requirements, the contractual arrangements fall and the Scheme is applied "in its entirety".) In Scotland, the Scheme for Construction Contracts (Scotland) Regulations 1998 apply.

For there to be a dispute capable of being addressed by adjudication, "it must be clear that a point has emerged from the process of discussion or negotiation that has ended and that there is something which needs to be decided". (Note: Lloyd QC, in the unreported decision of Sindall v Solland, June 2001, quoted in High Court (Technology and Construction Court).)

Section 108(3) of the 1996 Act and paragraph 23(2) of the Scheme for Construction Contracts state that "the decision of the adjudicator shall be binding on the parties, and they shall comply with it until the dispute is finally determined by legal proceedings, by arbitration ... or by agreement between the parties". In the case of Aspect Contracts (Asbestos) Limited (Respondent) v Higgins Construction Plc (Appellant), heard in 2015, the Supreme Court of England and Wales argued that the wording would have been clearer if had said "unless and until" instead of merely "until".

The phrase "true value adjudication" is sometimes used in relation to the role of an adjudicator, meaning that the adjudicator is asked to determine the true value of a completed construction where this may be different from the value claimed by the contractor and/or paid by the client. The term "smash and grab" claim refers to the practice of submitting a large interim payment application at the end of the construction phase of a project, but before completion of the final account, and the term "'smash and grab' adjudication" has been used in relation to several adjudication decisions regarding liability for interim payment of such claims.

==== Selected cases ====
In a 2010 case involving two consecutive adjudications in relation to a construction contract for homeowner Charles Wishart, the High Court allowed the second adjudicator's ruling on an issue which the first adjudicator had commented on and purported to have resolved, but which was not part of, and "wholly unnecessary" to resolve as far as the initial adjudication was concerned. In other circumstances, an adjudicator's ruling is binding and a point which has been resolved cannot be raised again, but where the adjudicator went outside the scope of the adjudication referred to them, their comments were not a binding part of the ruling.

In relation to a 2012 case, Herbosh-Kiere Marine Contractors Ltd v Dover Harbour Board, Matt Molloy notes that there can be a distinction between "statutory adjudication", applying the processes set out in legislation, and "contractual adjudication", where a complainant exercises a right provided for in their contract. In this case, which related to a wreck-removal agreement requiring the contractor to remove the remains of a boat sunk to stop torpedoes being fired into Dover Harbour during World War I, the court determined that the adjudicator had exceeded his jurisdiction and the adjudicator's ruling was therefore not upheld.

In the same case, reference is made to a 2006 Court of Appeal ruling, Carillion Construction v Devonport Royal Dockyard, in which Lord Justice Chadwick reminded litigants that in the UK context, "the majority of adjudicators are not chosen for their expertise as lawyers. Their skills are as likely (if not more likely) to lie in other disciplines. The task of the adjudicator is not to act as arbitrator or judge. The time constraints within which he is expected to operate are proof of that. The task of the adjudicator is to find an interim solution which meets the needs of the case."

== Healthcare ==
"Claims adjudication" is a phrase used in the insurance industry to refer to the process of paying claims submitted or denying them after comparing claims to the benefit or coverage requirements. The adjudication process consists of receiving a claim from an insured person and then utilizing software to process claims and make a decision or doing so manually. If it is done automatically using software or a web-based subscription, the claim process is called auto-adjudication. Automating claims often improve efficiency and reduce expenses required for manual claims adjudication. Many claims are submitted on paper and are processed manually by insurance workers.

After the claims adjudication process is complete, the insurance company often sends a letter to the person filing the claim describing the outcome. The letter, which is sometimes referred to as remittance advice, includes a statement as to whether the claim was denied or approved. If the company denied the claim, it has to provide an explanation for the reason why under regional laws. The company also often sends an explanation of benefits that includes detailed information about how each service included in the claim was settled. Insurance companies will then send out payments to the providers if the claims are approved or to the provider's billing service.

The process of claims adjudication, in this context, is also called "medical billing advocacy".

== Background investigations (employment) ==
In the United States, adjudication is the process directly following a background investigation where the investigation results are reviewed to determine whether a candidate should be awarded a security clearance, or is suitable for a public trust position, which is a job that requires a very knowledgeable and responsible person, often related to national security. It may be determined that the person is not suitable for a public trust position, but is suitable for a non-sensitive position. However, a person may be deemed unsuitable for any position.

From the United States Department of the Navy Central Adjudication Facility: "Adjudication is the review and consideration of all available information to ensure an individual's loyalty, reliability, and trustworthiness are such that entrusting an individual with national security information or assigning an individual to sensitive duties is clearly in the best interest of national security."

== Emergency response ==
Adjudication is the "process of identifying, with reasonable certainty, the type or nature of material or device that set off an alarm and assessing the potential threat that the material or device might pose with corresponding implications for the need to take further action."

== Referring to a minor ==
Referring to a minor, the term adjudicated can refer to children who are under a court's jurisdiction, usually as a result of having engaged in delinquent behavior and not having a legal guardian that could be entrusted with being responsible for him or her. A child dependency or neglect adjudication can also result in a determination that a child is in need of services. Different US states have different processes for declaring a child as adjudicated. Arizona state law defines a dually adjudicated child as "a child who is found to be dependent or temporarily subject to court jurisdiction pending an adjudication of a dependency petition and who is alleged or found to have committed a delinquent or incorrigible act". According to Illinois state law, "adjudicated" means that the Juvenile Court has entered an order declaring that a child "is neglected, abused, dependent, a minor requiring authoritative intervention, a delinquent minor or an addicted minor".

== See also ==
- Administrative law
- Alternative dispute resolution (e.g. Arbitration, Mediation)
- Collateral estoppel
- Dispute resolution (e.g. Lawsuit)
- Jurisprudence
- Res judicata
