= Construction contract =

Type of civil engineering contract

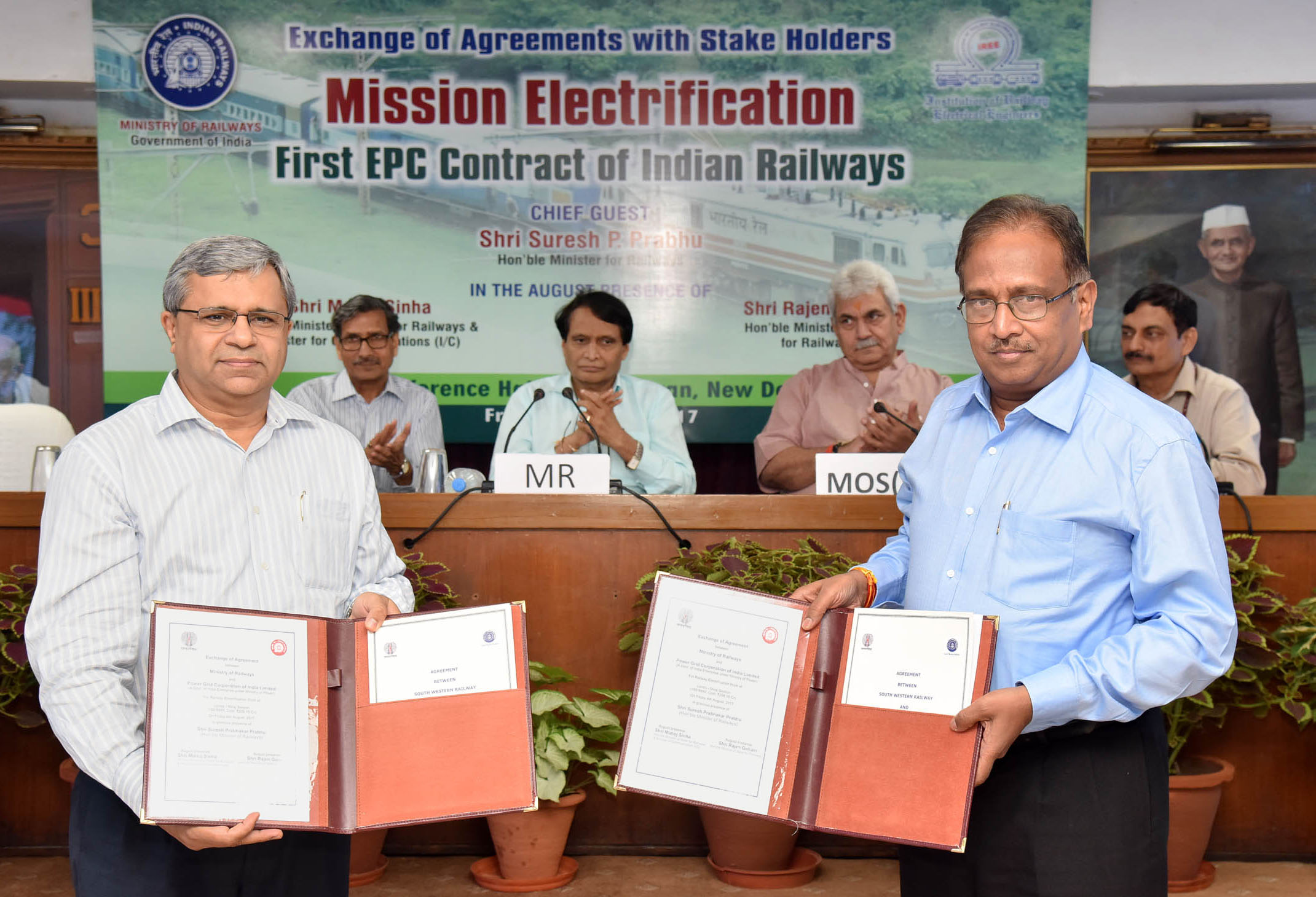
Signing of a governmental construction contract

A construction contract is a mutual or legally binding agreement between two parties based on policies and conditions recorded in document form. The two parties involved are one or more property owners and one or more contractors. The owner, often referred to as the 'employer' or the 'client', has full authority to decide what type of contract should be used for a specific development to be constructed and to set out the legally-binding terms and conditions in a contractual agreement. A construction contract is an important document as it outlines the scope of work, risks, duration, duties, deliverables and legal rights of both the contractor and the owner.

== Types ==
There are three main types of construction contract, identified according to the mechanism for calculating the sum due to be paid by the employer: lump sum contracts, re-measurement contracts and cost-reimbursable contracts. The different types vary primarily with regard to who takes the risks involved, which party has to pay for the cost over runs, and which party can keep the savings if the project costs are less than the estimated costs.

Other types of contract and descriptions of contractual purpose include:

- Commercial contract
- Domestic building contract
- Percentage rate contract
- Item rate contract or Unit price contract
- Lump sum and scheduled contract
- Cost plus fixed fee contract
- Cost plus percentage of cost contract
- Subcontract agreement
- Special contracts

=== Lump sum contract ===
Under a lump sum contract, an owner agrees to pay a contractor a specified lump sum after the completion of work without a cost breakdown. After work is complete, no detailed measurement is required.

=== Lump sum and scheduled contract ===
In lump sum contract the complete work as per plan and specifications is carried out by contractor for certain fixed amount as per agreement. The owner provides required information and contractor charges certain amount. This contract is suitable when the number of items are limited or when it is possible to work out exact quantities of work to be executed. The detailed specifications of all items of work, plans and detail drawings, security deposit, penalty, progress and other condition of contract are included in agreement. Though it is lump sum and scheduled contract, contractor will be paid at regular interval of 2–3 months as per progress of work on the basis of certificate issued by engineer in charge. A schedule of rate is included in agreement for making payment of extra items.

Under a lump sum contract, a “fixed price” for the work to be done is agreed upon by the client and contractor before the work begins. This contract can also be applied to both home building and commercial contracts. It can be more of a risk to the contractor as there are fewer mechanisms to allow them to vary their price.

=== Commercial contracts ===
A commercial contract is an agreement containing all the work that should be performed for the construction of a commercial building or non-residential building. A skillfully constructed commercial contract can protect both parties' interests, minimize risks, and increase profitability for the contractor.

=== Domestic construction contracts ===
A domestic building contract is an agreement containing all the work that should be performed for the construction of a commercial or residential building existing or occurring inside a particular country. Not foreign or international.

=== Percentage rate contract ===
When the lowest rate and comparative position among the contractors are already specified prior to the opening of the tender, then the percentage rate contract is used. Percentage contract is a type of contract where there is no possibility of unbalanced tender.

=== Cost plus fixed fee contract ===
In cost plus fixed fee, the owner pays the contractor an agreed amount over and above the documented cost of work.

This is a negotiated type of contract where actual and direct costs are paid for and additional fee is given for overhead and profit is normally negotiated among parties. The owner is in more control of the project; however, the risks are transferred to the owner.

A cost plus contract states that a client agrees to reimburse a construction company for building expenses such as labor, materials, and other costs, plus additional payment usually stated as a percentage of the contract's full price.

This type of construction contract is an alternative to lump sum agreements. It allows flexibility and transparency for the homeowner, and reduces the risk for a contractor since a Cost Plus construction contract guarantees them a profit.

The difference between this type of contract which is a cost-based contract with lump-sum contract is that in guaranteed maximum price (GMP), if there is any savings resulted from cost under runs, then that would be stipulated price contract, and the contractors will keep the savings obtained from the cost under runs for themselves and there is no obligation for them to give them back to the owners. Nevertheless, this saving can be shared by both the contractor and the owner. Another difference is about status of the plans. The lump-sum contract may be used when the owner does have a complete set of construction plans, specifications etc. available, otherwise, the guaranteed maximum price (GMP) is preferred to be included to compensate for this lacking. When the Cost-Plus is utilized, it is better for the owner to determine the guaranteed maximum price, to prevent any further cost and contractor needed to provide the primary input for owner about the project cost.

Duke and Carmen stated "Cost-plus with GMP provides an upper limit on total construction costs and fees for which an owner is responsible. If the party providing the work under this pricing method runs over GMP, it is responsible for such overruns…Cost-plus with GMP and an agreement for sharing cost savings can incentivize both parties to a construction contract to work together as efficiently as possible.”

In this type of contract, the owner has more authorities in monitoring, inspecting and auditing the project periodically before ultimate payment. Therefore, the risk will be transferred from owner to contractor and this would be an attraction for the customer.

=== Cost plus a percentage of cost contract ===
In cost plus percentage, the owner pays greater than 100 percent of the documented cost, usually requiring detailed expense accounting. In this type of contract, contractor is paid the actual cost of work plus certain percentage as profit. Various contract documents, drawing, specifications are not necessary at the time of signing the agreement. The contractor has to keep all records for cost of material and labour and contractor will be paid accordingly to engineer in charge. This type of contract is suitable for emergency work like difficulties in foundation conditions, construction of expensive structure etc. The U.S. Federal Acquisition Regulations specifically prohibit the use of this type for U.S. Federal Government contracting.

=== Re-measurement contract ===
Under a re-measurement (or remeasurement) contract, the price to be paid for the whole work is to be ascertained by measurement in detail of the various parts of the work and the valuation of the work done by reference to a schedule of prices included in the contract. The FIDIC Red Book 4th edition (the predecessor of the 1999 Red Book) is used in some parts of the world as a re-measurement contract for civil engineering works.

=== Subcontract agreement ===
A subcontractor agreement is a contract primarily between a builder or a principal contractor and subcontractor. It outlines the perimeters of specialist work to be done for the construction project.

=== Unit cost contract ===
A unit cost contract or unit price contract is based on the units put in place rather than a single price. Payments are calculated at a specific rate for each item such as per cubic yard for concrete times quantity put in place. "The contractor quotes an owner a price for a particular task or scope of work, though at the time of contracting the parties may not know the actual number of the units of work to be completed." Consequently, the owner does not have an exact final price until the project is finished. This type of contract is normally utilized where the quantity of work cannot be established, such as in civil engineering construction projects where excavation of soil and rock is involved. The contractor is paid based on the units that have been put in place and verified by the owner.

Unit cost contracts provide more flexibility in discrepancies in field quantities and because of this, they are often used on heavy and highway construction contracts. Associated General Contractors of America (AGC) states that this type of contract is hardly used for the entire project and is mostly applied to when contracting with subcontractors which identification of different quantities are of matter of importance and they are commonly used for repair and maintenance work. For this reason, it is "not particularly useful for most private building projects, except as part of a lump sum or cost-plus contract, applied to select components of work items such as dirt removal or fill, finish hardware, etc."

=== Special contracts ===
Special contracts are further classified into five types:

- Turn key contract

Owner exerts governance over the contractor. Contractor exerts governance over internal units and sub suppliers.

- Negotiated contract
- Package contract
- Continuing contract
- Running contract

== Features of construction contracts ==
=== Base date ===
A "base date" is a reference date from which changes in conditions can be assessed. In a construction contract, the inclusion of a base date is generally used as a mechanism for the allocation of risk between the owner and contractor for changes which might occur in the period between the contractor pricing the tender and the signing of the contract. This period can potentially be very long and changes that occur may have a significant impact on the costs of the works.

The base date sets the reference date from which the conditions under which the tender was prepared are considered to have been known by the contractor and so are properly reflected in their price. If specified conditions change before the contract is implemented, then the contract may be adjusted to reflect this.

In very small projects, where the time frame is short, this may not be considered necessary. On larger projects, the base date can be used to allow changes to the contract sum, or sometimes extensions of time, or even to determine which rules will apply to the contract (for example, which edition of the arbitration rules).

The exact provisions will depend on the specific form of contract being is adopted. For example, in the Joint Contracts Tribunal (JCT) Design and Build Contract, the base date determines the allocation of risk in relation to changes in statutory regulations, changes to VAT exemptions and changes to definitions of dayworks. Under the JCT's Standard Building Contract, 2011 Edition, if there are changes to “Statutory Requirements” after the contract's base date, then the contractor must alter the scope of work to comply. The change will be deemed to be a variation for which the contractor is entitled to be paid, even if no formal instructions have been issued.

=== Practical completion ===
Practical completion occurs when the contractor returns possession of the site to the owner, usually at the time when the work has been completed and accepted by the client. A certificate of practical completion usually confirms this acceptance. Typically half of the retention monies are released, the contractor's potential liability for liquidated damages ends and the defects rectification period begins.

=== Retention ===
A retention is a sum of money withheld by the owner under the contract to act as security against incomplete or defective works. It can be a percentage of the work that has been completed, but cannot be unlawful.

=== Sectional completion ===
Sectional completion refers to a provision within a construction contract which allows different completion dates for different sections of the works. This is common in larger projects which are completed in stages, allowing the client to take possession of the completed parts whilst construction continues on others.

=== Snagging ===
Snagging refers to a process where the owner or the owner's agent checks for any defects, which the contractor needs to put right before the final payment is made. The UK consumer organisation Which? states that the most common issues picked up by snagging surveys for residential properties tend to be concerned with the completion of plastering, tiling, skirting boards and external brickwork.

== See also ==
- Australian Construction Contracts
- Economics
- Engineering, procurement and construction
