= Australian Construction Contracts =

Australian Construction Contracts govern how the parties to a construction contract behave and how the project manager and the contract manager administer the relationship between the parties. There are several popular standard forms of construction contracts that are currently used in Australia.

== Forms of Contract ==
=== Australian Building Industry Contract – ABIC MW-1 – Major works contract ===
General

This contract has been developed jointly by the Royal Australian Institute of Architects and the Master Builders Australia Inc. and supersedes the Joint Contracts Committee (JCC) contracts, which are now withdrawn. It claims to use plain English and to involve less risk to architects than the ABS contract. It is recommended for use on building works of a major nature ($250,000 to $25million) where an architect is engaged to administer the contract. In its present form it does not appear to have any advantages over the ABS contracts.

Variations

A maximum percentage for the Contractor's overheads and profit is nominated in Schedule 1 of the contract and is applied to the value of variations (additions and omissions)

Provisional Sums

A percentage nominated in Schedule 1 of the contract is applied to the difference between the provisional sum and the cost of performance of the work. In the case where the performance of the work cost is more than the provisional sum, a percentage nominated in Schedule 1 of the contract is added to the difference and the resultant is added to the contract sum. Where the performance of the work cost is less than the provisional, the difference is deducted from the contract sum

Failure To Pay

The rate of interest to be applied to contractually outstanding payments is nominated in Schedule 1.

Reimbursement as a result of a delay in the progress of the works

The contract allows for reimbursement for causes of delay listed in clause L1.1 clause 1 to 13. This provision therefore provides reimbursement to the builder even though the cause of delay was not a breach of contract on the part of the proprietor. Where the delay is caused by breach on the part of the proprietor, the builder is entitled to recover damages sustained and incurred.

=== Australian Building Industry Contract – SW-1 ===
General

This contract is similar to MW-1 but is intended for use on building works from A$50,000 to A$3million.

=== General Conditions of Contract – National Public Works Conference Edition 3 ===
General

Issued by the Department of Administrative Services – Australian Construction Services, these conditions are still in use by some of the Public Works Departments in all states.

Variations

Where the variation is valued by applying bill or schedule rates, no percentage is added. Where daywork rates are applied an agreed charge to cover overheads, administrative costs, site supervision, establishment costs, attendance and profit is made.

Provisional Sums

No allowance is made on account of profit to or attendance on the adjustment of provisional sums.

Failure To Pay

No mention of an interest rate is made.

Reimbursement as a result of a delay in the progress of the works

No reimbursement is allowed unless the cause of the delay was due to any breach of the provisions of the contract by or any other act or omission on the part of the Principal, etc.

=== Australian Standard General Conditions of Contract AS4000 ===
General

This document updates AS2124-1992 to cater for changes in construction practice and law and the AS4000 series of documents are probably the most widely used in major works.

Variations

Variations are valued by the superintendent using rates or prices in the contract. Where the bill of quantities or schedule of rates is not a contract document the rates shall still apply. No percentage is added to or deducted from the rates, but variations of omission include profit but not overheads. As overheads are not defined in the conditions it is common to accept the preliminaries on the overheads.

Provisional Sums

A percentage nominated in the Annexure is applied to the amount actually paid for each provisional sum and can therefore result in an increase or decrease in the contract sum depending on whether the actual amount was more or less than the provisional allowance.

Failure To Pay

The rate of interest is stated in the Annexure.

Reimbursement as a result of a delay in the progress of the works

Reimbursement applies to compensable causes which are stated and can be expanded by completing the appropriate item in the Appendix.

=== Lump Sum Contract for Simple Building Works – SBW ===
General

This form of contract is used for building works that are not complex in nature.

Variations

Variations are valued in accordance with rates and prices nominated in a schedule, and these amounts should be inclusive of all profit, overheads, etc. Where the variation results in an addition the percentage rate nominated in the Appendix is added to the variation total.

Failure To Pay

The rate of interest is stated in the Appendix.

Reimbursement as a result of a delay in the progress of the works

Reimbursement is allowable only for certain causes of delay and for example inclement weather, although a cause for time extension, is not a cause with attracts time extension costs.

=== Australian Standard General Conditions of Contract AS4905 ===
General

The provisions of this document are similar to AS4000 but are for minor works.

Variations

Variations are valued by the superintendent using rates or prices in the contract. Where the bill of quantities or schedule of rates is not a contract document the rates shall still apply. No percentage is added to or deducted from the rates, but variations of omission include profit but not overheads. As overheads are not defined in the conditions it is common to accept the preliminaries on the overheads.

Provisional Sums

A percentage nominated in the Annexure is applied to the amount actually paid for each provisional sum and can therefore result in an increase or decrease in the contract sum depending on whether the actual amount was more or less than the provisional allowance.

Reimbursement as a result of a delay in the progress of the works

Reimbursement applies to time extensions resulting from delay or disruption caused by Principal, Superintendent and their employees etc. Any other events for which costs for delay or disruption are payable must be shown in the Annexure. The Annexure does not have the provision for additional compensation clauses.

=== Project Contract PC-1 1998 ===
General

Produced by the Property Council of Australia, this document can be seen as an alternative to ABIC MW1 and AS contracts. It is suitable for Design and Construct projects, as well as Construct only contracts.

Variations

Variations are valued using rates or prices which appear in the Cost Schedule or the priced Bill of Quantities where applicable. The percentages stated in the Contract Particulars are added to the value calculated. The percentages are also to be applied where a reasonable amount is agreed or determined. In agreeing or determining the reasonable amount, no mark-ups are to be included.

Provisional Sums

No percentage adjustment or mark-up is required until the increase of the let amount of provisional sum work exceeds 20% of the allowed amount. Thereafter, the difference is increased by the percentage stated in the Contract Particulars.

Failure To Pay

The interest rate is stated in the Contract Particulars on contractually outstanding amounts.

Reimbursement as a result of a delay in the progress of the works

Where a time extension is due to a breach of the contract by the Owner, the Contractor is entitled to reimbursement at the rate stated in the Contract Particulars. If an extension of time is granted as a result of a variation, then reasonable costs and expenses incurred are to be added to the value of the variation.

=== Cost Plus Contract for Building Works – FF/C ===
General

This form of contract is intended for building works (including alterations) where the contract is to be administered by an architect and where payment to the builder is to be on the basis of the actual cost of the works plus a fee. This fee may be either a lump sum or a percentage of the cost of the works.

=== General Conditions of Contract for Design and Construction (AS4902) ===
General

AS4902 provides choices for the project procurement:

- Design and construct – the Principal provides the Principal's project requirements and does not normally provide a detailed preliminary design and does not require novation of any sub-contractors (including consultants);
- Design development and construct – the Principal provides the Principal's project requirements together with a preliminary design;
- Design, Novate and Construct - the Principal provides the Principal's project requirements together with a preliminary design and requires selected sub-contractors to be novated to the Contractor.

Variations

Variations are valued by the superintendent using rates or prices in the contract. Where the bill of quantities or schedule of rates is not a contract document the rates shall still apply. No percentage is added to or deducted from the rates, but variations of omission include profit but not overheads. As overheads are not defined in the conditions it is common to accept the preliminaries on the overheads.

Provisional Sums

A percentage nominated in the Annexure is applied to the amount actually paid for each provisional sum and can therefore result in an increase or decrease in the contract sum depending on whether the actual amount was more or less than the provisional allowance.

Failure To Pay

The rate of interest is stated in the Annexure.

Reimbursement as a result of a delay in the progress of the works

Reimbursement applies to time extensions resulting from delay or disruption caused by Principal, Superintendent and their employees etc. Any other events for which costs for delay or disruption are payable must be shown in the Annexure.

=== Construction Management Agreement ===
General

This agreement is for use where no head contractor exists and the owner pays to the manager a fee for his services. The agreement is issued by the Royal Institute of Architects (Victorian Chapter).

== Liquidated Damages ==
Each set of contract conditions contains in its Annexure of Schedule a space for inserting a rate for liquidated damages. This rate is a genuine pre-estimate of damages that the owner will incur if the project is not completed by the authorised date for completion. Once contractually accepted the rate will apply whether the actual damages are higher or lower than the pre-estimate. Liquidated damages are always calculated on calendar days.

Liquidated Damages may be capped at a percentage of the contract sum. It is normal for Australian construction contractors to seek liability relief by trying to introduce a cap on Liquidated Damages, typically 10% of the contract sum.
