= Security of payment =

Security of Payment refers to any system designed to ensure that contractors and sub-contractors are paid even in case of dispute. This can involve a system of progress payments, interim arbitration decisions, or a system which legally requires a company to pay an invoice within a set number of days, regardless of whether the company believes they are accurate.

== Security of Payment in Australia ==
=== Background ===
Security of Payment legislation has been introduced by each Australian State and Territory to allow for the rapid determination of progress claims under building contracts or sub-contracts and contracts for the supply of goods or services in the building industry. This process, which establishes adjudication as the primary dispute resolution mechanism, was designed to ensure cash flow to businesses in the construction industry, without the parties getting tied up in lengthy and expensive litigation or arbitration. In addition to quick payment, the scheme also allows for security of payment to be provided in stages or payment schedule.

NSW was the first State to implement a legislative scheme in 1999, with the remaining States following suit between 2002 and 2009. There is no federal Security of Payment legislation in Australia.

Security of Payment Legislation in Australia
State	NSW	ACT	Qld	SA	Vic	WA	NT	Tas
Act	Building and Construction Industry Security of Payment Act 1999	Building and Construction Industry (Security of Payment) Act 2009	Building and Construction Industry Payments Act 2004	Building and Construction Industry Security of Payment Act 2009	Building and Construction Industry Security of Payment Act 2002	Construction Contracts Act 2004	Construction Contracts (Security of Payments) Act 2004	Building and Construction Industry Security of Payment Act 2009
Regulation	Building and Construction Industry Security of Payment Regulation 2008	N/A	Building and Construction Industry Payments Regulation 2004	Building and Construction Industry Security of Payment Regulations 2011	Building and Construction Industry Security of Payment Regulations 2013	Construction Contracts Regulations	Construction Contracts (Security of Payments) Regulations 2004	N/A
Responsible Government Department	NSW Fair Trading	Environment and Planning Directorate	Building and Construction Commission	Office of the Small Business Commissioner	Building and Plumbing Commission	Building Commission	Building Advisory Services	Building Standards and Occupational Licensing

=== Reviews of Security of Payment Legislation ===
Since 1974 there have been at least 30 reviews, discussion papers, and inquiries at the state and federal level that are related to financing in the building and construction industry.

There is currently a federal review underway, led by John Murray AM. The Murray Review was announced on 21 December 2016, with a progress report due by 30 September 2017. A final report with recommendations is due to the Minister for Employment no later than 31 December 2017.

The NSW Office of Fair Trading is also conducting a full review of the NSW Security of Payment legislation following a discussion paper released in December 2015. Submissions closed on 26 February 2016. There is no publicly available final due date for this report.

=== Adjudication and Authorised Nominating Authorities ===
Adjudication using a third party is much quicker rather than litigation through a court. An adjudicator’s determination must be made within 10 days of receipt of application. It is also less expensive. An adjudicator’s determination is binding on the parties and claims can be recovered as a debt owing in a Court.

Despite the Security of Payment Act, lengthy litigation disputes do still persist. The scale of the problem is still huge, as witnessed by "Australia Gas Firms Locked in Legal Battles with Contractors"

In addition an adjudicator's decision may be overturned as well, the case of Probuild Constructions (Aust) Pty Ltd v Shade Systems Pty Ltd has allowed an adjudicator's determination for a non-jurisdictional error to be overturned through judicial review. In another case, it went against Brodyn Pty Ltd v Davenport which previously held judicial intervention was limited to cases of a breach of essential and basic requirements.

There is a strong perception that Adjudicators are biased in favour of claimants, especially in the States using the 'East Coast' model of Security of Payment legislation. Claimants in these jurisdictions apply for adjudication of a payment dispute through an Authorised Nominating Authority rather than agree an Adjudicator with the respondent (as is the case in the 'West Coast' model). This perception is caused by the perceived ability for claimants to pressure ANAs into providing an Adjudicator that will favour the claimant's case.

In response to this issue, Queensland abolished Authorised Nominating Authorities in December 2014 amendments to its Security of Payment legislation. They have been replaced with an Adjudication Registrar. However this has led to new challenges, with the number of withdrawn Security of Payment applications increasing from 33% to 94% between December 2014 and September 2015.

=== Challenges associated with Security of Payment Legislation in Australia ===
The December 2015 Senate Inquiry into Insolvency in the Australian Construction Industry found that Security of Payment legislation has been effective where it was used. However it is underutilised by subcontractors for several reasons, chiefly:

1. There is still a major power imbalance between subcontractors and contractors;
2. There is confusion and poor understanding of the legislative scheme; and
3. Accessing the scheme is still costly.

==== Power imbalance ====
Although the Security of Payment legislation was designed to reduce the power imbalance in the payment chain, the scheme’s own take-up has been deterred by this same power imbalance.

Fear of retribution, threatening behaviour and intimidation from those higher in the contractual chain act as a strong deterrent to using the legislation. The intimidation may be indirect, such as a questionnaire including “have you ever used the SoP legislation?”.

Further, subcontractors fear or have actually been threatened by head contractors that if they make a payment claim they will be cut off from future work. In fact, the likelihood of ability to get future work can be the basis for a subcontractor’s decision to use the Act.

==== Confusion and poor understanding ====
The Collins Review found that there is a lack of knowledge and awareness among subcontractors of what rights and enforcement options are available. This is compounded by the lack of education and support for subcontractors attempting to utilise the Act.

A second contributory factor is the relative lack of financial acumen amongst smaller-scale contractors, who have not needed to acquire financial or legal skills during their career.

The short timeframes can in fact negatively affect parties as they may not realise they are in a dispute and their time under the legislation has started to run. Alternatively, subcontractors may be deliberately strung out by parties with greater legal resources and cash flow.

==== Costliness of dispute resolution ====
Short time frames have sped up the rate at which subcontractors can recover payment, ensuring critical cash flow for claimants.

However there has been a significant amount of litigation created by the Security of Payments legislation around Australia. According to the Collins Review, even a simple claim with an adjudicator and legal fees can cost around $4,000-5,000, meaning that subcontractors may be underpaid by $4,000 per progress payment without fear of dispute resolution action.

The cost of enforcing Adjudicators’ findings has proven to be also a disincentive for potential claimants. An enforcement action requires considerable time, effort and financial outlay borne directly by subcontractors. Subcontractors who engage legal advice in order to seek overdue progress payments often emerge less well-off than subcontractors who cut their losses. Larger respondents have been able to string-out court action until the claimant either becomes insolvent or ends the legal action.

=== Private measures ===
Commonly, businesses in the building and construction industry in Australia will include the following statement on payment claims or tax invoices:

"This is a payment claim made pursuant to the Building and Construction Industry (Security of Payment) Act 2009 (ACT)” or "This is a payment claim made under the Building and Construction Industry Security of Payment Act 1999 NSW". These Statements may vary depending in which Province the Claim is made. However this has not been a requirement in NSW since legislative amendments in 2013.

== Security of Payment in the UK ==
The UK's security of payment scheme can be found in the Housing Grants, Construction and Regeneration Act 1996. This Act was amended in 2009 by the passage of the Local Democracy, Economic Development and Construction Act 2009.
