= Environment Effects Act 1978 =

Parliament of Victoria
- Long title: An Act to require the Environmental Effects of certain Works to be assessed, and for other purposes.
- Citation: No. 9135
- Royal assent: 23 May 1978

The Environment Effects Act 1978 (No. 9135) is current legislation that was passed in the Australian state of Victoria. It requires certain public works to have an environmental impact assessment carried out before proceeding. It was amended by the Environment Effects (Amendment) Act 2005.

It was described as flawed since it allows the Planning Minister to set terms for the assessment and to override the findings for social or economic reasons.

== See also ==
- Environment of Australia
