= Building and Construction Industry Security of Payment Act 2002 =

Parliament of Victoria
- Long title: An Act to provide for entitlements to progress payments for persons who carry out construction work or who supply related goods and services under construction contracts and for other purposes.
- Citation: No. 15 of 2002
- Royal assent: 14 May 2002

The Building and Construction Industry Security of Payment Act 2002 (No. 15 of 2002) was passed by the Australian state of Victoria to allow for the rapid determination of progress claims under building contracts or sub-contracts and contracts for the supply of goods or services in the building industry. This process was designed to ensure cash flow to businesses in the building industry, without parties get tied up in lengthy and expensive litigation or arbitration.

Adjudication is much quicker than litigation in a court (an adjudicator's determination must be made within 10 days of receipt of application) and less expensive. An adjudicator's determination is binding on the parties and can be recovered as a debt owing in a court.

== See also ==
- Building Adjudication Victoria Inc

== External sources ==
- Building and Construction Industry Security of Payment Act 2002 (on AustLII)
