= Point of total assumption =

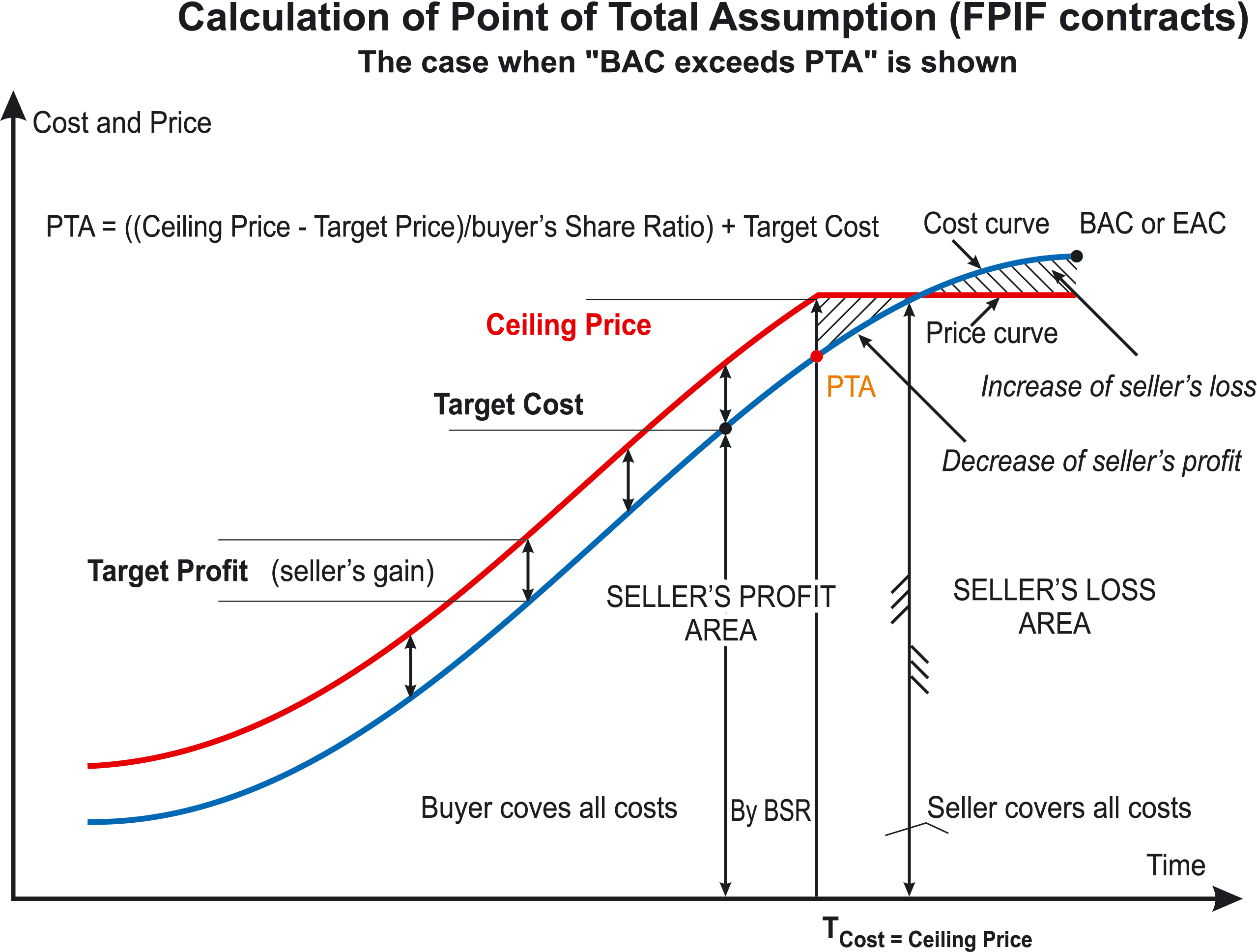
Calculation of Point of Total assumption (the case when EAC exceeds PTA that should be treated as a risk trigger, is shown)

The point of total assumption (PTA) is a point on the cost line of the profit-cost curve determined by the contract elements associated with a fixed price plus incentive-Firm Target (FPI) contract above which the seller effectively bears all the costs of a cost overrun. The seller bears all of the cost risk at PTA and beyond, due to a dollar for dollar decrease in profit beyond the costs at the PTA. In addition, once the costs on an FPI contract reach PTA, the maximum amount the buyer will pay is the ceiling price. Note, however, that between the cost at PTA and when the cost equals the ceiling price, the seller is still in a profitable position; only after costs exceed the ceiling price is the seller in a loss position.

== Calculation ==
Any FPI contract specifies a target cost, a target profit, a target price, a ceiling price, and one or more share ratios. The PTA is the difference between the ceiling and target prices, divided by the buyer's portion of the share ratio for that price range, plus the target cost.

PTA = ((Ceiling Price - Target Price)/buyer's Share Ratio) + Target Cost

For example, assume:

Target Cost:	2,000,000
Target Profit:	200,000
Target Price:	2,200,000
Ceiling Price:	2,450,000
Share Ratio:	80% buyer–20% seller for overruns, 50%–50% for underruns

PTA = ((2,450,000 - 2,200,000)/ 0.80) + 2,000,000 = 2,312,500.

If for a moment, PTA is given and you are trying to calculate the ceiling price for the buyer (maximum amount that the buyer will have to spend), the calculation will be

(2,000,000 (target cost)) + 200,000 (the profit the buyer pays to the seller) + (2,312,500 - 2,000,000)*0.8 = 2450000.

This is a term used in project management when managing specific fixed price contracts.

The reason to calculate PTA is that when executing the contract, actual cost is the only finance measurement. Compare this measurement with the cost base line to calculate Cost Performance Index (CPI), then we can estimate (forecast) the cost at Completion ('EAC' – Estimate at Completion – according to PMBOK, or 'FAC' – Forecast at Completion – in Ms Project).

If EAC exceeds PTA, the buyer is expected to pay the ceiling price, and any more overruns beyond PTA will cause a dollar for dollar decrease in profit for the seller. The profit decrease rate become higher, and once actual cost exceeds ceiling price the seller will start losing money (and then might stop working for the contract).

From the risk management point of view, EAC should be controlled under PTA to keep this risk far away. When "EAC exceeds PTA" is found in control cost process, it should be treated as a risk trigger.

== Related terms ==
For cost reimbursable contract, the Point of Total Assumption does not exist, since the buyer agrees to cover all costs. However, a similar incentive arrangement with similar components, called a Cost-Plus-Incentive Fee (CPIF) contract sometimes is used. The CPIF includes both a minimum fee and a maximum fee. The share line in combination with the Target Fee, Maximum Fee and Minimum Fee can be used to easily calculate the points at which the incentive arrangement affects fee. The range between these points is called the "range of incentive effectiveness."

== History, example ==
The idea of a "Point of Total Assumption" is an extremely recent one. In the government's efforts to cut cost overruns, the PTA is being introduced to FPIF contracts on an increasingly wide basis.

Moreover, high-level professional examinations for industry certification, such as the Project Management Professional certification, are beginning to test applicants' knowledge of this concept and its application.

But an example can be given, with the KC-46 development contract, and one recent article (KC-46 EMD contract (update March 2015)), including an interesting chart.

=== Regulations ===
For contracts subject to the Federal Acquisition Regulations, FAR 16.403-1 provides the Government description of FPI. The contract type is implemented by calling out FAR Clause 52.216-16 Incentive Price Revision - Firm Target. This clause captures the Ceiling Price as well as the government share ratio(s). If multiple line items are identified as FPI type, the individual line item information shall be included here, otherwise final contract costs and price are reconciled at the contract level.

== Sources ==
- Langford, John W. (2007). Logistics: principles and applications. SOLE Press Series (2nd ed.). McGraw-Hill. pp. 207–208. ISBN 978-0-07-147224-1.
- Project Management Body of Knowledge (PMBOK) (5th ed.). Project Management Institute. 2014.
- Mulcahy, Rita; et al. (2013). Rita Mulcahy's PMP Exam Prep (8th ed.). RMC Publications, Inc. pp. 479–481. ISBN 978-1-932735-65-9.
- Singh, Harvinder (2009). Point of Total Assumption - Interesting facts in Deep Fried Brain - PM Certification Exam Prep Blog
