= Pmhub =

PMHUB is a free (not for profit) virtual community of professional project managers who recognise the Project Management Institute's Project Management Body of Knowledge (or briefly PMBOK) project management standard. Whilst a number of the members have already earned their PMP (Project Management Professional) certification the majority of the community consists of those who aspire to become PMP or CAPM-certified.

== Site Purpose ==
PMHub is a study resource which aims to assist managers around the world to study for their PMP or CAPM (Certified Associate in Project Management) certification exams, based on PMBOK Third Edition.

== Site Resources ==
PMHub maintains archives of "lessons learned” from project managers who have passed their PMP exam, CAPM exam and PgMP exam with the help of project management experts. Also included are downloadable files and study guides, sample questions, tips and tricks, and advice from people who have passed the exam. Its website archived more than 500 PMP Exam questions accessible to all.

PMHuB maintains around 25 PMP, Project Management and CAPM forums. The most commonly visited forums are: Lessons Learned/exam tips and Tricks, CAPM and the PMHub Discussions on PMP Certification Yahoogroup Forum (which archived more than 20,000 questions and answers since 2001), and Jim Owens PMP Exam Tips & Columns. Newest PMHUB website is PMHUB PMDigest - Digest of articles relating to PMP Certifications, Road Map, Tips and Tricks, Best of Lessons Learned, Study Notes and Tools and Free Exam Problems (starting April 1, 2009)

== PMHub History ==
The PMHub community was founded on June 4, 2001, initially as the Yahoo group, "PMPCERT".

In 2005, the community was expanded to include a website and also a phpBB Forum based community which is in sync with the original Yahoo group.

In early August 2005, the site name was changed to PMHub and it comprised

1. PMHUB Google Group, latest newcomer in the PMHUB community, 2/2, 2007 with 5,000 members (April 2009)
2. PMHUB Yahoo Group, with 19,500 members (starting June 4, 2001)
3. PMHUB Forums - forums.pmhub.net, with more than 40,000 members as at April 2009 (starting April 20, 2005) - Deactivated in 2014
4. CAPM Forum - part of PMHUB Forums - Deactivated in 2014
5. PgMP Forum - part of PMHUB Forums - Deactivated in 2014
6. PMHUB homepage - pmhub.net - more than 700,000 hits per month
7. PMI-SP Forum - part of PMHUB Forums - Deactivated in 2014
8. PMI-RMP Forum - part of PMHUB Forums - Deactivated in 2014
9. PMHUB PMDigest - Digest of articles relating to PMP Certifications, Road Map, Tips and Tricks, Best of Lessons Learned, Study Notes and Tools, Download Files and Free Exam Problems (starting April 1, 2009)

== Other functions ==
PMP aspirants may post questions in the appropriate forum that cannot be answered elsewhere, and these questions are answered by volunteer project management "gurus", and by other PMP students. The site also facilitates the formation of real or virtual study groups, so students can "meet" others in their own town or city, or scattered all over the globe.

There is also a news section on the PMHub home page for PMP and CAPM related issues, such as PMI’s upcoming credential for program managers and program directors, the OPM3 maturity model and other topics.

== PMHub Columnists ==
The recommended method of interacting with PMHub is via the PMHub homepage. The homepage features project management and PMP related columns, by PMHub columnists: John Reiling, PMP, Jim Owens PMP, Eric Nielsen PMP, David J. Lanners PMP, David Kohrell PMP, Tony Johnson PgMP, Dr. Paul D. Giammalvo, Cornelius Fichtner PMP and roger Chou, PgMP. Also published are Video lectures on PMBOK 3rd edition and PMP sample exams. The website also contains news and articles on project management topics and PMP certification.

== PMP Worldwide ==
There are over 1,800,000 PMPs in 175 countries, and the PMP, a rigorous, examination-based certification that itself holds an ISO 9001 quality certification, has become the most sought after and highly-valued project management credential in the world. As of 2013 over 500,000 people held the PMP credential.(PMI wiki)
