= Extreme project management =

Extreme project management (XPM) refers to a method of managing very complex and very uncertain projects.

Extreme project management differs from traditional project management mainly in its open, elastic and nondeterministic approach. The main focus of XPM is on the human side of project management (e.g. managing project stakeholders), rather than on intricate scheduling techniques and heavy formalism.

Extreme project management corresponds to extreme programming. Advanced approaches to extreme project management utilize the principles of human interaction management to deal with the complexities of human collaboration.

The term "Extreme project management" has not been picked up by any of the international organizations developing Project Management Standards. What might be understood as a similar concept is "Agile Project Management". The ISO Standard ISO 21502:2020 refers to the term "agile" as a delivery approach (of products; related to project scope), and the PMBoK Standard published by the Project Management Institute refers to an "adaptive" type of development lifecycle also called "agile" or "change-driven" with regard to the product development lifecycle of a project (an element of the project lifecycle).

== Usage ==
The software industry is a fast growing domain and in constant development and change. Despite the fact that there are plenty of methodologies and techniques used when it comes to project management, some new, and others that have been used for decades, extreme project management is an evolved approaches to project management in this industry.

Given that requirements are constantly changing and technology is evolving very rapidly, extreme projects move forward very fast and allow for teams to work in shorter timelines, being able to better understand and approve each other's ideas and work.

For extreme project management to produce rapid change, it is necessary for all team members to communicate and reach full understanding. This method is used during the project execution and change control process and it is not allowed to be used for overall strategy or project prioritization.

To produce project plans, XPM uses a concept similar to rapid application development (RAD) called rapid application planning (RAP). Stakeholders are invited by the project manager to the RAP session where a sequence of steps (including planning the project) is run so that the best decisions are taken.

Extreme project management contributes to success in three different ways:

1. With it, you manage the unknown and unpredictable.
2. It instills desire and confidence among stakeholders and it focuses on gaining and sustaining commitment to the project mission.
3. It is a holistic approach, based on reality, managed by specialists.

== Extreme vs traditional ==
Traditional project management is defined as an approach which assesses the project through five process groups: initiation, planning, execution, monitoring and completion.

The main characteristics of a traditional project management are:

- Few scope change requests
- Well-understood technology infrastructure
- Low risk
- Experienced and skilled project teams
- Plan-driven TPM projects

While traditional project management is used for linear work, without any significant changes, extreme project management is ideal for fast-speed projects with unpredictable results.

One challenge faced by the traditional approach is that most software development projects' requirements change during the project execution period.

Extreme projects are “a complex, self-correcting venture in search of a desired result” (Doug DeCarlo), where requirements are constantly changing throughout the project as a response to environmental factors such as competition, technology, and economic conditions.

Extreme projects are characterized by:

- Low possibility of failure
- Short deadlines
- Paramount innovation
- Important quality of life

Traditional project management utilizes the "waterfall method", whose purpose is to plan project activity in a straight line. In the traditional approach, each process runs linearly, resulting with what was planned from the beginning.

The extreme approach, conversely, does not run constantly, instead adapting the project activity during the process, which leads in the final stage to a desired result.

An extreme project management life cycle model is one that proceeds from phase to phase based on very limited knowledge of goal and solution. Each phase learns from the proceeding ones and redirects the next phase in an attempt to converge on an acceptable goal and solution.

== Mindset ==
Fundamental to success on an extreme project is the application of both the appropriate complex method and the required mindset.

Mindset is one of the most important and critical factors related to the extreme project management. In order to change the mindset of a team, there are some main rules for extreme approach for project management:

- Chaotic project activities are normal
- Uncertainty is one of the most common characteristic of an extreme project
- Uncontrollable project
- Spontaneous changes happen during the processes
- XPM increases the security

Mindset is defined as “a set of beliefs and assumptions about how the world works” (Douglas DeCarlo). Mindset is the project’s internal programming.

A quantum mindset is needed to manage extreme projects in order to provide the project team an opening to change and unpredictability.

== Extreme project manager ==
A project manager is a professional in the field of project management whose responsibility is to plan, execute and manage any project. An extreme project manager has to complete all duties and tasks at a high-speed level, following the proper extreme project methodology.

The first step of any management methodology is that extreme project managers have to meet the client or the project stakeholders. Also, a specific analysis must be made to accentuate the value being provided to the client, emphasizing the benefits the client will gain as soon as the project is over.

The extreme project manager is charged with responsibilities to the organization they represent, to the team, and to the project itself. Necessary skills include administrative credibility, political sensitivity and leadership.

The main tasks that an extreme project manager has to fulfill for the project to be successful are:

- negotiating
- communicating with all parties
- dealing with obstacles
- keeping a balance between team members and motivating them

One of the rules that a manager needs to know is that extreme analysis is a way for the clients to know the benefits he will gain, emphasizing its value once the project is completed.

== Books ==
- Ajani, Shaun H. Extreme Project Management: Unique Methodologies - Resolute Principles - Astounding Results
- Kevin Aguanno (2005). Managing Agile Projects. Multi-Media Publications. Archived from the original on 25 June 2012.
- Doug DeCarlo Xtreme Project Management: Using Leadership and Tools to Deliver Value in the Face of Volatility
- Thomsett, Rob. Radical Project Management
- Wysocki, Robert K., Rudd McGary. Effective Project Management: Traditional, Adaptive, Extreme
- Whitty, S.J.; Maylor, H. (2007). And then came Complex Project Management. 21st IPMA World Congress on Integrated Project Management Approach.

== See also ==
- Agile software development
