= Ricardo Viana Vargas =

Brazilian engineer (born 1972)

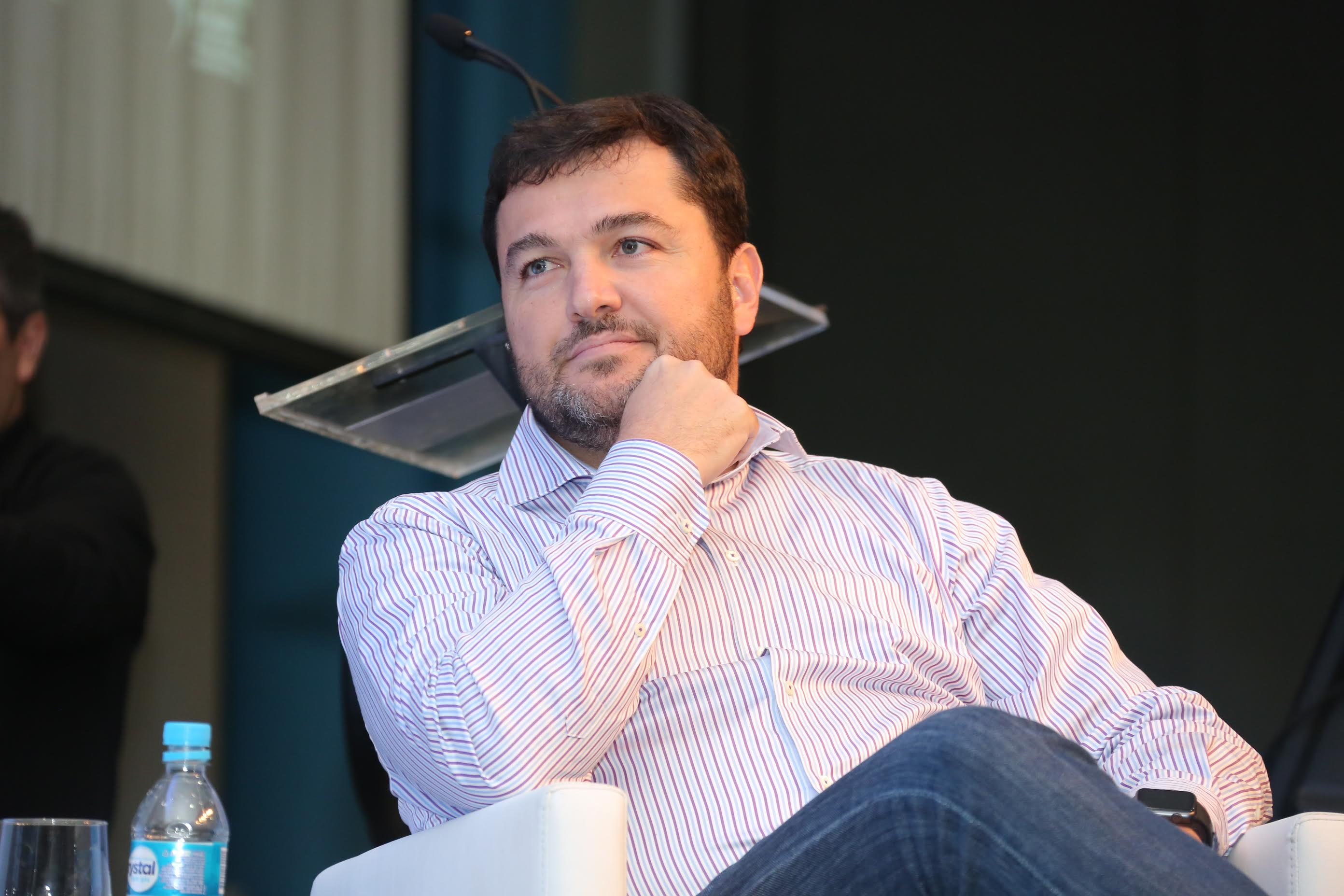
- Born: 8 April 1972 (age 54); Belo Horizonte, Brazil
- Education: B.S. Chemical Engineering, Federal University of Minas Gerais; M.S. Industrial Engineering, Federal University of Minas Gerais; Doctorate's degree student in Civil Engineering (UFF)
- Occupation: Executive director of brightline initiative
- Known for: First Director of infrastructure and project management at the United Nations
- Website: www.ricardo-vargas.com

Ricardo Viana Vargas is a Brazilian engineer, author of project management books and executive director of Brightline Initiative: a strategic initiative management movement formed by The Boston Consulting Group (BCG), Project Management Institute (PMI), Bristol-Myers Squibb, Saudi Telecom Company, Lee Hecht Harrison, NetEase and Agile Alliance.

Previously, Vargas was the director of infrastructure (engineering) and project management at the United Nations Office for Project Services (UNOPS).

== Early life and education ==
Vargas was born in Belo Horizonte, Brazil. In 1995 he received a bachelor's degree in chemical engineering and in 2002 a master's degree in industrial engineering from Brazil's Federal University of Minas Gerais. Vargas also has a master's certificate in project management from George Washington University and training in strategy and innovation from Massachusetts Institute of Technology (MIT).

== Career ==
Vargas has been a member of the Project Management Institute (PMI) since 1997 and served on the PMI's board of directors from 2007 to 2009. He was the first Brazilian member of the institute's Board. Vargas became the first Latin American chair of the Board in 2009.

He has written multiple books on project management. Vargas also served as a reviser to the project management manual A Guide to the Project Management Body of Knowledge (PMBOK) published by PMI and chaired the Translation Verification Committee for the Guide's Brazilian Portuguese translation in 2000 and 2004.

From 2012 to 2016, Vargas worked as Director of infrastructure and project management at the United Nations Office for Project Services (UNOPS) where he was responsible for an annual budget of 1 billion dollars and headed a team of 300 project managers. One of his responsibilities was to create adequate infrastructure and adequate conditions in war refugee camps to receive migrants who found themselves obligated to leave their country of origin.

In 2017, he became the executive director of Brightline Initiative.

In 2018, Vargas co-wrote and co-produced "Zaatari- Memórias do Labirinto", a documentary detailing the largest refugee camp of the Syrian war that had become equivalent in size to the city of Jordan.

== Awards ==
Vargas received the PMI Distinguished Contribution Award (DIST) and PMI Product of the Year Award in 2005.

In 2010, he was named Brazilian Project Management Personality of the Decade.

Microsoft rewarded Vargas for the years of 2013, 2014, 2015 and 2016 with the Most Valuable Professional (MVP) for his work with the Microsoft Project.

In 2015, Vargas received the TQM Award from the Association for the Advancement of Cost Engineering for his contribution to project management.

== Bibliography ==
- Analytical Hierarchy Process, Earned Value and other Project Management Themes ISBN 1502528126
- Microsoft Project 2016 (ISBN 9788574528014)
- 140条推文 让你项目管理快速入门 (Chinese) (ISBN 978-1544731100)
- Planning in 140 Tweets (ISBN 9781628250169)
- Planejamento em 140 Tweets (Portuguese) (ISBN 9788574525716)
- Planificación en 140 Tuits (Spanish) (ISBN 9781631027543)
- Planlægning med 140 Tweets (Danish) (ISBN 978-1517273330)
- Planifier en 140 Tweets (French) (ISBN 978-1517270506)
- Pianificando in 140 Tweets (Italian)(ISBN 978-1517799489)
- التخطيط في ١٤٠ تغريدة (Arabic) (ISBN 978-1518835711)
- Manual Prático do Plano de Projeto (Portuguese) (ISBN 978-85-7452-430-6)
- Practical Guide to Project Planning (ISBN 1420045040)
- Análise de Valor Agregado em Projetos 5a Edição (Portuguese) (ISBN 9788574524696)
- Gerenciamento de Projetos: Estabelecendo Diferenciais Competitivos (Portuguese) (ISBN 9788574522999)
- Gerenciamento de Projetos: Estratégia, Planejamento e Controle (Portuguese) (ISBN 8585840773)
- Microsoft Project 2013 Standard, Professional and Pro to Office 365 (Portuguese) (ISBN 9788574526232)
- Microsoft Project 2010 Standard e Professional (Portuguese) (ISBN 9788574524689)
- Microsoft Office Project 2007 (Portuguese) (ISBN 978-85-7452-315-6)
- Microsoft Office Project 2003 Standard, Professional e Server (Portuguese) (ISBN 857452168X)
- Microsoft Project 2002 (Portuguese) (ISBN 8574521159)
- Microsoft Project 2000 (Portuguese) (ISBN 85-7452-056-X)
- Construindo Times Eficazes (Portuguese) (ISBN 978-85-7452-706-2)
