= Fixed price =

Non-negotiable price for a product

A fixed price is a price designated for a good or a service that is neither subject to bargaining nor bartering. The price may be fixed since the seller has placed it, or given that the price is managed by the authorities under price regulation. Fixed prices may also refer to swaps whereby payments are determined upon a never-ending interest rate, if not referring to negotiated price points that are not amendable under regular situations. These also extend towards fixed-price contracts, whereas the price is not permitted to fluctuate unless there are premeditated mitigating situations; The equivalents of these, by definition, are cost-plus contracts, where the contractor-originating costs are managed, likewise with additional revenue subsidies issued.

Bargaining is very common in many parts of the world, primarily in the Middle East, Africa as well as Asia but not in most retail stores in Europe, North America, and Japan. Elsewhere, fixed prices tend to be an exception from the norm. Before the introduction of currency, both practices were the universally accepted means of transaction, at a domestic and international rate.

== Fixed-price tender ==
In fix priced tender offers, shareholders are granted permission to sell their firm in a firm subject towards a fixed price, generally set at a premium opposed to the market price. These are usually limited-time offers, and commonly hold higher pricing than market value. They are often used by acquiring companies to purchase a specific share quantity within target firms.

== Fixed-price contract ==
A fixed-price contract is a contract where the contract payment does not depend on the amount of resources or time expended by the contractor, as opposed to cost-plus contracts. Fixed-price contracts are often used for military and government contractors to put the risk on the side of the vendor and control costs.

Historically, when fixed-price contracts are used for new projects with untested or developmental technologies, the programs may fail if unforeseen costs exceed the ability of the contractor to absorb the overruns. In spite of this, such contracts continue to be popular. Fixed-price contracts tend to work best when costs are well-known in advance.

== See also ==
- F. W. Woolworth Company
- Testimony of Integrity
- Unit price
- Variable pricing
