= Diametral compression test =

Test to measure Tensile strength of material

A diametral compression test involves applying a stress load or force to the point where a material object is split in half (down the diameter of the object). This test indirectly measures the tensile property of a material object, as the molecules of the material are pushed apart in opposite directions, similar to what happens to molecules in a direct tensile strength test.
