= Integrated Project Management Approach =

The IPMA (Integrated Project Management Approach) method is a design process method that was started in 1984. The integrated project delivery approach is a project delivery method that emphasizes collaboration, accountability, and control, aiming to reduce risks.

== Details ==
In 1984, the construction of a Four Seasons Hotel in Los Angeles was started by Anthony Mason of AMAPM (Anthony Mason Associates Project Management). The traditional design–bid–build (D/B/B) approach led to disagreements among the project team.

Project Management is crucial across various project disciplines, especially in today's dynamic and competitive environment. Effective project delivery benefits from a collaborative, team-based approach. While Integrated Project Delivery (IPD) and LEAN Construction methods have shown potential, they have not become the industry's preferred methods. A scalable, adaptable, and collaborative approach is needed for everyday projects.

To address these challenges, a method called "Intent of Design" (IGMP) was implemented. The "IGMP/GMP method" was later identified as the IPMA method, taught at the GSD since 2011. This method involved integrating the general contractor (GC) earlier in the design process and using schematic stage drawings, with the collaboration of the architects and engineers. The GC would then provide an initial guaranteed maximum price (GMP) to try to minimize the construction cost. The method also involved competitive subcontractor bidding.

IPMA was used on over 120 projects and has been documented by Harvard University. The method is currently taught at the Harvard Graduate School of Design.

== See also ==
- Integrated project delivery
- Lean construction
- Design–bid–build
- Project management
- Guaranteed maximum price
