= XPM =

XPM may refer to:

- Primecoin, a peer-to-peer open source cryptocurrency
- X PixMap, an ASCII text image format used by the X Window System (uses the extension .xpm)
- XPM (TV series), a Canadian sitcom television series
- Extreme project management
- Cross-phase modulation, a technique used in optical transmission and reception
- Windows XP Mode, a virtualization feature available for Windows 7
