= Value breakdown structure =

Project management technique

A value breakdown structure (VBS) is a project management technique introduced by Stephen Devaux as part of the total project control (TPC) approach to project and program value analysis.

The concept has similarities with the deliverable-oriented work breakdown structure (WBS) decomposition which is used in project management and systems engineering to break down a project into smaller components in a tree structure that represents how the work of the project will create the components of the final product. Resources and cost are typically inserted into the activities in a WBS, and summed to create a budget both for summary levels (often called "work packages") and for the whole project or program.

Similarly, a value breakdown structure will provide the expected value-added of each activity and/or component of the project (or projects within a program).

Value breakdown structure was first included in the eighth Edition of the Project Management Institute's PMBOK Guide in 2026.

== Mandatory and optional activities ==
In most projects (and programs), there are some components and activities (and projects) that are mandatory and others that are optional.

- Mandatory activities are required, and have the full value of the project investment, as the project cannot be completed without them.
- Optional activities, in contrast, have only the value that they are adding to the project, i.e., their value is equal to the delta between the project/program value if they are included and the value if they are omitted.

For example, in creating an automobile, an engine, a driveshaft and wheels may all be considered mandatory, whereas cupholders are optional. If any of the mandatory activities are excluded, the project's value approaches zero. But the value of the cupholders is only the difference between the value of the car with and without cupholders.

=== Value contributions may not necessarily be summarized ===
Values cannot be summed in a value breakdown structure similarly to how costs can be summed up from the branches of a work breakdown structure to provide an overall budget. For example, if the value of an automobile is $25,000, there are many components and activities that are mandatory in generating that value – leave any of them out, and the value of the project approaches zero. Therefore, the fact that the engine, driveshaft and wheels are all mandatory, and each therefore has a value-added of $25,000 does NOT make the value of the automobile $75,000.

== Purpose ==
The main purpose of the value breakdown structure is to prioritize components and work by the value they are expected to add, and to ensure that the value of the project investment is not reduced by the inclusion of work which has a value-added that is less than its true cost, which is the sum of its resource costs and its drag cost. This can often happen if the project's critical path changes so that different activities suddenly acquire critical path drag and drag cost: an optional activity that adds $10,000 to the expected value of the project and has a budget of $5,000 may make sense when it can be performed off the critical path but should probably be jettisoned if on the critical path if they now have a negative value-added due to a drag cost of more than $5,000.

== Use in index of project performance ==
The value from the value breakdown structure should also be used as the basis for tracking project value through Devaux's Index of Project Performance (DIPP). If scope is changed during execution, that change should be input into the value breakdown structure, the numerator in computing the Actual DIPP adjusted, and the DIPP Progress Index thus updated.
