= CAPM =

CAPM may refer to:

- Capital asset pricing model, a fundamental model in finance
- Certified Associate in Project Management, an entry-level credential for project managers
