= Cost-plus-incentive fee =

A cost-plus-incentive fee (CPIF) contract is a cost-reimbursement contract which provides for an initially negotiated fee to be adjusted later by a formula based on the relationship of total allowable costs to total target costs.

Like a cost-plus contract, the price paid by the buyer to the seller changes in relation to costs, in order to reduce the risks assumed by the contractor (seller). Unlike a cost-plus contract, the cost in excess of the target cost is only partially paid according to a buyer/seller ratio, so the seller's profit decreases when exceeding the target cost. Similarly, the seller's profit increases when actual costs are below the target cost defined in the contract.

According to the PMBOK (7th edition) by the Project Management Institute (PMI), CPIF is a "type of cost-reimbursable contract where the buyer reimburses the seller for the seller's allowable cost (allowable costs are defined by the contract), and the seller earns its profit if it meets defined performance criteria".

== Formula and Examples ==
Incentive contracts allow sharing of the risks between the contractor and the client. The contractor is reimbursed all its justifiable costs in addition to a calculated fee. The basic elements of a CPIF contract are:

- Target Cost: the estimated total contract costs.
- Actual Cost: constitutes the reasonable costs that the contractor can prove have been incurred.
- Target Fee: the basic fee to be paid if the Target Cost matches the Actual Cost (target profit). The Target Fee varies between the Minimum Fee and the Maximum Fee according to a formula tied to the Actual Cost (e.g. Target Fee could be 10% of the Actual Cost).
- Sharing Ratio: the agreed upon cost sharing proportion, normally expressed in percentage (e.g. 85% for the client / 15% for the contractor). It is often different for cost overruns and cost underruns.

Other components of incentive fee contracting include:

- Maximum Fee: the highest fee that may be earned, usually expressed as a percentage.
- Minimum Fee: the lowest fee that may be earned, usually expressed as a percentage.

The Final Fee (profit of the contractor) is expressed as follows: Final Fee = Target Fee + (Target Cost - Actual Cost) * Contractor Share. (Note: In the formula, an asterisk ("*") is used for multiplication)

The Final Price of the contract is expressed as follows: Final Price = Actual Cost + Final Fee.

Note that if Contractor Share = 1, the contract is a Fixed Price Contract; if Contractor Share = 0, the contract is a cost plus fixed fee (CPFF) contract.

For example, assume a CPIF with:

- Target Cost = 1,000
- Target Fee = 100
- Benefit/Cost Sharing Ratio for cost overruns = 80% Client / 20% Contractor
- Benefit/Cost Sharing Ratio for cost underruns = 60% Client / 40% Contractor

If the Actual Cost is higher than the Target Cost, say 1,100, the client will pay: 1,100 + 100 + (1,000 - 1,100) * 0.2 = 1,180 (contractor earns 80).

If the Actual Cost is lower than the Target Cost, say 900, the client will pay: 900 + 100 + (1,000 - 900) * 0.4 = 1,040 (contractor earns 140).

== Sources ==
- Project Management Institute (2021). A guide to the project management body of knowledge (PMBOK guide). Project Management Institute (7th ed.). Newtown Square, PA. ISBN 978-1-62825-664-2.
