= Time and materials =

Standard phrase in contract law

Time and materials (T&M) is a standard phrase in a contract for construction, product development, or any other piece of work in which the employer agrees to pay the contractor based upon the time spent by the contractor's employees and the subcontractors' employees to perform the work, and for the materials used in the construction or manufacturing, plus the contractor's markup on the materials used, no matter how much work is required to complete construction. Time and materials is generally used in projects for which it is not possible to estimate the size of the project accurately, or when it is expected that the project requirements will most likely change.

This is opposed to a fixed-price contract in which the owner agrees to pay the contractor a lump sum for fulfillment of the contract, no matter what the contractors pay their employees, sub-contractors, and suppliers.

Many time and materials contracts also carry a guaranteed maximum price, which puts an upper limit on what the contractor may charge but allows the owner to pay less if the job is completed more quickly.
