= Cost-plus contract =

Contract involving additional payment to allow for risk and incentive sharing

A cost-plus contract, also termed a cost plus contract, is a contract such that a contractor is paid for all of its allowed expenses, plus an additional payment to allow for risk and incentive sharing. Cost-reimbursement contracts contrast with fixed-price contracts, in which the contractor is paid a negotiated amount regardless of incurred expenses.

== History ==
Frank B. Gilbreth, one of the early developers of industrial engineering, used "cost-plus-a-fixed sum" contracts for his building contracting business. He described this method in an article in Industrial Magazine in 1907, comparing it to fixed price and guaranteed maximum price methods.

Cost-plus contracts were first used by the government in the United States during World War I to encourage wartime production by American businesses. According to Martin Kenney, after World War II they "allowed what were then small technology firms like Hewlett-Packard and Fairchild Semiconductor to charge the Department of Defense for the price of research and development that none could pay on its own. This enabled the firms to create technology products that eventually created entire new markets and economic sectors".

== Types ==
There are four general types of cost-reimbursement contracts, all of which pay every allowable, allocatable, and reasonable cost incurred by the contractor, plus a fee or profit which differs by contract type.

- Cost plus a fixed-fee (CPFF) contracts pay costs plus a pre-determined fee that was agreed upon at the time of contract formation.
- Cost-plus-incentive fee (CPIF) contracts have a larger fee awarded for contracts which meet or exceed certain performance goals, for example being on schedule and any cost savings.
- Cost-plus-award fee (CPAF) contracts pay a fee based upon the contractor's product. An aircraft development contract, for example, may pay award fees if the contractor's product achieves certain speed, range, or payload capacity goals. For some contracts, the award fee is determined subjectively by an awards fee board whereas for others the fee is based upon objective performance metrics.
- Cost plus percentage of cost contracts pay a fee that increases as the contractor's cost increases. Because this contract type provides a disincentive for the contractor to control costs it is rarely used by government, although it is prevalent in private industry. Federal legislation in the 1940s excluded use of this type of contract in various defense projects, and the U.S. Federal Acquisition Regulations specifically prohibit the use of this type for U.S. Federal Government contracting and in federal sub-contracts except firm fixed price ones (FAR Part 16.102). The US Comptroller General has also found that where the additional element is not expressed as a percentage but as an additional amount which rises in bandings in line with the contractor's cost increases may effectively constitute a "cost plus percentage of cost" contract and therefore fall within the prohibition.

Contract type	U.S. government outlays in FY07
Award-fee contracts	$38 billion
Incentive-fee contracts	$8 billion
Fixed-fee contracts	$32 billion

== Usage ==
A cost-reimbursement contract is appropriate when it is desirable to shift some risk of successful contract performance from the contractor to the buyer. It is used most commonly when the item purchased cannot be defined explicitly, as for research and development, or for cases where there is not enough data to estimate the final cost accurately. A cost-plus contract is often used when performance, quality or delivery time is a much greater concern than cost, such as in the United States space program. Cost plus contracting was expanded to include services such as engineering, consulting, and a variety of other such efforts in the 1980s.

=== Recent ===
Between 1995 and 2001 fixed fee cost-plus contracts constituted the largest subgroup of cost-plus contracting in the U.S. defense sector. Starting during 2002 award-fee cost plus contracts became more numerous than fixed fee cost plus contracts.

The distribution of annual contract values by sector category and award types indicates that cost plus contracts in the past had the largest importance in research, followed by services and products. In 2004, however, services replaced research as the dominant sector category for cost-plus contracts. For all other contract types combined the relative ranking is reversed to the original cost-plus order, meaning that products are most numerous, followed by service and research.

With cost-plus contracting being designed primarily for research and development, cost plus contracts were used in many different efforts unrelated to research and development. The percentage of cost-plus contracting within a contract is expected to be correlated to the percentage share of research undertaken in any given program. However, several programs, such as the Lockheed Martin F-35 Lightning II, UGM-133 Trident II, CVN-68, and the CVN-21 deviate from this pattern by continuing to make extensive usage of cost-plus contracting despite the programs being subsequent to the research and development state.

== Advantages ==
- A cost-type contract can be used where technical requirements and specifications are very general, vague, uncertain or unknown, or circumstances do not allow the requiring organization to define its requirements sufficiently to allow for a fixed-price type contract, or uncertainties involved in contract performance do not permit costs to be estimated with sufficient accuracy to use any type of fixed-price contract.
- Final cost may be less than for a fixed price contract due to lower risk premium, especially when the ability to estimate costs is low.
- Allows more oversight and control of the quality of the contractor's work.
- Flexible, allowing for changes of specification within the contractual scope of work.

== Criticism ==
- There is limited certainty as to what the final cost will be.
- Requires additional oversight and administration to ensure that only permissible costs are paid and that the contractor is exercising adequate overall cost controls. Ensuring that costs claimed are consistent with the cost accounting rules of doing business with the government can increase the cost of oversight and audits. The government delaying final payment for closeout of the contract can increase the ultimate cost of a contract because of the ability of a provider to bill for increased overhead and general and administrative costs, increased wages, and many other costs which can be passed on to the government.
- The withholding of funds which is required under the rules governing cost plus contracting can increase the cost of the contract.
- Under a cost plus a fixed-fee contract, the profit element does not vary with costs and there is no incentive for contractors to control costs.
- Incentives which share the risk between government and contractor lead less efficient contractors to underestimate their target costs in order to maximize their profits from actual costs. This perverse incentive reduces the ability of the government to distinguish between efficient and inefficient contractors.
- In a 1992 UK legal case, Laserbore Ltd. v Morrison Biggs Wall Ltd., "cost of labour, plant and materials plus a reasonable percentage for profit" was put forward as one way of calculating payment due to the sub-contractor where there was a dispute as to what was stipulated under the contract. Judge Bowsher QC ruled that such a "cost-plus" approach was an incorrect method for calculating payment due and a method based on general market rates payable for work similar to the disputed action was a more appropriate approach.

== See also ==
- Cost engineering
- Cost-plus pricing
