= Certified Associate in Project Management =

Credential offered by the Project Management Institute

Certified Associate in Project Management (CAPM) is a professional certification offered by the Project Management Institute (PMI).

The CAPM is an entry-level certification for project practitioners. Designed for those with less project experience, the CAPM is intended to demonstrate candidates' understanding of the fundamental knowledge, terminology and processes of effective project management.

== Exam syllabus ==
The CAPM exam is based on the A Guide to the Project Management Body of Knowledge, colloquially known as "The PMBOK Guide".

The Certified Associate in Project Management (CAPM) Credential Handbook, notes the distribution of questions from the PMBOK:

1. Chapter 1 "Introduction to Project Management" (6%)
2. Chapter 2 "Project Environment" (6%)
3. Chapter 3 "Role of the Project Manager" (7%)
4. Chapter 4 "Project Integration Management" (9%)
5. Chapter 5 "Project Scope Management" (9%)
6. Chapter 6 "Project Schedule Management" (9%)
7. Chapter 7 "Project Cost Management" (8%)
8. Chapter 8 "Project Quality Management" (7%)
9. Chapter 9 "Project Resource Management" (8%)
10. Chapter 10 "Project Communication Management" (10%)
11. Chapter 11 "Project Risk Management" (8%)
12. Chapter 12 "Project Procurement Management" (4%)
13. Chapter 13 "Project Stakeholder Management" (9%)

The exam consists of 150 multiple-choice questions with four answers per choice. Candidates have 3.0 hours to complete the exam.

To be able to apply, one needs a secondary diploma (high school diploma/global equivalent) as well as a minimum of 1,500 hours of project experience OR 25 hours of project management education.

== Certification cycle ==
The CAPM certificate is valid for three years from the time of exam passage. As of 2020, certification holders must earn 15 professional development units (PDUs) every three years in order to maintain their credentials.

== See also ==
- Project Management Professional
