= The Wrong Man =

1956 film by Alfred Hitchcock

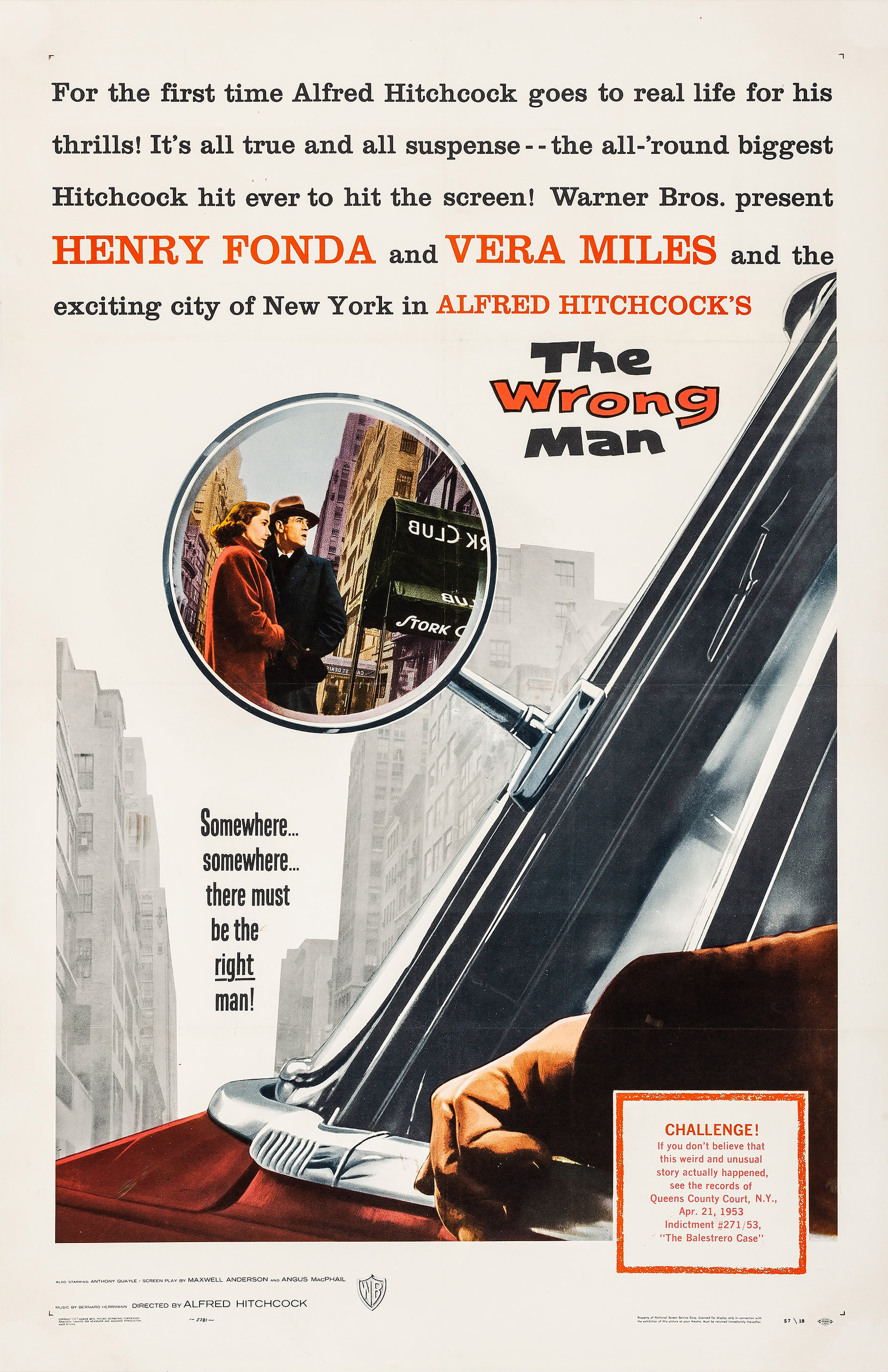
- Theatrical release poster
- Directed by: Alfred Hitchcock
- Screenplay by: Maxwell Anderson; Angus MacPhail
- Story by: Maxwell Anderson
- Based on: The True Story of Christopher Emmanuel Balestrero by Maxwell Anderson
- Produced by: Alfred Hitchcock
- Starring: Henry Fonda; Vera Miles
- Cinematography: Robert Burks
- Edited by: George Tomasini
- Music by: Bernard Herrmann
- Production company: Warner Bros. Pictures
- Distributed by: Warner Bros. Pictures
- Release date: December 22, 1956 (US)
- Running time: 105 minutes
- Country: United States
- Language: English
- Budget: $1.2 million

The Wrong Man is a 1956 American docudrama film noir directed by Alfred Hitchcock and starring Henry Fonda and Vera Miles. The film was drawn from the true story of an innocent man charged with two counts of armed robbery, as described in the book The True Story of Christopher Emmanuel Balestrero by Maxwell Anderson and in the magazine article "A Case of Identity", which was published in Life magazine in June 1953 by Herbert Brean.

It is recognized as the only Hitchcock film based on a true story and whose plot closely follows the real-life events.

The Wrong Man had a notable effect on two significant directors: it prompted Jean-Luc Godard's longest piece of written criticism in his years as a critic, and it has been cited as an influence on Martin Scorsese's Taxi Driver.

== Plot ==
Alfred Hitchcock appears on screen in silhouette to introduce the film as a true story, whose "every word is true".

Christopher Emmanuel "Manny" Balestrero, a down-on-his-luck musician at New York City's Stork Club, needs $300 for dental work for his wife Rose. When he visits the office of a life insurance company to borrow money against Rose's policy, he is mistaken by the staff for a man who had previously robbed them twice.

Manny is questioned by police detectives, who tell him that they are looking for a man who had robbed the insurance company and other businesses, and that Manny matches the witnessess' descriptions of the subject. Manny is asked to visit businessess that had previously been robbed for identification. Later, he is asked to write the words from a stick-up note used by the robber in the insurance company robbery; he misspells the word "drawer" as "draw"—the same mistake made in the robber's note. After being picked out of a police lineup by an employee of the insurance company who had witnessed the robberies, he is arrested on charges of armed robbery.

Upon suggestion from a friend, Manny and Rose retain attorney Frank O'Connor for Manny's defense. Manny and Rose set out to collect evidence proving Manny's alibi; at the time of the first hold-up, he was on vacation with his family, and at the time of the second, his jaw was so swollen that witnesses would certainly have noticed. However of the three people with whom the couple played cards at the vacation hotel, two have died and the third cannot be found. This devastates Rose, who experiences a psychotic break and sinks into a deep depression, forcing her to be instituionalized.

Manny's trial begins, however a juror's remark forces a mistrial. While awaiting a second trial, Manny is exonerated when the true robber is arrested while attempting to rob a grocery store. Manny visits Rose at the hospital to share the good news, however she remains depressed and nonresponsive. The film ends on a title card, stating that two years later Rose made a full recovery, and that Manny and his family now live peacefully in Florida.

== Cast ==
- Henry Fonda as Christopher Emmanuel "Manny" Balestrero
- Vera Miles as Rose Balestrero
- Anthony Quayle as Frank O'Connor
- Harold J. Stone as Det. Lt. Bowers
- Charles Cooper as Det. Matthews
- John Heldabrand as Tomasini
- Esther Minciotti as Mama Balestrero
- Doreen Lang as Ann James
- Laurinda Barrett as Constance Willis
- Norma Connolly as Betty Todd
- Nehemiah Persoff as Gene Conforti
- Lola D'Annunzio as Olga Conforti
- Werner Klemperer as Dr. Bannay
- Kippy Campbell as Robert Balestrero
- Robert Essen as Gregory Balestrero
- Richard Robbins as Daniel, the guilty man

Cast notes

- Actors appearing in the film but not listed in the credits include Harry Dean Stanton, David Kelly, Tuesday Weld, Patricia Morrow, Bonnie Franklin and Barney Martin. Weld and Franklin made their film debuts as two adolescent girls answering the door when the Balestreros are seeking witnesses to prove his innocence.

== Production ==
A Hitchcock cameo is typical of most of his films. In The Wrong Man, he appears only in silhouette in a darkened studio before the credits at the beginning of the film, announcing that the story is true; he originally intended to be seen as a customer walking into the Stork Club, but edited himself from the final print.

Hitchcock strove to lend the film a “documentary” style and chose to revisit and film in many locations from Balestrero’s real story, even going so far as to include people present in his life at the time. The proprietor of the Stork Club, among others, appears as himself.

Many scenes were filmed in Jackson Heights, the neighborhood where Manny lived when he was accused. Most of the prison scenes were filmed among the convicts in a New York City prison in Queens. The courthouse was located at the corner of Catalpa Avenue and 64th Street in Ridgewood.

Bernard Herrmann composed the soundtrack, as he did for all of Hitchcock's films from The Trouble with Harry (1955) to Marnie (1964). It is one of the most subdued scores Herrmann ever wrote, and one of the few that he composed with some jazz elements, primarily to represent Fonda's appearance as a musician in the nightclub scenes.

This was Hitchcock's final film for Warner Bros. Pictures. It completed a contractual commitment that had begun with two films that were produced for Transatlantic Pictures and released by Warner Bros.: Rope (1948) and Under Capricorn (1949), his first two films in Technicolor. After The Wrong Man, Hitchcock returned to Paramount Pictures.

== Reception ==
A. H. Weiler of The New York Times wrote that Hitchcock "has fashioned a somber case history that merely points a finger of accusation. His principals are sincere and they enact a series of events that actually are part of New York's annals of crime but they rarely stir the emotions or make a viewer's spine tingle. Frighteningly authentic, the story generates only a modicum of drama." Philip K. Scheuer of the Los Angeles Times agreed, writing, "As drama, unhappily, it proves again that life can be more interminable than fiction."

Richard L. Coe of The Washington Post wrote, "Having succeeded often in making fiction seem like fact, Alfred Hitchcock in The Wrong Man now manages to make fact seem like fiction. But it is not good nor interesting fiction."

John McCarten of The New Yorker declared, "Mr. Hitchcock makes a good point about the obtuseness of a police group that holds firm to the belief that everyone is guilty until proved innocent, but his story of the badgered musician is never very gripping."

The Monthly Film Bulletin wrote that the early police procedural scenes "make a powerful contribution to the effectiveness of the film's first part", but that Rose's hospitalization felt like a "dramatically gratuitous development, particularly as its demands are ill met by the actress concerned", and that the final act of the film suffered a "slow decline into a flatly factual ending".

Variety called the film "a gripping piece of realism" that builds to a "powerful climax, the events providing director a field day in his art of characterization and suspense".

Harrison's Reports was also positive, calling it "grim but absorbing melodramatic fare", with Henry Fonda and Vera Miles "highly effective" in their roles.

Jean-Luc Godard, in his lengthy treatise on the film, wrote, "The only suspense in The Wrong Man is that of chance itself. The subject of this film lies less in the unexpectedness of events than in their probability. With each shot, each transition, each composition, Hitchcock does the only thing possible for the rather paradoxical but compelling reason that he could do anything he liked."

The film ranked fourth on Cahiers du Cinéma's Top 10 Films of the Year List in 1957.

The film holds an approval rating of 93% on Rotten Tomatoes, based on reviews from 27 surveyed critics, with an average rating of 8.1/10.

Glenn Kenny, writing for RogerEbert.com in 2016, stated that the film may be the "least fun" of Hitchcock's Hollywood period, but that it "is as fluently styled a movie as Hitchcock ever made".

Richard Brody of The New Yorker wrote that "few films play so tightly on the contrast between unimpeachably concrete details and the vertiginous pretenses of reality. Hitchcock’s ultimate point evokes cosmic terror: innocence is merely a trick of paperwork, whereas guilt is the human condition."

In 1998, Jonathan Rosenbaum of the Chicago Reader included the film in his unranked list of the best American films not included on the AFI Top 100.

== Legacy ==
Manny Balestrero sued the city for false arrest. Asking $500,000, he accepted a settlement of just $7,000. He earned $22,000 from the film (which he reportedly liked), and it went to repaying loans for Rose's care, although she never fully recovered, dying in 1982. Manny died in 1998.

A street in Jackson Heights, Queens, is named "Manny 'The Wrong Man' Balestrero Way", at 73rd Street and 41st Avenue. The street is not far from the former real-life Balestrero home.

Because the film is based on a true story, it led some police forces in America to review their procedures in regard to the identification of suspects.
