= Gregory Balestrero =

American industrial engineer (born 1947)

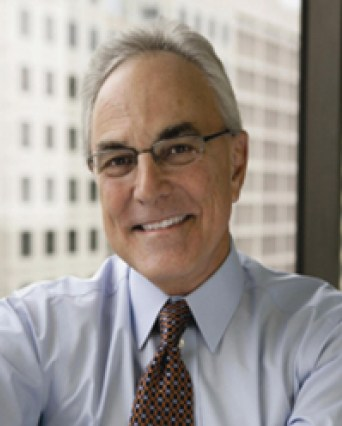
Gregory Balestrero

Gregory Balestrero (born July 16, 1947 in New York City) is an American industrial engineer, and CEO emeritus of the Project Management Institute. He has a record of overseeing administrative, financial and internal affairs for professional associations.

== Biography ==
Gregory Balestrero is the son of Christopher Emmanuel and Rose (Giolito) Balestrero. His father's arrest in a case of mistaken identity was the subject of a book by Maxwell Anderson and of Alfred Hitchcock's 1956 movie The Wrong Man.

In 1970 Gregory Balestrero earned a bachelor's degree in industrial engineering from the Georgia Institute of Technology. From 1994 to 2002, he served as executive director of the Construction Specifications Institute (CSI), an organization for construction professionals in non-residential building construction, based in Alexandria, Virginia, US. He previously held the position of executive director at the Institute of Industrial Engineers (IIE), headquartered in Norcross, Georgia, where he has been serving as acting executive director since 1987. Between 2002 and 2010 he was president and CEO of the Project Management Institute.

Balestrero served as the 2003-2004 board chairman of the Greater Washington Society of Association Executives (GWSAE) and an active member and former president of the Council of Engineering and Scientific Society Executives (CESSE). Balestrero also is a member of the Committee of 100, of the U.S. Chamber of Commerce. He is a current member of the American Society of Association Executives (ASAE), where he serves on the board of directors for ASAE’s Center for Association Leadership (CAL); the Institute of Industrial Engineers (IIE); and the American Society of Mechanical Engineers (ASME).

Balestrero was honored with a fellowship in the World Academy of Productivity Scientists and is an honorary member of Alpha Pi Mu, an industrial engineering honor society. In 2004 he received China's 2004 Friendship Award at the Great Hall of the People in Beijing.

In March 2012, Balestrero joined International Institute for Learning, where he serves as a Strategic Adviser for a new program addressing Corporate Consciousness, Leadership and Sustainability.

== Project Management Institute ==
Gregory Balestrero moved to the Project Management Institute (PMI), when in 2002 he became its president and CEO. He succeeded Virgil R. Carter, former executive director of the Institute. Balestrero continued the rapid expansion started during Carter's tenure, almost tripling the number of members in seven years. His two primary goals for PMI were: building a superior project management practice and gaining global acceptance for the profession. During his tenure, PMI has grown from 93,000 in 2002 to over 260,000 members in 2008 in over 150 countries worldwide.

On January 15, 2011, he retired and became CEO emeritus at the Project Management Institute. He was succeeded by Mark A. Langley, former executive vice president and chief operating officer at PMI.

== Organizational survival ==
After retiring from the Project Management Institute in 2011, Balestrero traveled around the world delivering keynote addresses and consulting with business leaders about the challenges of a global business economy faced with instability and limited resources. His experiences led Greg to co-author Organizational Survival: Profitable Strategies for a Sustainable Future with business strategist Nathalie Udo.
