= ISO 21500 =

Guidance on project management

ISO 21500, Guidance on Project Management, is an international standard developed by the International Organization for Standardization, or ISO starting in 2007 and released in 2012. It was intended to provide generic guidance, explain core principles and what constitutes good practice in project management. The ISO technical committee dealing with project management, ISO/PC 236 was held by the American National Standards Institute (ANSI) which had approved four standards that used Project Management Institute (PMI) materials, one of which was ANSI/PMI 99-001-2008, A Guide to the Project Management Body of Knowledge - 4th Edition (PMI BoK® Guide - 4th Edition).

ISO plans for this standard (21500) to be the first in a family of project management standards. ISO also designed this standard to align with other, related standards such as ISO 10005:2005 Quality management systems − Guidelines for quality plans, ISO 10006:2003 Quality management systems − Guidelines for quality management in projects, ISO 10007:2003 Quality management systems − Guidelines for configuration management, ISO 31000:2009 Risk management – Principles and guidelines.

== Background ==
The process approach to project management developed in the 1980s, largely in Europe. The main focus of this approach is the use of structured processes throughout project execution in order to achieve its objectives. Project management then is a structured process about converting a vision into reality and the major emphasis was on developing and defining processes in order to meet project objectives. Research has demonstrated that organizational effectiveness is a direct function of the decision-making criteria and goal-centered activities embedded in processes and implicitly, a process-based approach to project management.

Project life cycles come out of this process approach to project management. In fact, several core concepts in the Project Management Body of Knowledge are based upon the process based to project management, particularly, project management processes, integration management, and the management of quality and risk.

== Overview ==
ISO 21500 was developed to offer guidance on the concepts and processes of project management with the goal of implementing processes and best practices to improve project management performance. While the standard describes important concepts and processes of project management it does not provide detailed guidance and general management topics are limited to relevant aspects of project management. The standard as developed by the ISO was modeled on the Project Management Institute's Body of Knowledge (PMBoK), although there are some key differences.

The ISO project management standard is only 47 pages long and is limited to the introduction of the processes, their inputs, and their outputs. The PMI standard is more than 450 pages in length and describes processes, inputs, outputs and associated tools and techniques. Both organizations use the concept of process as an integral part of project management. ISO and PMI segregate project processes into five process groups with some minor variances in labeling. The differences between the two standards is minimal with respect to process groups and subjects/knowledge areas. The substantive difference between the two standards is with the detail and description of tools and techniques, because ISO 21500:2012 does not provide it. Another major change is the introduction of a new subject by ISO, namely, "stakeholder management".

== Criticism ==
One reviewer noted that the ISO 21500 project management processes were probably more useful in a cascade approach to scope definition as an alternative to using iterative approaches and therefore less attractive for project-oriented organizations. Similarly, for the PMBoK, the major development in this coordinated approach was the requirement that a knowledge area always starts with the associated management plan.

== ISO 21500 certification ==
Since ISO 21500:2012 is a guidance document, it is not intended to be used for certification/registration purposes.

== History ==
Year	Description
2012	ISO 21500 (1st Edition)
2020	ISO 21502 (Reissued as a 1st Edition when ISO 21500:2021 became "Project, programme and portfolio management — Context and concepts")

== See also ==
- ASCE Body of Knowledge project (or ASCE BoK)
- Project management
