= Material =

Substance or mixture of substances that constitutes an object

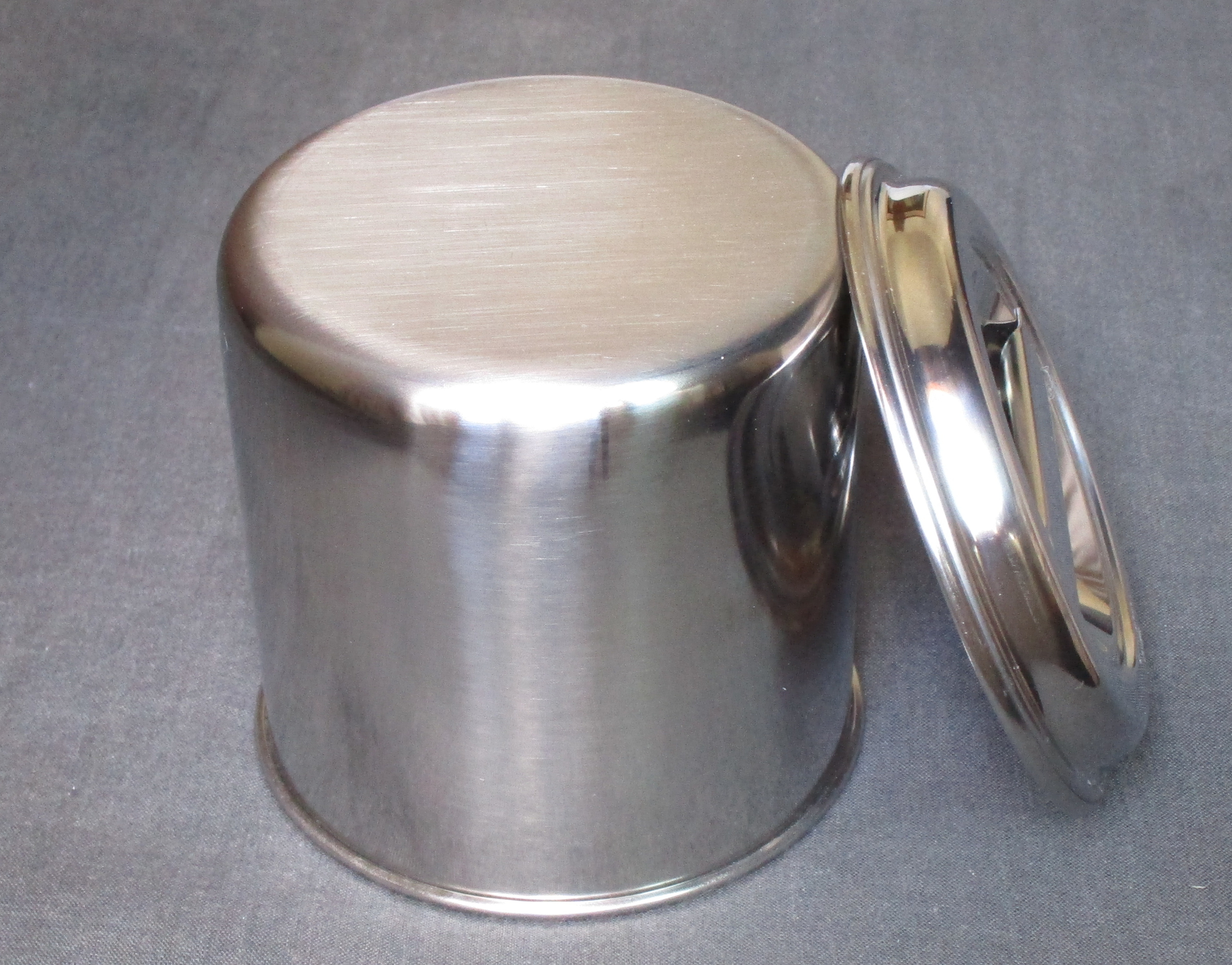
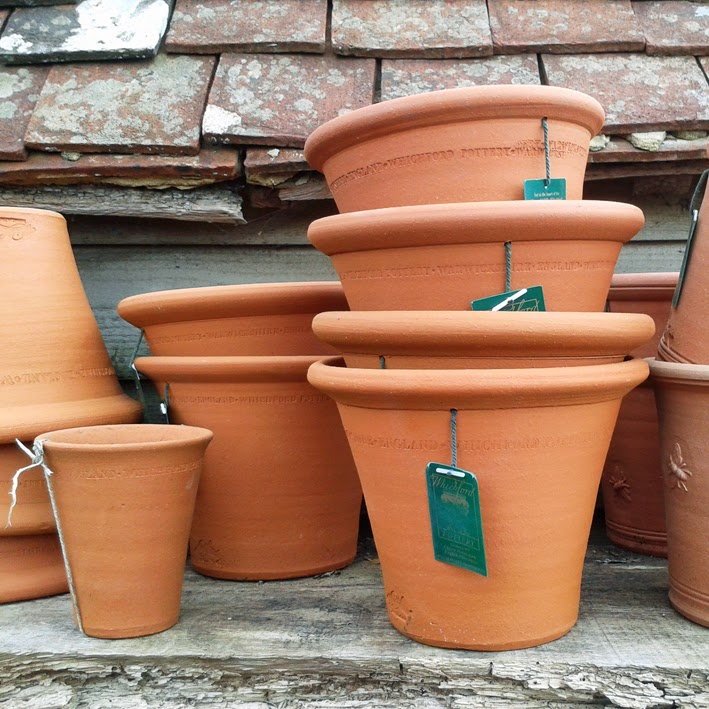
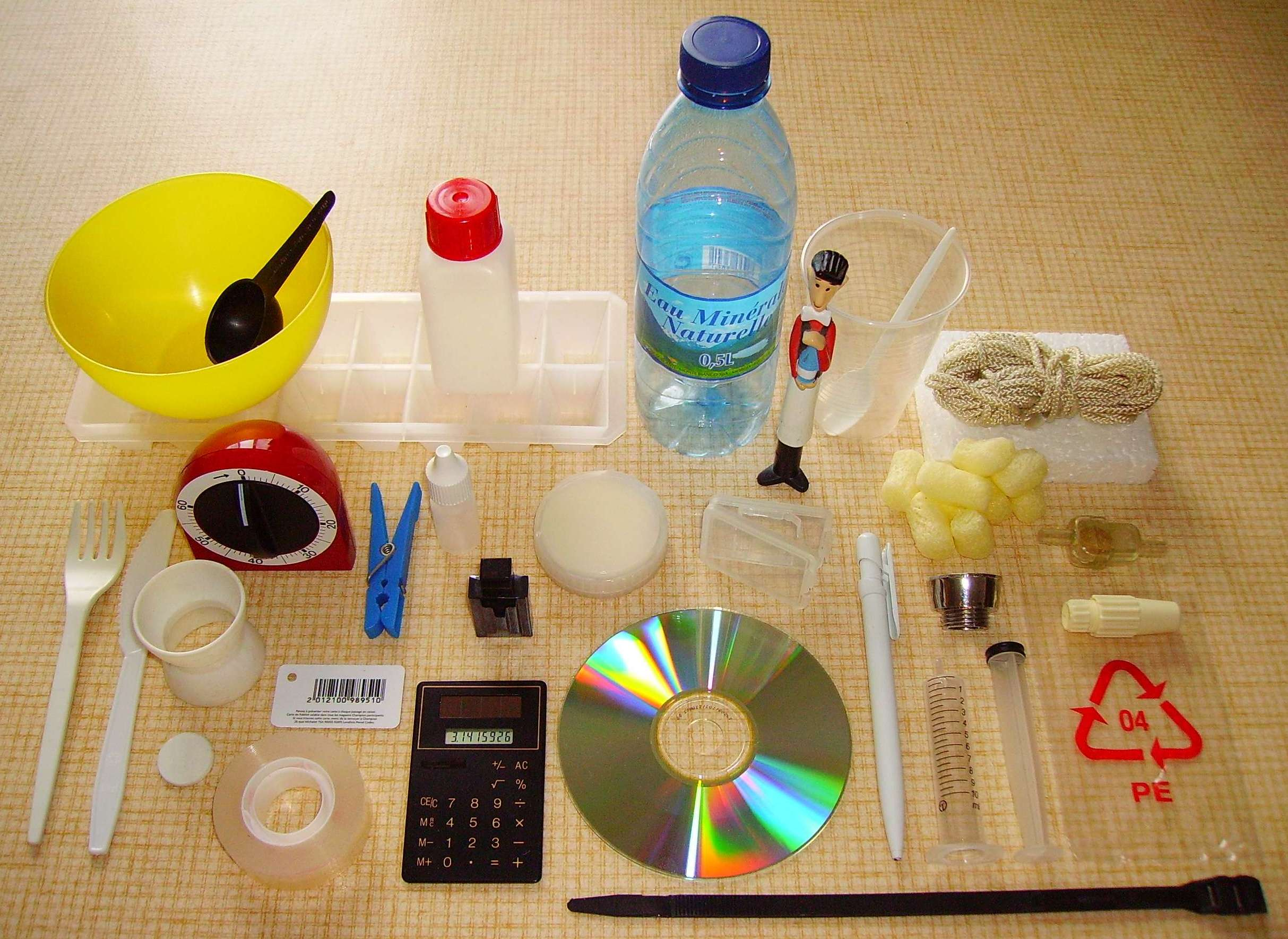
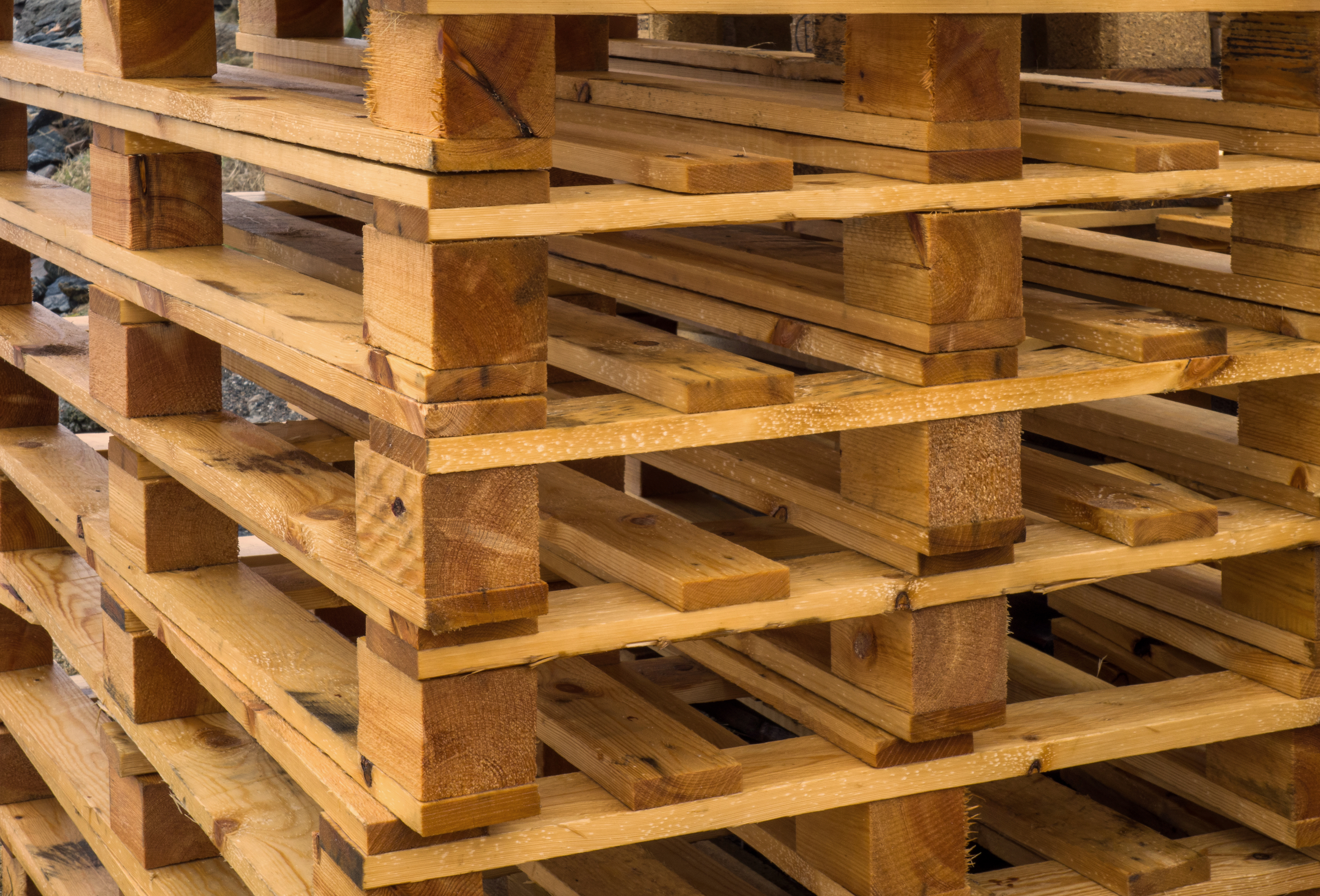
Various different materials classified by microstructure. Clockwise from top-left: steel kitchen container (metals), terracotta flowerpots (ceramics), wooden pallets (composites), and plastics (polymers).

A material is a substance or mixture of substances that constitutes an object. Materials can be pure or impure, living or non-living matter. Materials can be classified on the basis of their physical and chemical properties, or on their geological origin or biological function. Materials science is the study of materials, their properties, and their applications.

Raw materials can be processed in different ways to influence their properties, by purification, shaping or the introduction of other materials. New materials can be produced from raw materials by synthesis.

In industry, materials are inputs to manufacturing processes to produce products or more complex materials, and the nature and quantity of materials used may form part of the calculation for the cost of a product or delivery under contract, Such as where contract costS are calculated on a "time and materials" basis.

== Historical elements ==
Materials chart the history of humanity. The three prehistoric ages (Stone Age, Bronze Age, Iron Age) were succeeded by historical ages: steel age in the 19th century, polymer age in the middle of the following century (plastic age) and Silicon age in the Second half of the 20th century.

== Classification by use ==
Materials can be broadly categorized in terms of their use, for example:

- Building materials are used for construction
- Building insulation materials are used to retain heat within buildings
- Refractory materials are used for high-temperature applications
- Nuclear materials are used for nuclear power and weapons
- Aerospace materials are used in aircraft and other aerospace applications
- Biomaterials are used for applications interacting with living systems

Material selection is a process to determine which material should be used for a given application.

== Classification by structure ==
The relevant structure of materials has a different length scale depending on the material. The structure and composition of a material can be determined by microscopy or spectroscopy.

=== Microstructure ===
In engineering, materials can be categorized according to their microscopic structure:

- Plastics: a wide range of synthetic or semi-synthetic materials that use polymers as a main ingredient.
- Ceramics: non-metal, inorganic solids
- Glasses: amorphous solids
- Crystals: a solid material whose constituents (such as atoms, molecules, or ions) are arranged in a highly ordered microscopic structure, forming a crystal lattice that extends in all directions.
- Metals: pure or combined chemical elements with specific chemical bonding behavior
- Alloys: a mixture of chemical elements of which at least one is often a metal.
- Polymers: materials based on long carbon or silicon chains
- Hybrids: Combinations of multiple materials, for example composites.

=== Larger-scale structure ===
A metamaterial is any material engineered to have a property that is not found in naturally occurring materials, usually by combining several materials to form a composite and / or tuning the shape, geometry, size, orientation and arrangement to achieve the desired property.

In foams and textiles, the chemical structure is less relevant to immediately observable properties than larger-scale material features: the holes in foams, and the weave in textiles.

== Classification by properties ==
Materials can be compared and classified by their large-scale physical properties.

=== Mechanical properties ===
Mechanical properties determine how a material responds to applied forces. Examples include: Stiffness, Strength, Toughness, and Hardness.

=== Thermal properties ===
Materials may degrade or undergo changes of properties at different temperatures. Thermal properties also include the material's thermal conductivity and heat capacity, relating to the transfer and storage of thermal energy by the material.

=== Other properties ===
Materials can be compared and categorized by any quantitative measure of their behavior under various conditions. Notable additional properties include the optical, electrical, and magnetic behavior of materials.

== See also ==
- Hyle, the Greek term, relevant for the philosophy of matter
- Category:Materials
