= Project Management Body of Knowledge =

Body of knowledge for project management

A Guide to the Project Management Body of Knowledge (the PMBOK Guide)
- First edition
- Author: Project Management Institute
- Genre: Business
- Published: 2025 (Project Management Institute)
- Pages: 370 (seventh edition)
- ISBN: 978-1-62825-664-2

The Project Management Body of Knowledge (PMBOK) is a set of standard terminology and guidelines (a body of knowledge) for project management. The body of knowledge evolves over time and is presented in A Guide to the Project Management Body of Knowledge (PMBOK Guide), a book which eighth edition was released in 2025. This document results from work overseen by the Project Management Institute (PMI), which offers certifications for Certified Associate in Project Management (CAPM) and Project Management Professional (PMP).

Much of the PMBOK Guide is unique to project management such as critical path method and work breakdown structure (WBS). The PMBOK Guide also overlaps with general management regarding planning, organising, staffing, executing and controlling the operations of an organisation. Other management disciplines which overlap with the PMBOK Guide include financial forecasting, organisational behaviour, management science, budgeting and other planning methods.

== History ==
Earlier versions of the PMBOK Guide were recognized as standards by the American National Standards Institute (ANSI) which assigns standards in the United States (ANSI/PMI 99-001-2008) and the Institute of Electrical and Electronics Engineers (IEEE 1490–2011).

The evolution of the PMBOK Guide is reflected in editions of the Guide.

Year	Title	Revision summary
1996	PMBOK Guide	Published in 1996 by the Project Management Institute (PMI), this document evolved from a white paper published in 1983 called the "Ethics, Standards, and Accreditation Committee Final Report" with a different title and significantly reorganized.
2000	PMBOK Guide, 2000 Edition	The second edition (published as the 2000 Edition) added new material reflecting the growth of practices.
2004	PMBOK Guide, Third Edition	The third edition (2004) was a significant edit from the earlier editions, changing criteria for inclusion from "generally accepted" practice to "generally recognized as good practice".
2008	PMBOK Guide, Fourth Edition	
2013	PMBOK Guide, Fifth Edition	
2017	PMBOK Guide, Sixth Edition	The sixth edition (September 2017) added several topics and included agile practices for the first time.
2021	PMBOK Guide, Seventh Edition	The seventh edition (2021) presents major structural changes, such as replacing the 10 knowledge areas with 12 principles and including agile practices more comprehensively.
2025	PMBOK Guide, Eighth Edition	The eighth edition (2025) refreshed terminology and updated concepts, introduced six principles for effective project management and integrated technical ways of working into seven performance domains.

The PMBOK Guide, Eighth Edition signals a change in direction by emphasizing the crucial importance of a project's value delivery, with a new definition of a project as a "temporary initiative in a unique context undertaken to create value." It also states, three times, that "all projects are investments" and incorporates in its Glossary three new investment-related techniques: the value breakdown structure (VBS) (p. 172), critical path drag (p. 160) and critical path drag cost (p. 160).

== Purpose ==
The PMBOK Guide is intended to be a "subset of the project management body of knowledge" that is generally recognized as a good practice. 'Generally recognized' means the knowledge and practices described are applicable to most projects most of the time and there is a consensus about their value and usefulness. 'Good practice' means there is a general agreement that the application of the knowledge, skills, tools, and techniques can enhance the chance of success over many projects." This means that sometimes the "latest" project management trends, often promoted by consultants, may not be part of the latest version of The PMBOK Guide.

However, the 6th Edition of the PMBOK Guide now includes an "Agile Practice Guide".

== Contents ==
The PMBOK Guide is process-based, meaning it describes work as being accomplished by processes. This approach is consistent with other management standards such as ISO 9000 and the Software Engineering Institute's CMMI. Processes overlap and interact throughout a project or its various phases.

- Inputs (documents, plans, designs, etc.)
- Tools and Techniques (mechanisms applied to inputs)
- Outputs (documents, plans, designs, etc.)

A Guide to the Project Management Body of Knowledge — Sixth Edition provides guidelines for managing individual projects and defines project management related concepts. It also describes the project management life cycle and its related processes, as well as the project life cycle. For the first time, "Agile Practice Guide" is included.

The PMBOK as described in the Guide recognizes 49 processes that fall into five basic process groups and ten knowledge areas that are typical of most projects, most of the time.

=== Process groups ===
The five process groups are:

1. Initiating: processes performed to define a new project or a new phase of an existing project by obtaining authorization to start the project or phase.
2. Planning: Those processes required to establish the scope of the project, refine the objectives, and define the course of action required to attain the objectives that the project was undertaken to achieve.
3. Executing: Those processes performed to complete the work defined in the project management plan to satisfy the project specifications
4. Monitoring and Controlling: Those processes required to track, review, and regulate the progress and performance of the project; identify any areas in which changes to the plan are required; and initiate the corresponding changes.
5. Closing: Those processes performed to finalize all activities across all Process Groups to formally close the project or phase.

=== Knowledge areas ===
The ten knowledge areas, each of which contains some or all of the project management processes, are:

1. Project Integration Management : the processes and activities needed to identify, define, combine, unify, and coordinate the various processes and project management activities within the project management process groups.
2. Project Scope management : the processes required to ensure that the project includes all the work required, and only the work required, to complete the project successfully.
3. Project Schedule Management : the processes are required to manage the timely completion of the project. Until the 6th edition of the PMBOK Guide launched this was called "Project Time Management"
4. Project Cost Management : the processes involved in planning, estimating, budgeting, financing, funding, managing, and controlling costs so that the project can be completed within the approved budget.
5. Project Quality Management : the processes and activities of the performing organization that determine quality policies, objectives, and responsibilities so that the project will satisfy the needs for which it was undertaken.
6. Project Resource Management : the processes that organize, manage, and lead the project team. Until the 6th edition of the PMBOK Guide this was called "Project Human Resource Management"
7. Project Communications Management : the processes that are required to ensure timely and appropriate planning, collection, creation, distribution, storage, retrieval, management, control, monitoring, and the ultimate disposition of project information.
8. Project Risk Management : the processes of conducting risk management planning, identification, analysis, response planning, and controlling risk on a project.
9. Project Procurement Management : the processes necessary to purchase or acquire products, services, or results needed from outside the project team. Processes in this area include Procurement Planning, Solicitation Planning, Solicitation, Source Selection, Contract Administration, and Contract Closeout.
10. Project Stakeholder Engagement : the processes required to identify all people or organizations impacted by the project, analyzing stakeholder expectations and impact on the project, and developing appropriate management strategies for effectively engaging stakeholders in project decisions and execution.

Each of the ten knowledge areas contains the processes that need to be accomplished within its discipline in order to achieve effective project management. Each of these processes also falls into one of the five process groups, creating a matrix structure such that every process can be related to one knowledge area and one process group.

== Extensions ==
While the PMBOK Guide is meant to offer a general guide to manage most projects most of the time, there are currently three official extensions:

- Software Extension to the PMBOK Guide
- Construction Extension to the PMBOK Guide
- Government Extension to the PMBOK Guide

== Criticism and alternatives ==
The PMBOK is a widely accepted standard in project management, however there are alternatives to the PMBOK standard, and PMBOK does have its critics. One thrust of critique has come from the critical chain developers and followers (e.g. Eliyahu M. Goldratt and Lawrence P. Leach), as opposed to critical path method adherents. The PMBOK Guide section on Project Time Management does indicate Critical Chain as an alternative method to Critical Path.

A second strand of criticism originates in Lean Construction. This approach emphasises the lack of two way communication in the PMBOK model and offers an alternative which emphasises a language/action perspective and continual improvement in the planning process.

== See also ==
- ISO 10006 for Quality Management on Projects
- ISO 21500 for Project Management
- ISO 31000 for Risk Management
- Pmhub
- PMP
- PRINCE2
