= ISO 10006 =

Guidelines for quality management in projects

ISO 10006:2018, Quality management systems - Guidelines for quality management in projects, is an international standard developed by the International Organization for Standardization.

ISO 10006:2018 gives guidance on the application of quality management in projects. It supersedes ISO 10006:2003.

== Basic principles ==
ISO 10006 is applicable to organizations working on projects of varying complexity, small or large, of short or long duration, being an individual project to being part of a programme or portfolio of projects, in different environments, and irrespective of the kind of product/service or process involved, with the intention of satisfying project interested parties by introducing quality management in projects. This can necessitate some tailoring of the guidance to suit a particular project.

ISO 10006 defines a project as "unique process undertaken to achieve an objective". A project generally consists of a set of coordinated and controlled activities with start and finish dates, conforming to specific requirements, including the constraints of time, cost and resources.

== Linked standards ==
ISO 10006 is not a guide to "project management" itself. Guidance on quality in project management processes is discussed in this International Standard. Guidance on quality in a project's product-related processes, and on the "process approach", is covered in ISO 9004. A new "Project Management - Guide to project Management" ISO 21500 has been published in September 2012.

Since ISO 10006 is a guidance document, it is not intended to be used for certification/registration purposes.

== See also ==
- Clinical trial
- List of ISO standards
- Project management
- Quality management system
