= Team Based Learning Organization =

Team Based Learning Organisation (TBLO) indicates a convergence of the following concepts used in organization development:

- Team Based Organization
- Learning Organization
- Team Based Learning

It emerged in an approximately 40 years long process of changes in the industrial world which evolved from an industrial society into a knowledge society.

== Context ==
The shift from an industrial society, to information society and from information society to knowledge society brings profound changes in the way of looking at workforce and corporate culture in organizations. The blue collar concept prevailing in taylorism (scientific management) and the white collar concept of for information workers seemed to become increasingly obsolete according to many authors starting with William Deming and his method of quality circles.

Since the 1970s, Chris Argyris' contributions about organizational learning paved the way to new concepts in considering and managing human resources. More particularly, Argyris introduced the concept of "Double Loop Learning". He intended that not only workforce had to learn from the organization in order to perform properly their job, but the organization had to learn from the workforce, including in strategic issues. In 1990, Peter Senge published “The fifth discipline” together with a field book intended to show practical applications. Amongst four other disciplines in management, the fifth which was intended to be systems thinking, a skill highly appreciated by Senge and, according to him, missing in most top management teams. At the same time Edgar Schein stressed the importance of values, organizational culture and of leadership as key elements for success. In a latter publication, Schein seems to agree with Argyris in taking into serious consideration contributions bottom up.

In the industries HP was an early mover. Bill Hewlett and Dave Packard had an early and thorough understanding about the role organizations should play in society and about how to integrate in the most positive way the knowledge and the relational network of their workforce. “The HP Way” was probably a concept which made the difference in setting up a very effective organization culture at HP. Teamwork was a key skill people who joined HP had to learn quickly. To do so, coaches and trainers took care of teams and of newly joined workforce. In this context was coined the term “Team Based Organization”.

== Origin of the term ==
In Europe, it was the newly created University of Applied Sciences Western Switzerland which charged one of its professors to explore advanced management models in order to create a state of art master program compliant with European intellectual standards. As a result, the Master of Advanced Studies in Human Systems Engineering was launched in 2002 by Prof. Christa Muth and her team. She integrated the lessons learned in the three precedent decades by various authors with a thorough systems, life and human sciences approach in order to provide a robust framework independent from “fashion in management” and from empiricism without theoretic background. Muth integrated in this master program an effective field approach she had tested in her extensive experience in consulting for organizations of all sizes and kinds. The intent was to get organizations prepared to manage complexity, change and innovation.

Muth coined the term “Team Based Learning Organization” as the auspicable direction organizations should choose if they have to tackle complexity and innovation. As during her academic career Muth was not a prolific writer, the concept was initially spread by her students and clients and found its own way to consultants who use it with their clients.

== Management principles ==
In order to establish a TBLO, four management principles are essential:

1. Orientation on meaning and purpose: Managing by objectives limits people in their use of contextual intelligence; more, objectives tend to become quickly obsolete as realities change. Hence it is good to have people really on board as far as the “why we do things and for whom” tends to become more important than “what we should do”. When changes occur – and this happens with an increasing rhythm – people can react intelligently rather than in compliance with the target sheet of the MBO. Many other advantages result from being familiar and in line with meaning, as e.g. higher identification with the company, better retention scores etc.
2. Complementarity: Having people to perform not only in the area of their expertise but also in their work preference increases team performance. Sometimes it my request changes in work allocation or even in organization charts. Several methods are available to map work preferences (MBTI, Leonardo 3.4.5, Belbin, TMS, etc.). This allows a team to benefit from the necessary diversity of talents and intellectual resources.
3. Subsidiarity: Team members must feel collectively committed not only to the meaning and purpose of the organization, but also to the individual well being of each member as far as questions arising from the work situation are concerned, such as work overload, lack of information or skills, etc. Helping or being helped should be a very common way of sharing knowledge and responsibility.
4. Self-organization: When the three principles above are met, self-organization can take place. In this case teams can enter a "collective flow experience" characterised by a high level of work satisfaction, a strong bonding between team members and an exceptional level of independence and performance. Self-organization is the "black belt" of TBLO: it supposes an advanced understanding of management and the ability to let go as far as questions of power and prestige are concerned.

The way towards self-organization usually takes organizations through a learning process which lasts usually 2 to 4 years. The conditions for success are:

- the determination of management to go all the way despite inevitable difficulties and doubts,
- sufficiently stable teams (good retention scores),
- a skilled facilitation by a consultant who understands the concept to the full extent.

== Later close concepts ==
In the wake of Human Systems Engineering close concepts were developed by other authors.

- Emerging change was developed by Madeleine Laugeri on the basis of Eric Berne ’s theories (The Structures and Dynamics of Organizations and Groups). Laugeri was one of the professors in the Master Program Human Systems Engineering.
- Fractal organization by Michel Henric-Coll.

== See also ==
- Organizational learning
- System Dynamics
- Systems thinking
- Strategic management
