= Guaranteed maximum price =

A guaranteed maximum price (also known as GMP, not-to-exceed price, NTE, or NTX) contract is a cost-type contract (also known as an open-book contract) such that the contractor is compensated for actual costs incurred plus a fixed fee, which is limited to a maximum price. The contractor is responsible for cost overruns greater than the guaranteed maximum price unless the GMP has been increased by a formal change order (only as a result of additional scope from the client, not from price overruns, errors, or omissions). Savings resulting from unexpectedly low costs are returned to the client.

This is different from a fixed-price contract, also known as stipulated price contract or lump-sum contract whereby cost savings are typically retained by the contractor and essentially become additional profits.

== See also ==
- Time and materials
