= Project Management Professional =

Internationally recognized professional designation

Project Management Professional (PMP) is an internationally recognized professional designation offered by the Project Management Institute (PMI). As of 31 July 2020, there are 1,036,368 active PMP-certified individuals and 314 chartered chapters across 214 countries and territories worldwide.

The exam is one of eight credentials offered by PMI and is based on the ECO PMP Examination Content Outline. Most of the questions reference the Exam Content Outline PMP Examination Content Outline (also known as the E.C.O).

== Exam syllabus ==
The PMP exam is based on Exam Content Outline (ECO). The ECO is revised every 4-5 years by PMI. Since January 2021, the exam is tested on three different domains:

1. People (42%)
2. Process (50%)
3. Business Environment (8%)

Prior to January 2021, the exam was based on tasks from five performance domains or process groups, encompassing a total of 49 processes. The PMP Examination Specification weighted these groups as follows:

1. Initiating the project (13%)
2. Planning the project (24%)
3. Executing the project (31%)
4. Monitoring and controlling the project (25%)
5. Closing the project (7%)

The exam consists of 180 multiple-choice questions written against the PMBOK specification and the PMP Code of Ethics. The exam is closed-book; no reference materials are allowed. Five of the 180 questions on the exam are "sample" questions used to fine-tune the degree of difficulty and precision of the exam and as such are not counted for or against a test taker. These questions are placed randomly throughout the exam. The test taker is only graded on their proficiency on 175 questions. The numbers in parentheses describe the percentage of questions for each domain.

Mapped to these five process groups are ten project management Knowledge Areas:

1. Project Integration Management
2. Project Scope Management
3. Project Schedule Management
4. Project Cost Management
5. Project Quality Management
6. Project Resource Management
7. Project Communications Management
8. Project Risk Management
9. Project Procurement Management
10. Project Stakeholder Management

The processes of these knowledge areas are described by their inputs, tools and techniques, and outputs. The PMBOK also emphasizes the interaction and interdependence between different process groups. For example, the outputs from one process may be used by one or more other processes as inputs.

Announced in June 2019, the PMP Examination Content Outline will undergo significant re-categorization, effective January 2021, which prescribe three all-new performance domains:

1. People (42%)
2. Process (50%)
3. Business Environment (8%)

== Purpose ==
Government, commercial and other organizations employ PMP-certified project managers in an attempt to improve the success rate of projects in all areas of knowledge, by applying a standardized and evolving set of project management principles as contained in PMI's PMBOK Guide.

In December 2005, the PMP credential was number 7 of ZDNet's 10 best IT certifications. In 2012 the PMP credential was ranked as a top certification by CIO. In 2015, the PMP credential was ranked as the #4 certification by Global Knowledge, behind 3 Security certifications.

== Examination process ==
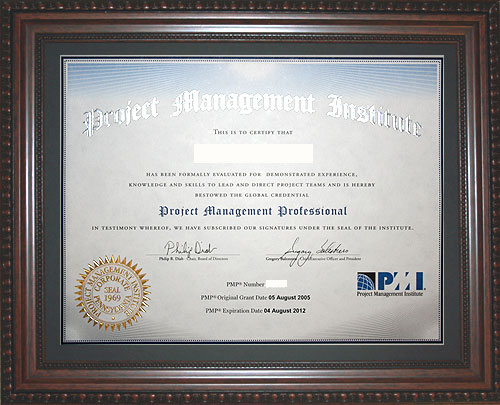
An example of a certificate issued by the PMI to candidates who pass the Project Management Professional Exam.

The global network of Pearson VUE testing centers provides the PMP exam as a computer-based test. They also offer a paper-based option for locations with no nearby Prometric testing centers. The exam consists of 180 questions ("items"). Five are pre-release items, which are not included in exam scoring. Prometric calculates the score based on the other 175 items. Each multiple-choice item has one correct answer and three incorrect answers.

Candidates who take the computer-based test receive their results (passed or not passed) immediately upon completion. PMI also evaluates proficiency levels in each project management process group in 4 levels: Above Target, Target, Below Target, and Needs Improvement. Examiners provide these results to the candidate on a score report after the examination. Candidates who take paper-based tests receive their test results and score reports typically within 4 weeks.

== Item writing ==
Item writing is an ongoing process at PMI, and they periodically add new four-choice questions (items) and remove others. Item writers use the PMP Examination Specification to identify item contents and references (project management texts or standards) to verify correctness. Individuals who are active in the field of PMP exam preparation (such as trainers, courseware developers, and book authors) may not participate in item writing.

== Prerequisites to become eligible ==
Candidates must meet the prerequisites in one of the following groups to be eligible for PMP Certification:

=== Group A ===
- Four-Year College / University Degree
- 36 months leading projects within the past 8 years
- 35 hours of project management education/training or CAPM (Certified Associate in Project Management) Certification.

=== Group B ===
- A high school diploma or an associate’s degree (or global equivalent)
- 60 months leading projects
- 35 hours of project management education/training or CAPM Certification

== Continuous credential requirements ==
Continuous credential requirements are also called CCRs. To maintain the PMP qualification, 60 professional development units (PDUs) must be earned over a three-year cycle, from activities such as researching, authoring articles, speaking on project management-related topics, or being engaged full-time in project management. Credential holders may earn PDUs towards the maintenance of their credential through formal academic courses or courses offered by a provider (R.E.P. or Component). However, these are only two of the five categories of PDU earning opportunities in which a credential holder may participate.

Effective 1 December 2015, CCRs were updated to align with the employer-identified skills depicted in the PMI Talent Triangle, a combination of technical, leadership, and strategic and business management expertise, to ensure credential holders are equipped with skills relevant in a continually changing business environment.

== Credential value and alternatives ==
The US Department of Education and the National Science Foundation have deemed all United States professional certifications to be at level 50 in the Mapping The World of Education, Comparable Database System (Volume Two: Codes for Program Completion Awards by Country). The Level 50 code addresses "Postsecondary Programs and Awards of No More Than 2 Years. Programs and awards that are designed to represent no more than 2 years of study; constitute postsecondary education as operationally defined in CDS; and are not second (graduate-level) programs and awards."

PRINCE2 certifications could be seen as a competitor of Project Management Professional (PMP). In general, the US and American countries prefer PMP, and UK, Australia and Europe prefer PRINCE2. Asia, Africa and the Middle East area have no strong preference for one or the other. The organizations behind these two certifications acknowledge each other's existence in their advertising material and attempt to position themselves as complementary products – PRINCE2 as a methodology, and the subject of the PMP certification (such as the PMBOK Guide) as a guide or standard – which can be used alongside each other. In practice, companies and practitioners choose one system or both due to the project environment, their geographical location and costs involved.
