= Project cost management =

Project Cost Management (PCM) is the dimension of project management which aims to ensure that a project is completed within its approved budget. It encompasses several specific project management activities including estimating, job controls, field data collection, scheduling, accounting and design, and uses technology to measure cost and productivity through the full life-cycle of enterprise level projects.

According to the Project Management Body of Knowledge (PMBOK), PCM's primary concern is the cost of the resources needed to complete the project. However, PMBOK also notes that PCM should also consider the impact of project management decisions on customers' wider or life-cycle costs such as the use of the building or IT system generated by the project.

Beginning with estimating, a vital tool in PCM, actual historical data is used to accurately plan all aspects of the project. As the project continues, job control uses data from the estimate with the information reported from the field to measure the cost and production in the project. From project initiation to completion, project cost management has an objective to simplify and cheapen the project experience.

This technological approach has been a big challenger to the mainstream estimating software and project management industries.
