= Fixed-price contract =

Contract whose price does not change based on incurred costs

A fixed-price contract is a type of contract for the supply of goods or services, such that the agreed payment amount will not subsequently be adjusted to reflect the resources used, costs incurred or time expended by the contractor. This contract type may be contrasted with a cost-plus contract, which is intended to cover the costs incurred by the contractor plus an additional amount for profit, and with time-and-materials contracts and labor-hour contracts. Fixed-price contracts are one of the main options available when contracting for supplies to governments.

Fixed prices can require more time, in advance, for sellers to determine the price of each item. However, the fixed-price items can each be purchased faster, but bargaining could set the price for an entire set of items being purchased, reducing the time for bulk purchases. Also, fixed-price items can help in pre-determining the value of an inventory, such as for insurance estimates.

Such contracts continue to be popular despite a history of failed or troubled projects, although they tend to work when costs are well known in advance. Some laws mandate a preference for fixed-price contracts, however, many people maintain that such contracts are actually the most expensive, especially when the risks or costs are unknown in advance.

According to the Project Management Body of Knowledge (7th edition) by the Project Management Institute (PMI), fixed-price contract is an "agreement that sets the fee that will be paid for a defined scope of work regardless of the cost or effort to deliver it".

== Contract types ==
The United States' Federal Acquisition Regulation (FAR) provides for the following types of contract with a fixed price element:

- Firm-fixed-price contract (FAR 16.202)
- Fixed-price contract with economic price adjustment (FAR 16.203)
- Fixed-price contract with prospective price redetermination (FAR 16.205)
- Fixed-ceiling-price contract with retroactive price redetermination (FAR 16.206)
- Firm-fixed-price, level-of-effort term contract (FAR 16.207)
- Fixed-price incentive contract (FAR 16.403)
- Fixed-price incentive (firm target) contract (FAR 16.403-1)
- Fixed-price incentive (successive targets) contract (FAR 16.403-2)
- Fixed-price contract with award fees (FAR 16.404).

Economic price adjustment may take account of increases or decreases from an established and agreed-upon price level, actual costs or a price index.

=== Firm Fixed Price Contract (FFP) ===
According to the PMBOK (7th edition) by the Project Management Institute (PMI), Firm Fixed Price Contract (FFP) is a "fixed-price contract where the buyer pays the seller a set amount (as defined by the contract), regardless of the seller's costs". The contractor or vendor usually bears all the risk of cost increases, although guidance such as that issued by the US Department of Defense may allow for specific circumstances "where an accommodation can be reached by mutual agreement of the contracting parties, perhaps to address acute impacts on small business and other suppliers".

=== Fixed Price Economic Price Adjustment Contract (FPEPA) ===
According to the PMBOK (7th edition) by the Project Management Institute (PMI), Fixed Price Economic Price Adjustment Contract (FPEPA) is a "fixed-price contract, but with a special provision allowing for predefined final adjustments to the contract price due to changed conditions, such as inflation changes, or cost increases (or decrease) for special commodities".

=== Fixed Price Incentive Fee Contract (FPIF) ===
According to the PMBOK (7th edition) by the Project Management Institute (PMI), Fixed Price Incentive Fee Contract (FPIF) is a "type of contract where the buyer pays the seller a set amount (as defined by the contract), and the seller can earn an additional amount if the seller meets the defined performance criteria".

== Usage ==
US government procurement policy strongly favours use of fixed-price contracts, although Federal Acquisition Regulations do outline when they are "suitable" and the necessary basis on which "fair and reasonable prices" can be determined. They are suitable, in particular, for the supply of products available commercially.

Fixed-price contracts are often used by military and government contractors to require vendors to incur the risk of cost overruns, and to control costs. However, historically when such contracts are used for innovative new projects with untested or undeveloped technologies (such as new military transports or stealth attack airplanes), it often results in failure if costs greatly exceed the ability of the contractor to absorb unexpected cost overruns.

== Examples ==
=== Aerospace manufacturing ===
==== A400M transport aircraft ====
Airbus's German chief executive Tom Enders indicated that the fixed-price contract for the A400M transport aircraft was a disaster based on naivety, excessive enthusiasm and arrogance, stating, "If you had offered it to an American defence contractor like Northrop, they would have run a mile from it". He stated that unless the contract was renegotiated, the project must be abandoned.

==== A-12 Avenger II ====
The U.S. A-12 Avenger II aircraft development contract was a fixed-price incentive contract, not a fixed-price contract, with a target price of $4.38 billion and ceiling price of $4.84 billion. It was for a unique, stealthy, flying wing design. On 7 January 1991, the Secretary of Defense canceled the program. It was the largest contract termination in United States Department of Defense history. Rather than saving costs, the new type of aircraft was projected to consume 70 percent of the U.S. Navy's aircraft budget within three years.

==== KC-46 Pegasus ====
The U.S. Boeing KC-46 Pegasus contract was a fixed price contract. Due to its history of cost overruns, it is an example of how fixed price contracts place the risk upon the vendor, in this case Boeing. Total cost overruns for this aircraft have totaled about $1.9 billion. However, Boeing was able to absorb those costs and has gained US Air Force approval to begin producing the KC-46.

=== Construction ===
The Canadian Construction Documents Committee's "Stipulated Price Contract" (CCDC-2), revised in February 2008, provides for a property owner and prime contractor to agree that work is done for a fixed price or lump sum.

=== Real estate ===
In real estate and insurance, a binder is a temporary contract that fixes the price, subject to the final payment and sale at the closing.
