= Drag cost =

Project management metric

Drag cost is a project management metric developed by Stephen Devaux as part of the Total Project Control (TPC) approach to project schedule and cost analysis. It is the amount by which a project's expected return on investment (ROI) is reduced due to the critical path drag of a specific critical path activity Task (project management) or other specific schedule factor such as a schedule lag or other delaying constraint.

Drag cost is computed at the activity level, but is caused by the impact at the project level due to:

1. A reduction in a project's expected value because of later completion, or 2. An increase in a project's cost due to its indirect costs being increased because of a longer project duration.

Drag cost computation is often used on projects in order to justify additional project resources. For example, if a project's expected ROI will be reduced by $5,000 for every day of duration, then an activity that has critical path drag of ten days (i.e., is delaying project completion by ten days) will have a drag cost of $50,000. If the addition of a resource that costs $10,000 would reduce the activity's drag to five days, the drag cost would be reduced by $25,000 and the project's expected ROI would be increased by $15,000 ($25,000 minus the additional $10,000 of resource costs).

On projects which are performed for non-monetary reasons, such as public literacy programs or emergency response, drag cost can be measured in units of reduction in citizens educated or lives lost due to the additional time taken by critical path activities. Just as drag is only found on the critical path, the same is true of drag cost.

The concept of drag cost was first published in the Project Management Institute's Eighth Edition of the PMBOK Guide in 2026 as "critical path drag cost".
