= Project Management Institute =

U.S.-based not-for-profit professional organization

Project Management Institute, Inc.
- Formation: 1969
- Type: Nonprofit Professional organization
- Location: Newtown Square, Pennsylvania, United States
- Coordinates: 39°58′40″N 75°25′08″W
- Region served: Worldwide
- Services: Certification, Industry standards, Conferences, Publications
- Members: 746,689 (2025)
- Key people: Pierre Le Manh, President and CEO
- Revenue: ▲$343.21 million (2021)
- Expenses: ▲$278.55 million (2021)
- Staff: 721 (2022 Q2)
- Volunteers: 14,359 (2025)
- Website: pmi.org

The Project Management Institute (PMI, legally Project Management Institute, Inc.) is a not-for-profit professional organization established in 1969 in Pennsylvania, United States. It was founded with the aim to standardise project management practices internationally. PMI is headquartered in Newtown Square, Pennsylvania and operates in the United States as a 501(c)(6) organization.

As of 2025, PMI has more than five million professionals including over 746,689 members in 217 countries and territories, with 303 chapters and 14,359 volunteers in over 180 countries.

Its services include the development of standards, research, education, publication, networking opportunities in local chapters, hosting conferences and training seminars, and providing accreditation in project management.

== History ==
In the 1960s, project management as such began to be used in the US aerospace, construction, and defense industries. The Project Management Institute was founded by Ned Engman (McDonnell Douglas Automation), James Snyder, Susan Gallagher (SmithKline & French Laboratories), Eric Jenett (Brown & Root), and J Gordon Davis (Georgia Institute of Technology) at the Georgia Institute of Technology in 1969 as a nonprofit organization. It was incorporated in the state of Pennsylvania in the same year. PMI described its objectives in 1975 as to "foster recognition of the need for professionalism in project management; provide a forum for the free exchange of project management problems, solutions, and applications; coordinate industrial and academic research efforts; develop common terminology and techniques to improve communications; provide an interface between users and suppliers of hardware and software systems; and to provide guidelines for instruction and career development in the field of project management."

In the 1970s, standardization efforts represented 10 to 15 percent of the institute's efforts. The functions were performed through the Professional Liaison Committee which called on and coordinated with the Technology, Research Policy, and Education Committees. The institute participated in national activities through the American National Standards Committee XK 36.3 and internationally, through liaison with an appointed observer to Europe's International Project Management Association, then called INTERNET. PMI did not deal with the US federal government directly; several members were federal employees in agencies involved with project management.

In the 1980s, efforts were made to standardize project management procedures and approaches. The PMI produced the first Project Management Body of Knowledge (PMBOK) in 1996.

In the late 1990s, Virgil R. Carter became president of the PMI. In 2002, Carter was succeeded by Gregory Balestrero, who directed the institute until his retirement in January 2011. He was succeeded as president and CEO by Mark A. Langley. From March 2019 through December 2021, the president and CEO was Sunil Prashara. Pierre Le Manh was appointed CEO on September 1, 2022.

PMI has recruited volunteers to create industry standards, such as "Project Management Body of Knowledge", which has been recognized by the American National Standards Institute (ANSI). In 2012, ISO adapted the project management processes from the PMBOK Guide 4th edition.

== Certifications ==
In 1984, PMI held its first Project Management Professional (PMP) certification exam. As of May 2020, over one million people held the PMP credential. During the 2000s, PMI expanded its certification services to include the Program Management Professional (PgMP) and Agile Certified Practitioner (PMI-ACP). PMI offers a range of certifications in project, program, portfolio, risk, business analysis, scheduling, construction project management, including the Certified Associate in Project Management (CAPM).

To initially obtain a PMI credential, candidates must first document that they have met the required education and experience requirements. They must then pass an examination consisting of multiple-choice questions. To maintain most PMI credentials, holders must earn Professional Development Units (PDUs), which can be earned in a variety of ways such as taking classes, attending PMI global congresses, contributing to professional research, or writing and publishing papers on the subject. Most credentials must be renewed every three years.

PMI also provided a Certified OPM3 Professional credential which was officially discontinued on March 1, 2017. PMI no longer allows the use of the credential's designation by individuals who formerly obtained it. OPM3, even though no longer neither a credential nor a publication, remains a registered mark of PMI.

== Standards ==
The standards PMI develops and publishes fall into three main categories:

- Foundational Standards. These standards provide a foundation for project management knowledge and represent the four areas of the profession: project, program, portfolio, and the organizational approach to project management. They are the foundation on which practice standards and industry-specific extensions are built. According to PMI, standards are developed by volunteers in an open, consensus-based process including a public exposure draft process that allows the standard draft to be viewed and changes suggested.
- Practice Standards and Frameworks. Practice standards describe the use of a tool, technique, or process identified in the PMBOK® Guide or other foundational standards.
- Practice Guides. Practice guides provide supporting information and instruction to help one apply PMI's standards. Practice guides may become potential standards and if so, would undergo the process for the development of full consensus standards.

Here is a list of the current standards or guides in each category:

Foundational Standards

- A Guide to the Project Management Body of Knowledge (PMBOK Guide) – Seventh Edition (2021). Recognized by the American National Standards Institute (ANSI) as American National Standard ANSI/PMI 99-001-2021.
- The Standard for Program Management—Fourth Edition (2017). Recognized by ANSI as American National Standard ANSI/PMI 08-002-2017.
- The Standard for Portfolio Management—Fourth Edition (2017). Recognized by ANSI as American National Standard ANSI/PMI 08-003-2017.
- The Standard for Earned Value Management (2019). Recognized by ANSI as American National Standard ANSI/PMI 19-006-2019.
- The Standard for Risk Management in Portfolios, Programs, and Projects (2019).
- The Standard for Organizational Project Management (2018).
- The PMI Guide to Business Analysis (2017), which includes The Standard for Business Analysis.

Practice Standards and Frameworks

- Practice Standard for Project Estimating—Second Edition (2019).
- Practice Standard for Scheduling—Third Edition (2019).
- Practice Standard for Work Breakdown Structures—Third Edition (2019).
- Practice Standard for Project Configuration Management (2007).
- Project Manager Competency Development Framework—Third Edition (2017).

Practice Guides

- Benefits Realization Management: A Practice Guide (2019).
- Agile Practice Guide (2017).
- Requirements Management: A Practice Guide (2016).
- Governance of Portfolios, Programs, and Projects: A Practice Guide (2016).
- Business Analysis for Practitioners: A Practice Guide (2015).
- Navigating Complexity: A Practice Guide (2014).
- Managing Change in Organizations: A Practice Guide (2013).

PMI Lexicon of Project Management Terms

While not a standard, framework, or practice guide, the PMI Lexicon of Project Management Terms offers clear and concise definitions for nearly 200 of the profession's frequently used terms. Definitions in the Lexicon were developed by volunteer experts, and PMI standards committees are chartered to use the Lexicon terms without modification. Version 3.2 contains numerous revised terms based on requests from the 2017 foundational standard committees.

== PMI Global Summit ==
PMI's flagship annual conference, PMI Global Summit, is held in a different North American city each year and has previously been known as the PMI Global Congress and Global Conference. The institute traces the event's origins to a 1969 seminar on project management hosted at the Georgia Institute of Technology in Atlanta, attended by approximately 80 participants from the United States and Canada; in 2020, PMI replaced the in-person event with a virtual events series during the COVID-19 pandemic.

The 2022 summit in Las Vegas drew approximately 3,500 with sessions on strategy, agility, and organizational transformation. Recent editions have also been held in Atlanta (2023), Los Angeles (2024), Phoenix (2025), and Detroit (2026). Keynote speakers at past summits have included Tim Berners-Lee, Malala Yousafzai, and José Andrés. Other editions include Global Summit Series Europe, first held in 2024, and a Global Summit Series Africa, launched in Kigali, Rwanda, in 2025 as a successor to the PMI Africa Conference, along with PMXPO, an annual virtual event.

== Awards ==
PMI honors project management excellence in various categories, like project professionals, organizations, scholars, authors, and continuing professional education providers.

== See also ==
- List of international professional associations
