= Camelot Group =

Former operator of the UK National Lottery

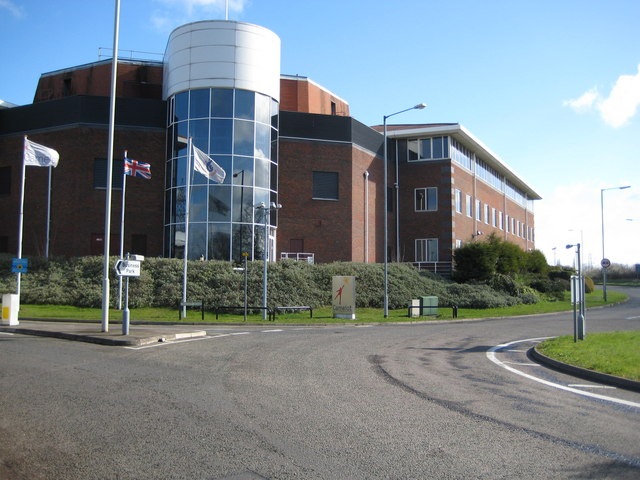
- Camelot Head Office in Watford
- Type: Private
- Industry: Lottery
- Founded: 1994; 32 years ago
- Defunct: 2024
- Fate: Acquired by Allwyn Entertainment, Ltd (replacement operator of the National Lottery)
- Headquarters: Watford, England, UK
- Area served: United Kingdom, Illinois
- Key people: Sir Keith Mills (chairman); Clare Swindell & Neil Brocklehurst (joint MD)
- Products: National Lottery (Note: The National Lottery brand is owned by the Gambling Commission and was licensed to Camelot as part of the franchise agreements under which Camelot operated The National Lottery.); Illinois State Lottery (Note: The Illinois State Lottery, marketed as the Illinois Lottery, is a brand owned by the State of Illinois and marketed by Camelot on its behalf.)
- Revenue: ▲£5.5 Billion GBP
- Operating income: ▲£47.2 Million GBP
- Net income: ▲£32.4 Million GBP
- Number of employees: 1000
- Parent: Allwyn Entertainment, Ltd
- Website: www.camelotgroup.co.uk

Camelot Group was an operator of lotteries, particularly the UK National Lottery from 1994 to 2024.

It has also operated the Illinois State Lottery in the state of Illinois in the United States since 2018. The Camelot Group companies, of which Camelot UK Lotteries Limited is the UK National Lottery operating subsidiary, are owned by the holding company Premier Lotteries Investments UK Limited. The group's ultimate parent was the Ontario Teachers' Pension Plan, a Canadian investment fund until 2023 when Allwyn AG purchased Camelot.

== History ==
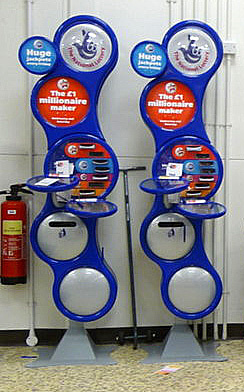
Ticket stands for the UK National Lottery, operated by Camelot from 1994 to 2024

=== UK development ===
Camelot was formed as a consortium to bid for the National Lottery project. The major partners were International Computers Limited (ICL), supplying hardware, software, and systems integration expertise; Racal with responsibility for the communications network; and Cadbury Schweppes bringing experience in consumer marketing and knowledge of the world of corner-shop retailers. De La Rue brought knowledge of secure printing technology, and GTECH Corporation were brought in as the selected supplier of applications software. Staff were seconded from the partner companies, transferring to Camelot Group when the bid was won.

Senior executives such as Tim Holley were enticed to join the project by the promise of large bonuses if the bid was successful. This caused embarrassment later when the incoming Labour government, in particular Chris Smith, the Culture Secretary, publicly criticised Camelot and its executives for excessively lavish salaries and bonus payments.

The Camelot Group was awarded the National Lottery franchise in May 1994. It won the bid against Sir Richard Branson who proposed to create a not-for-profit structure, an idea that didn't seduce the Gambling Commission.

The Camelot name is reflected in the actual lottery machines used in the National Lottery draw, which are named for characters, places, and objects in Arthurian Legend (Guinevere, Lancelot, Excalibur, Arthur, etc.).

In 2004, the transnational lottery EuroMillions entered the UK lottery market.

Camelot's third licence period started on 31 January 2009; the money given to good causes was increased, and retailers' commission increased from 5% to 6%. The third licence was for a ten-year period with the option to extend by a further five years. In March 2009, Camelot announced a programme of redundancies to cut costs throughout the company.

In March 2012, the National Lottery Commission extended Camelot's Licence by four years to 2023, on condition that Camelot deliver an additional £1.7 billion in lottery funding to good causes.

In October 2013, Camelot doubled the ticket price of its main National Lottery game, Lotto, to £2, with the aim of increasing ticket sales. Analysts noted that in the subsequent two-year period, funds raised for good causes by the National Lottery fell by £100 million.

In November 2017, Nigel Railton was named CEO of the Camelot group in amidst falling lottery ticket sales. He was previously the company's finance director, and had served as interim CEO since the departure of Andy Duncan in April 2017.

The Watford headquarters was previously the site of a Scammell Lorries Limited factory.

=== International development ===
In March 2010, Ontario Teachers' Pension Plan from Canada bought Camelot for £389 million.

In October 2013, Premier Lotteries Ireland, a consortium including the Camelot Group with An Post, won the licence to run Ireland's lottery for 20 years until 2034.

In January 2018, the Camelot group became the new operator of the Illinois State Lottery in the United States. The state of Illinois was the first in the US to privatize its lottery system.

=== Loss of licence ===
A franchise renewal competition was started in 2019 and Camelot group faced multiple competing bids to maintain the contract, including one from Northern & Shell (operator of The Health Lottery).

In March 2022 the Gambling commission announced that Camelot's National Lottery licence would not be renewed, and the franchise was awarded instead to Allwyn Entertainment Ltd, an international lottery operator owned by the Czech billionaire Karel Komárek. Camelot was held as the 'reserve applicant'.

In November 2022, it was announced Allwyn Entertainment Ltd. had acquired Camelot UK Lotteries Limited from the Ontario Teachers’ Pension Plan. The acquisition was completed in February 2023, after the deal was approved by the United Kingdom Gambling Commission. Although Allwyn did not disclose the exact value of the acquisition, it was estimated at 100 million pounds.

== Earnings ==
In 2017/18, the average pound (100p) spent on the National Lottery was distributed as follows:

- 55p Prize fund (50p in 2005)
- 24p Good causes (28p in 2005)
- 12p Government (12p in 2005)
- 4p Retailers (5p in 2005)
- 5p Camelot (5p in 2005)
  - 4.5p Camelot for operating costs
  - 0.5p Camelot for profit

According to the Camelot Group, the UK Lottery created 30 millionaires every month.

== Controversies ==
=== 2000/2001 franchise controversy ===
Two companies competed for the National Lottery franchise in 2001: Camelot, the incumbent operator, and a rival operator called "The People's Lottery", organised by Sir Richard Branson.

During the 2000 franchise bidding process, a technical problem with lottery terminals supplied by American company GTECH Corporation came to light. It was discovered that this technical problem may have inadvertently caused winners to be paid incorrect amounts. Because of this problem and the relationship between Camelot and GTECH, the National Lottery Commission recommended that the lottery franchise be awarded to the People's Lottery. GTECH had been a shareholder in Camelot Group but they sold their shareholding to the remaining shareholders, who increased their stakes from 16.66% to 20%.

In August 2000, the chair of the National Lottery Commission, Dame Helena Shovelton, announced that neither party would be invited to run the National Lottery, claiming that neither party met the statutory requirements to run the lottery. It was felt that legal problems were responsible for the downfall of the People's Lottery bid, while the relationship between G-Tech and Camelot was the reason Camelot would not be invited to run the lottery.

By September 2000, it was clear that although neither party met the statutory requirements to run the lottery, the commission was going to award the franchise to the People's Lottery. Camelot initiated legal action, taking the commission to the high court for a judicial review. The High Court judge sided with Camelot, describing the commission's decision as "conspicuously unfair to Camelot". The National Lottery Commission responded by dismissing the HM Treasury legal team who had been advising them. Dame Helena resigned shortly afterwards and was replaced by Lord Burns.

During November, the National Lottery Commission reopened the bidding process and both parties resubmitted their bids, the commission hoped to announce the winner by mid-December. On 19 December 2000 the commission announced that Camelot would be awarded the franchise, with voting 4–1 in favor of Camelot. One member later resigned from the commission over the process, deeply unhappy that Camelot had been re-awarded the franchise. Sir Richard Branson threatened to take further legal action; but due to the prospect of a lengthy and costly legal battle, one which could have resulted in the National Lottery games being suspended, he did not proceed with the action.

The governmental body the Gambling Commission is responsible for deciding who is awarded the franchise. The way the franchise was awarded to Camelot in 2001 caused some controversy, because state-owned Royal Mail held a 20% stake in the Camelot Group.

=== 2009 ticket fraud ===
In 2009 Giles Knibbs, a Camelot employee, conspired with a member of the public, Edward Putman, to claim a jackpot prize using a bogus ticket. Knibbs, who worked in Camelot's fraud department, found a way to forge lottery tickets bearing unclaimed winning numbers. Putman, of Kings Langley in Hertfordshire, was initially prosecuted in July 2012 for benefit fraud after failing to declare lottery winnings of £5 million whilst in receipt of welfare benefits.

Putman refused to give Knibbs £1m they had agreed, and had him arrested after a row over their agreement. Putman charged him with criminal damage, burglary and blackmail. In October 2015 Knibbs took his own life, fearful of repercussions over his actions.

Although police did not have enough evidence to bring a prosecution against Putman at the time, the case was investigated by the Gambling Commission in December 2016, who found that Camelot had breached the terms of its operating licence in failing to investigate the veracity of the prize claim before paying out and fined Camelot £3 million. The case was subsequently investigated further and in October 2019 Putman was jailed for 9 years for defrauding the National Lottery of £2.5 million.

=== 2018 failings fine ===
In August 2018, the Camelot Group was fined £1.15 million by the Gambling Commission because of the malfunctioning mobile app launched by the group, and for failing to publish a complete raffle prize list. Among other things, the mobile app would apply a non-winning label on a user's winning numbers. The Commission fined Camelot for five major failings, and observed 10 other failings that did not lead to further penalties. The Camelot Group accepted the fine and said it was sorry.

=== 2022 failings fine ===
In March 2022, the gambling commission announced a £3.15 million fine onto Camelot UK limited due to multiple failures on its mobile app. The failures included informing 20,000 players that their winning draw ticket had not won, charging players twice when only purchasing one ticket, and sending out marketing messages to 65,500 self-excluded customers who were not permitted to make purchases on the app.
