= MPP (file format) =

Microsoft Project file format

- Filename extensions: .mpp
- Internet media type: application/vnd.ms-project, application/msproj, application/x-msproject, application/x-ms-project, application/x-dos_ms_project, application/mpp, zz-application/zz-winassoc-mpp
- Developed by: Microsoft

MPP is a file format associated with Microsoft Project and is developed by the Microsoft Corporation. Microsoft Project is project management software for organizing, tracking, and maintaining project plans, used by project managers, stakeholders and people in the project team. It is designed for people, teams, and organizations of all sizes to provide project management resources and tools, as well as connected platforms for collaboration.

Microsoft Project is often used in conjunction with Microsoft Project Server to unify project management by providing web-based collaboration tools for reporting, business cases and extended interoperability.

== File format ==
In Microsoft Project 2019, local project files are saved as .mpp files by default. An .mpp file may be updated by different members of the project team. In order to keep the file information secure to unauthorized use, MS Project allows project managers to specify access rights for different project groups, and protect or block access to sensitive data on a particular project.

== Accessing ==
File in .mpp format can be opened either with Microsoft Project or specific software solutions designed to open and read native mpp files. Some of the applications for reading mpp files are Steelray Project Viewer, Free Online Microsoft Project Viewer from GanttPRO, Housatonic, Seavus Project Viewer, and Moos.

If the project file(s) is shared across a network, project members need to have updated version of Microsoft Project in order to ensure maximum compatibility. If a .mpp file was created with a newer version of MS Project, users with older versions of the software might not be able to fully read the .mpp file.
