= Seavus =

Swedish software development company, predecessor to Qinshift

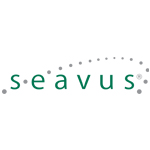
- Industry: Software development and Consulting
- Founded: 1999
- Defunct: 2023
- Successor: Qinshift (IT services division); Synami (software products division)
- Headquarters: Lund, Sweden
- Key people: Igor Lestar (Chairman of the Management Board); Kocha Boshku (CEO)
- Number of employees: 800
- Parent: ARICOMA Group (KKCG)
- Website: www.seavus.com

Seavus was an international software development and consulting company based in Lund, Sweden. Seavus Group provided products to large organizations and government agencies. In 2023, following its acquisition by ARICOMA Group, the company was merged into Qinshift, a new IT brand consolidating several European technology companies.

== History ==
Seavus was founded by Igor Lestar, Richard Murbeck and Gligor Dacevski in 1999 in Malmö.

In 2003, the company released the first version of Seavus Project Viewer.

In 2004, Seavus opened its first office in the United States in an effort to expand beyond Europe and enter the markets in North and South America.

In 2009, the company released the first versions of Seavus Project Planner and Seavus DropMind; DropMind was later rebranded as iMindQ in 2014.

In 2012, Seavus introduced Crystal Qube at the Mobile World Congress in Barcelona, Spain. In the same year, BestAppEver ranked Seavus' iOS games Yatzy Ultimate and Black Jack Ultimate third place for the best dice game and the best casino game, respectively.

In 2013, the company's gaming platform solution Seavus Guardians was presented at the 12th European iGaming Congress & Expo (EiG) 2013 in Barcelona.

In 2015, Seavus continued its growth on the Scandinavian market through the acquisition of OnTrax AB, a Stockholm-based IT consultancy. In January 2017, OnTrax AB became Seavus Stockholm AB.

In 2016, the Seavus Incubator launched iThink, an accelerator for startup companies. The first version of ScheduleReader was also launched in 2016.

In 2017, Seavus DOOEL was certified as a Cisco Select Certified Partner in Europe East.

In 2020, Seavus was acquired by ARICOMA Group, part of the KKCG holding group.

In 2021, Seavus became partners with Salesforce.

In June 2023, Seavus, Cleverlance, Komix Digital, Stratiteq, Clearcode, and Musala Soft merged to create Qinshift, a new entity with approximately 3,000 IT specialists. Simultaneously, the Seavus Education and Development Center (SEDC) was rebranded as Qinshift Academy.

=== Synami ===
Following the merger into Qinshift, the software products division of Seavus was separated and continued operating independently under the name Synami, a privately held company headquartered in St Venera, Malta, with operations in North Macedonia.

Synami took over maintenance and development of the legacy Seavus software products, including Seavus Project Viewer, ScheduleReader, iMindQ, and ScheduleCleaner. In 2023, the company released PPM Core, a cloud-based project portfolio management platform.

ScheduleReader, originally released by Seavus in 2016 under the name PrimaveraReader, was rebranded in October 2018 following the addition of support for schedule file formats beyond the native Oracle Primavera P6 .xer format.

== Operations ==
Seavus had 15 operating offices located in 8 countries — Sweden, the United States, North Macedonia, Belarus, Switzerland, Serbia, Bosnia and Herzegovina, and Moldova — with a stated continuous growth strategy.

Seavus served a multinational client base and held partnerships with Microsoft, Oracle, Cisco, IBM, Atlassian, and Salesforce.

== Products and services ==
Seavus delivered software solutions across telecommunications (BSS/OSS), customer relationship management, enterprise banking and financial software, DWH and business intelligence, application lifecycle management (ALM), and managed services.

Software products originating from Seavus include:

- Seavus Project Viewer — A viewer for Microsoft Project .mpp files, first released in 2003. Now maintained by Synami.
- ScheduleReader — A viewer for Oracle Primavera P6 schedule files, first released in 2016. Now maintained by Synami.
- iMindQ — A mind mapping application, originally released as DropMind in 2009 and rebranded in 2014. Now maintained by Synami.
