= Seavus Project Viewer =

Viewer for Microsoft Project files

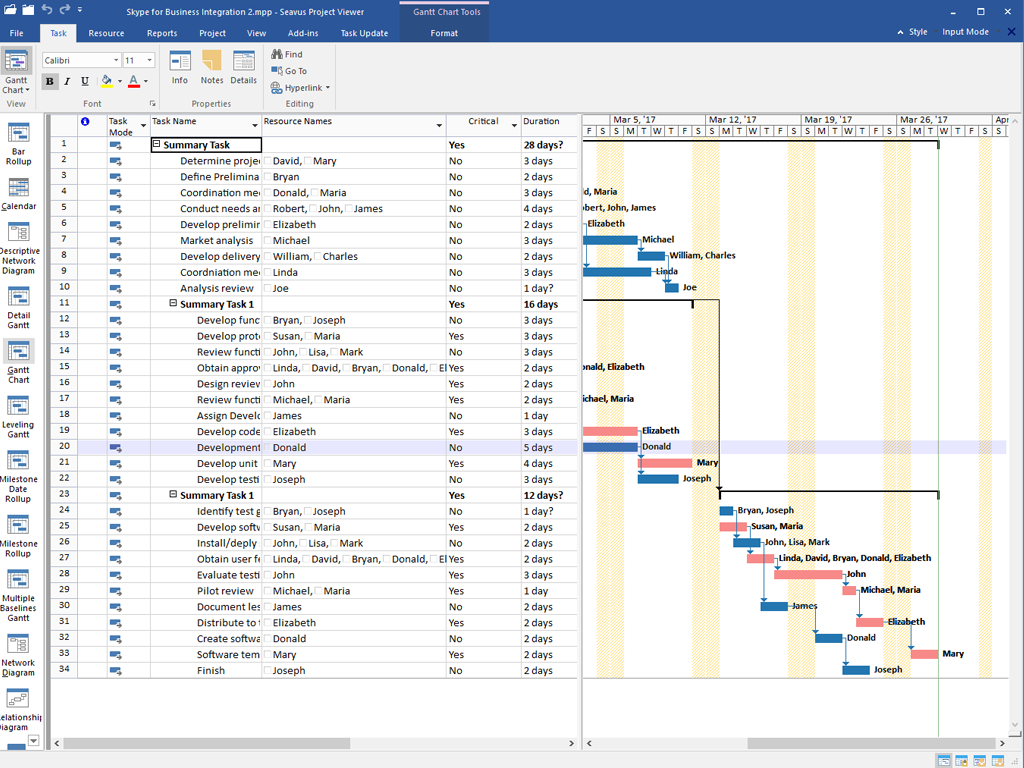
- Seavus Project Viewer 15 running on Windows 10
- Developer: Synami
- Stable release: v19 / 30 June 2022; 4 years ago
- Operating system: Microsoft Windows, macOS, Android, iOS (iPhone and iPad), Web application
- Size: 53.25 MB
- Available in: 11 languages
- List of languages English, German, French, Spanish, Czech, Japanese, Italian, Polish, Dutch, Russian, Chinese
- Type: project management
- License: Trialware
- Website: www.seavusprojectviewer.com

Seavus Project Viewer is a viewer for Microsoft Project files developed by Synami (originally created by Seavus). According to its developer, the software is used by two-thirds of Fortune 500 companies. It reads the native .mpp file format created in any Microsoft Project version. As a project management software, it is designed to assist users (team members, team leads, project stakeholders and other project participants) to review their project assignments, print the project information and follow the overall project status. The application software shows critical path schedules and critical chain which are visualized in a Gantt chart.

== Overview ==
When the project manager saves the project in an .mpp file, which is the native file format for Microsoft Project, the formatting information is stored along with the project information in the same file. Seavus Project Viewer reads this information when opening .mpp files, showing the same formatting and visual styles as in Microsoft Project.

The supported versions of the .mpp file format are Microsoft Project 2007, Microsoft Project 2010, Microsoft Project 2013, Microsoft Project 2016, Microsoft Project 2019, Microsoft Project 2021, and Microsoft Project 2024. Seavus Project Viewer is the first project viewer compatible with Windows 11.

Users can open Microsoft Project files hosted on the following cloud storages:

- Microsoft SharePoint
- Microsoft Project Server
- OneDrive
- Google Drive

Seavus Project Viewer is available for Microsoft Windows, macOS, via the web with an online version, on the mobile iOS, and Android platforms, with historical support for Windows Phone and the Apple Watch.

== Features ==
Seavus Project Viewer supports more than 27 standard views available in Microsoft Project, as well as user-defined views created by the project manager and saved within the .mpp file. It provides a collaborative environment for project teams without server installation. With the Task Update functionality, teams can introduce a collaborative project environment, while the project manager will have up-to-date information about the current status of project tasks and be able to track if all assignments in the project plan are finished on time.

Visual reports and dashboards allow team leads and project participants to view the health of the project plan. Users can view the status of the whole project, the work completion status, resources allocation status, and project and resources costs overview. The graphical reports can be customized according to the users' preference to monitor how a certain parameter changes throughout the lifespan of the project.

Seavus Project Viewer is fully integrated with most cloud storage providers, allowing users to open, view, and print Project Plans and Master Project Plans from a shared location, with every member having access to the updated Microsoft Project plan. The complete SharePoint integration enables users to manage all project plans directly from SharePoint hosted in-house, or to collaborate with team members using SharePoint Online included in Office 365, as well as OneDrive and Google Drive.

The software historically featured integration with the now-retired Skype for Business to create a central application for meetings.

== See also ==
- List of project management software
- Microsoft Project
- Synami
