= MPP =

MPP or M.P.P. may refer to:

- Marginal physical product
- Master of Public Policy, an academic degree
- Member of Provincial Parliament (Ontario), Canada
- Member of Provincial Parliament (Western Cape), South Africa
- Merriweather Post Pavilion, an album released in 2009 by Animal Collective
- Migrant Protection Protocols of the U.S. Citizenship and Immigration Service

== Groups and organizations ==
- Marijuana Policy Project, US
- Medicines Patent Pool, UN
- Mongolian People's Party
- Mouvement du Peuple pour le Progrès (People's Movement for Progress), Burkina Faso
- Movement for a People's Party, US
- Movement of Popular Participation, Uruguay

=== Companies ===
- Micro Precision Products, a British camera manufacturer

== Science and technology ==
- Maximum Power Point
- 1-Methyl-4-phenylpyridine (MPP^{+}), a toxic molecule
- Methylpiperidinopyrazole, a highly selective antagonist of ERα
- Micro perforated plate, as a sound absorber
- Molypermalloy powder core, a magnetic core in electronics
- Multipotent progenitor of hematopoietic stem cells
- Magnetic Power Profile (MPP)

=== Computation ===
- Massive parallel processing
  - Goodyear MPP or Goodyear Massively Parallel Processor
- MPP (file format), of Microsoft Project Plan
- Microsoft pen protocol, used for digital stylus pens

== Other uses ==
- Metroid Prime Pinball, a Nintendo DS video game
- Honda Mobile Power Pack, a removable battery for personal transportation
- Marie-Philip Poulin, a Canadian ice hockey player
