= KKCG =

Czech investment company

- Type: Aktiengesellschaft
- Industry: Investment company
- Founded: 1992; 34 years ago Prague, Czech Republic
- Founder: Karel Komárek
- Headquarters: Lucerne, Switzerland
- Key people: Katarína Kohlmayer (CFO); Jiří Radoch (COO); Pavel Šaroch (CIO); Miroslav Jestřabík (Investment Director); Martin Škopek
- Products: Private equity, Investment
- Number of employees: 9,000 in invested companies (2022)
- Website: kkcg.com

KKCG is a Czech investment company headquartered in Lucerne that was founded in Prague by Czech entrepreneur Karel Komárek.

It holds investments in companies in 36 countries in four industry sectors: lottery and gaming, energy, information technology, and real estate. As of 2023, KKCG had invested in companies that had in total 9,000 employees worldwide and managed assets worth more than €9 billion.

== History ==
=== Energy ===
In 1992, Karel Komárek received a loan from his father, which allowed him to invest in M.O.S. Hodonín, a company which specialises in industrial fittings. One of his subsequent investments was into the energy company Moravské naftové doly (Moravian Oil Mines), based in his hometown, Hodonín.

In 2014, MND became active in the Czech energy market and began supplying natural gas to private customers. As of 2023, Moravské naftové doly is one of the largest energy corporations in the Czech Republic. It also operates in Slovakia, Germany, the Netherlands, Austria, France, Hungary, Ukraine, and Great Britain.

In 2016, KKCG began investing into the production of methanol in the United States. It established the company US Methanol LLC in Charleston, West Virginia in April 2016, marking its first major investment in the US. US Methanol owns and operates mid-sized methanol plants in Institute, West Virginia with an initial daily production of around 400-500 tonnes. The plant was commissioned in 2022.

=== Lottery and gambling ===
In 2011, KKCG first entered the lottery business by becoming the majority shareholder of the formerly state-owned Czech lottery firm Sazka a.s. One year later, KKCG took over the remaining shares of Sazka a.s., effectively becoming its owner.

In 2016, KKCG established a joint venture with fellow Czech company EMMA Capital, which retained the name Sazka Group. In the same year, Sazka Group acquired a 32.5% stake of the Italian lottery company Lottoitalia in the form of a joint venture, among others with the British company Lottomatica (IGT).

By 2018, Sazka Group was the largest lottery group in Europe with national lottery operations in Greece, Italy, and Austria. In 2019, KKCG took over EMMA Capital's 25% of shares of Sazka Group for € 630 million, effectively becoming the sole owner of Sazka Group. As a result, KKCG (and therefore then Sazka Group) acquired EMMA Capital's stakes in the Greek gambling company OPAP S.A. (33%), in Lottoitalia, and the Austrian lottery company Casinos Austria AG (CASAG; 38.29%). Since June 2020, Sazka Group has been the majority shareholder of CASAG, holding 55% of its shares. In 2021, it increased its amount of shares to 59,7 %. In 2022, Sazka Group increased its shares in OPAP to 49.84%.

Sazka Group a.s. completed its rebranding to Allwyn International a.s. in May 2022.

In March 2022, it was announced that Allwyn's British subsidiary Allwyn Entertainment, Ltd. had been selected as a preferred applicant for the 10-year licence by the Gambling Commission of the United Kingdom to begin operating the state-franchised National Lottery from February 2024 onward. Oliver Gill of The Daily Telegraph called the licence the "UK's biggest public sector contract" and expected the total revenue generated from ticket sales to be somewhere between GBP 80–100 billion. The National Lottery's previous operator, Camelot Group, who had held the rights from 1994, pursued legal action against the Gambling Commission's decision. They subsequently withdrew their decision to appeal. At the end of 2022, it was announced that Allywn had taken over Camelot Group from the Ontario Teachers' Pension Plan, thus becoming the operator of the National Lottery when the transaction was completed in February 2023. In early 2023, Allwyn also took over the Camelot Lottery Solutions Group, based in the United States, who is the operator of the Illinois State Lottery. This acquisition marked Allwyn's entrance into the United States lottery market.

Allwyn has stated intentions twice to become a public company. The first time was in the mid-2010s, when the company sought an IPO at the London Stock Exchange. However, the plans were stopped due to Brexit. In early 2022, Allwyn announced a merger with the special-purpose acquisition company Cohn Robbins Holdings, in order to be publicly listed at the New York Stock Exchange. The project was not implemented due to "continued and increasing market volatility", however Allwyn stated intentions to still enter the US stock market at a later point in time.

In February 2025, Allwyn signed partnership deals with Formula One and McLaren Racing (McLaren F1 Team, McLaren Shadow F1 Sim Racing Team, and McLaren F1 Academy).

=== Information technology ===
In 2014, KKCG initiated the investment fund Springtide Ventures, which supports IT-startups from Czechia and Israel, who are active in information security.

In 2017, KKCG purchased a majority stake (70%) in the Czech IT company AutoCont. In 2019, KKCG founded Aricoma Group, which is where the company's investments in the information technology sector (aside from the two startups) have been concentrated since then. In the same year, it was announced that Aricoma had purchased majority shares in the Czech software companies Cleverlance Enterprise Solutions (75%) and AEC (50%).

In 2020, Aricoma acquired Swedish software development company Seavus. In 2021 it took over Czech IT firm Komix and Swedish technology consultancy Stratiteq. In 2022, Aricoma acquired Polish IT company Clearcode as well as Bulgarian software engineering services firm Musala Soft.

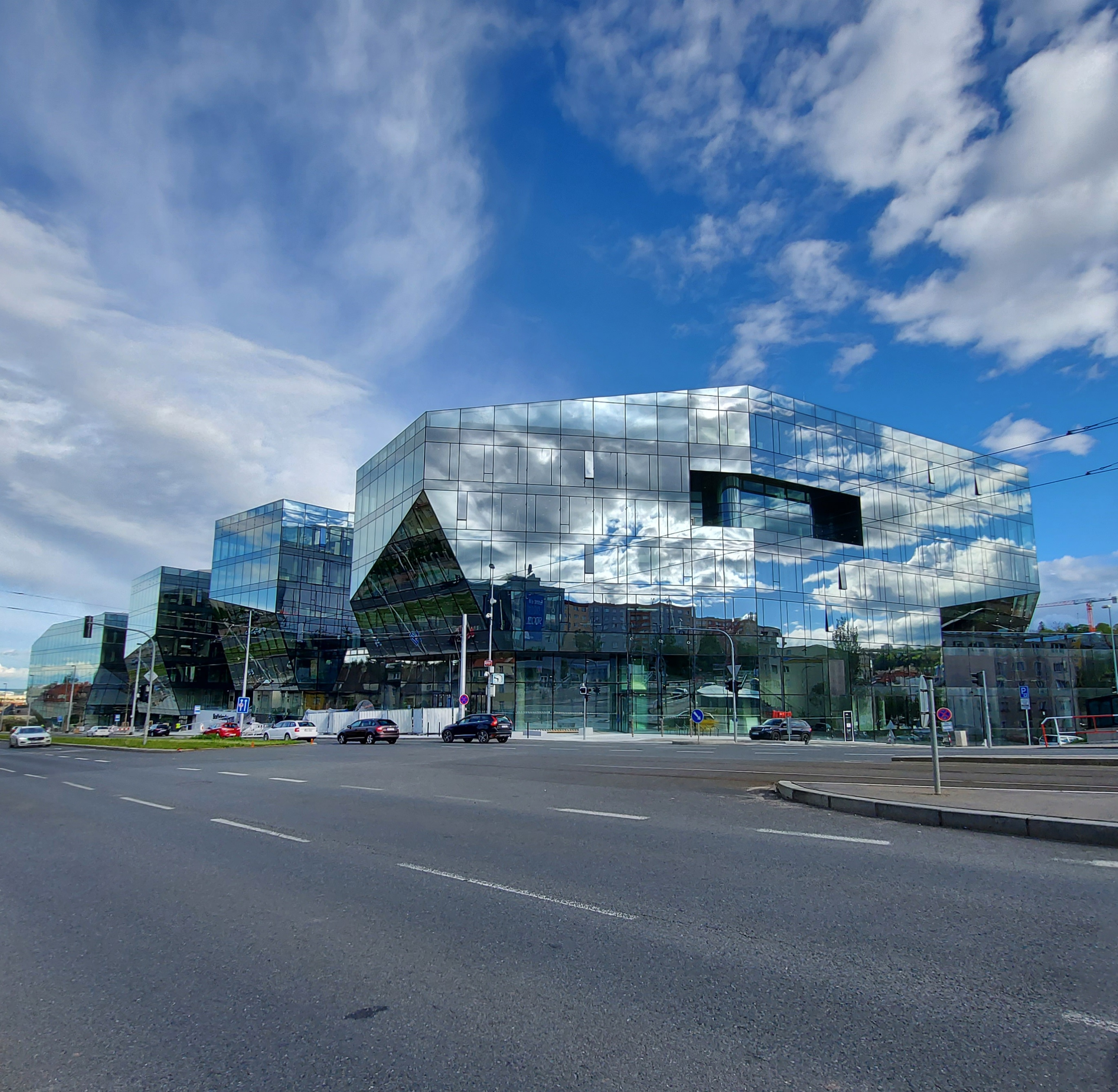
Bořislavka Centrum in Prague (2021)

In late June 2023, the Aricoma Group announced that it would operate under two major brands: Aricoma and Qinshift. All companies which focus on custom software development will operate under the Qinshift brand, whereas the rest of the group would rebrand to Aricoma.

=== Real estate ===
In 2012, KKCG entered the real estate market by founding the subsidiary KKCG Real Estate Group, headquartered in Prague. One of the most notable and so far the biggest project of the group is the Bořislavka Centrum in Prague, which it began constructing in 2018 and opened in 2021.
