= National Lottery (United Kingdom) =

State lottery in the United Kingdom

The National Lottery
- Region: United Kingdom; Isle of Man
- First draw: 19 November 1994
- Regulated by: Gambling Commission
- Highest jackpot: £209,300,000 (EuroMillions) £66,070,646 (Lotto)
- Odds of winning jackpot: 45,057,474 to 1 (Lotto); 139,838,160 to 1 (EuroMillions); 15,339,390 to 1 (Set For Life); 8,060,597 to 1 (Thunderball)
- Number of games: 7
- Shown on: BBC (1994–2017); ITV (2018–present)
- Website: www.national-lottery.co.uk

The National Lottery is the state-franchised national lottery established in 1994 in the United Kingdom. It is regulated by the Gambling Commission, and is operated by Allwyn Entertainment, who took over from Camelot Group (who had been running The National Lottery since its inception) on 1 February 2024.

Prizes are paid as a lump sum (with the exception of Set For Life and Powerball which are paid over a set period) and are tax-free. Of all money spent on National Lottery games, around 53% goes to the prize fund and 25% to "good causes" as set out by Parliament (though some of this is considered by some to be a form of "stealth tax" levied to support the National Lottery Community Fund, a fund constituted to support public spending). 12% goes to the UK government as lottery duty, 4% to retailers as commission, and a total of 5% to the operator, with 4% to cover operating costs and 1% as profit.

Since 22 April 2021, players must be 18 years of age to purchase lottery tickets and scratchcards (online and in-store). Previously, the minimum age was 16.

== History ==
=== Background ===
A statute of 1698 provided that in England lotteries were by default illegal unless specifically authorised by statute. State lotteries were established by the Bank of England to generate money for 'good causes' and also to enable Britain to go to war. Early English state lotteries included the Million Lottery (1694) and the Malt Lottery (1697).

The final lottery occurred on 18 October 1826 with a prize fund of almost £1.5 million; it was the 170th state lottery to be held since 1694.

A 1934 Act, further liberalised in 1956 and 1976, legalised small lotteries.

=== 20th century ===
A National Health Service Lottery was piloted in 1988 but cancelled for legal reasons before the first draw.

National Lottery etc. Act 1993 (Note: Section 66.)
- Act of Parliament
- Parliament of the United Kingdom
- Long title: An Act to authorise lotteries to be promoted as part of a National Lottery; to make provision with respect to the running and regulation of that National Lottery and with respect to the distribution of its net proceeds; to increase the membership and extend the powers of the Trustees of the National Heritage Memorial Fund; to amend section 1 of the Revenue Act 1898 and the Lotteries and Amusements Act 1976; to amend the law relating to pool betting; and for connected purposes.
- Citation: 1993 c. 39
- Introduced by: Peter Brooke MP, Secretary of State for National Heritage (Commons); Earl Ferrers, Minister of State, Home Office (Lords)
- Territorial extent: United Kingdom

Dates
- Royal assent: 21 October 1993
- Commencement: Various (Note: Section 65.)
Other legislation
Amends	Revenue Act 1898; Betting, Gaming and Lotteries Act 1963; Parliamentary Commissioner Act 1967; Gaming Act 1968; House of Commons Disqualification Act 1975; Northern Ireland Assembly Disqualification Act 1975; Lotteries and Amusements Act 1976; National Heritage Act 1980; Betting, Gaming, Lotteries and Amusements (Northern Ireland) Order 1985; Charities Act 1993
Amended by	National Lottery etc. Act 1993 (Amendment of Section 23) Order 1994; National Lottery etc. Act 1993 (Amendment of Section 23) Order 1995; National Lottery etc. Act 1993 (Amendment of Section 23) Order 1996; National Heritage Act 1997; National Lottery Act 1998; National Lottery etc. Act 1993 (Amendment of Section 23) Order 1999; National Lottery etc. Act 1993 (Amendment of Section 23) (No. 2) Order 1999; Scotland Act 1998 (Modification of Functions) Order 1999; Scotland Act 1998 (Transfer of Functions to the Scottish Ministers etc. ) Order 1999; National Lottery etc. Act 1993 (Amendment of Section 23) (Scotland) Order 2000; National Lottery (Funding of Endowments) Act 2003; Enterprise Act 2002 (Insolvency) Order 2003; Horserace Betting and Olympic Lottery Act 2004; Gambling Act 2005; National Lottery Act 2006; National Lottery etc. Act 1993 (Amendment of Section 23) Order 2006; National Lottery Act 2006 (Commencement No. 2 and Transitional Provisions) Order 2006; Transfer of Functions (Olympics and Paralympics) Order 2007; National Lottery etc. Act 1993 (Amendment of Section 23) Order 2007; Dormant Bank and Building Society Accounts Act 2008; Companies Act 2006 (Consequential Amendments, Transitional Provisions and Savings) Order 2009; Apportionment of Money in the National Lottery Distribution Fund Order 2010; National Lottery etc. Act 1993 (Amendment of Section 23) (Creative Scotland) Order 2010; Budget Responsibility and National Audit Act 2011; Transfer of Functions (Big Lottery Fund) Order 2011; National Lottery etc. Act 1993 (Big Lottery Fund) (Amendment of Schedule 4A) Order 2011; National Lottery etc. Act 1993 (Amendment of Section 23) Order 2011; Public Bodies (Abolition of the National Endowment for Science, Technology and the Arts) Order 2012; Public Bodies (Merger of the Gambling Commission and The National Lottery Commission) Order 2013; Transfer of Functions (Elections, Referendums, Third Sector and Information) Order 2016; Criminal Justice Act 2003 (Commencement No. 33) and Sentencing Act 2020 (Commencement No. 2) Regulations 2022; Judicial Review and Courts Act 2022 (Magistrates’ Court Sentencing Powers) Regulations 2023
Relates to	Rehabilitation of Offenders Act 1974; Rehabilitation of Offenders (Northern Ireland) Order 1978

Status: Amended

Text of statute as originally enacted

Revised text of statute as amended

The UK's state-franchised lottery was set up under government licence by the government of John Major in 1993 through the National Lottery etc. Act 1993. The National Lottery was franchised to a private operator; the Camelot Group was awarded the franchise on 25 May 1994. The proportion of the population spending 10% or more of their total income on gambling products increased from 0.4% to 1.7% after the introduction of the National Lottery.

The first draw took place on 19 November 1994 with a television programme presented by Noel Edmonds. The first numbers drawn were 30, 3, 5, 44, 14 and 22, the bonus was 10, and seven jackpot winners shared a prize of £5,874,778.

National Lottery Act 1998 (Note: Section 27(1).)
- Act of Parliament
- Parliament of the United Kingdom
- Long title: An Act to make further provision in relation to the National Lottery; to make provision for and in connection with the establishment of a body corporate to be endowed out of the National Lottery Distribution Fund and to be known as the National Endowment for Science, Technology and the Arts; and for connected purposes.
- Citation: 1998 c. 22
- Introduced by: Chris Smith MP, Secretary of State for Culture, Media and Sport (Commons); Lord McIntosh of Haringey (Lords)
- Territorial extent: United Kingdom (Note: Section 27(7).)

Dates
- Royal assent: 2 July 1998
- Commencement: Various (Note: Section 27(3)–(5).)
Other legislation
Amends	National Lottery etc. Act 1993
Amended by	National Lottery Act 2006; Public Bodies (Abolition of the National Endowment for Science, Technology and the Arts) Order 2012; Public Bodies (Merger of the Gambling Commission and The National Lottery Commission) Order 2013

Status: Amended

Text of statute as originally enacted

Revised text of statute as amended

The National Lottery Act 1998 was an act of the Parliament of the United Kingdom which was passed to reform the National Lottery. The 1998 act created the National Lottery Commission. The 1998 act established the New Opportunities Fund to provide funding for health, education and environment.

A second lottery draw, Thunderball, was introduced by Camelot on 12 June 1999, which took place during the first episode of Winning Lines. The first main numbers drawn on Thunderball were 32, 8, 26, 31 and 28, and the first Thunderball number drawn was 6.

=== 21st century ===
The National Lottery undertook a major rebranding programme in May 2002, designed to combat falling sales. The main game was renamed Lotto, and Lottery Extra became Lotto Extra; however Camelot retired Lotto Extra on 8 July 2006 due to low sales. The stylised crossed-fingers logo was modified. However, the games are still collectively known as The National Lottery. It is one of the most popular forms of gambling in the United Kingdom.

National Lottery (Funding of Endowments) Act 2003 (Note: Section 2(1).)
- Act of Parliament
- Parliament of the United Kingdom
- Long title: An Act to make provision about the funding of endowments from distributions of money out of the National Lottery Distribution Fund; and for connected purposes.
- Citation: 2003 c. 23
- Introduced by: Keith Simpson MP (Commons); Lord Walpole (Lords)
- Territorial extent: United Kingdom (Note: Section 2(2).)

Dates
- Royal assent: 18 September 2003
- Commencement: 18 September 2003 (Note: Section 4(b) of the Interpretation Act 1978.)
Other legislation
Amends	National Lottery etc. Act 1993
Amended by	National Lottery Act 2006

Status: Amended

Text of statute as originally enacted

Revised text of statute as amended

The National Lottery (Funding of Endowments) Act 2003 was an act of Parliament which empowered the National Lottery to establish endowment funds. The definition of endowment funds includes permanent endowments. It was passed as a private member's bill.

National Lottery Act 2006 (Note: Section 24.)
- Act of Parliament
- Parliament of the United Kingdom
- Long title: An Act to make provision about The National Lottery.
- Citation: 2006 c. 23
- Introduced by: Tessa Jowell MP, Secretary of State for Culture, Media and Sport (Commons); Baron Davies of Oldham (Lords)
- Territorial extent: United Kingdom (Note: Section 23.)

Dates
- Royal assent: 11 July 2006
- Commencement: Various (Note: Section 22.)
Other legislation
Amends	Public Records Act 1958; Parliamentary Commissioner Act 1967; Superannuation Act 1972; House of Commons Disqualification Act 1975; Northern Ireland Assembly Disqualification Act 1975; Race Relations Act 1976; Police Act 1997; National Lottery Act 1998; Government of Wales Act 1998; Charities Act 1993; National Lottery etc. Act 1993; Freedom of Information Act 2000; National Lottery (Funding of Endowments) Act 2003; Horserace Betting and Olympic Lottery Act 2004
Amended by	Public Bodies (Merger of the Gambling Commission and The National Lottery Commission) Order 2013

Status: Amended

History of passage through Parliament

Text of statute as originally enacted

Revised text of statute as amended

The National Lottery Act 2006 was another act of Parliament. It established the Big Lottery Fund, which replaced three existing distributing bodies: the Community Fund, the New Opportunity Fund and the Millennium Commission. The act allowed distributors to consult and take account of public opinion when deciding on distributions, and required that the returns for good causes are maximised.

Originally, the draw machines for Lotto and Lotto Extra were the Criterion model, manufactured by Beitel Lottery Products, which was acquired by Smartplay International Inc. in 1997, but on 25 October 2003, Camelot replaced them with Smartplay's Magnum I model. These machines were called Topaz, Sapphire, Amethyst, Opal, Garnet and Moonstone, while the older Criterion machines from 1994 were called Merlin, Arthur, Lancelot and Guinevere, with the addition of Vyvyan and Galahad in 2000.

On 21 November 2009, Camelot replaced its older Lotto draw machines again. The new machines have the same names as the earlier machines, except for Vyvyan and Galahad. On 9 May 2010, new machines for the Thunderball game were introduced, replacing Smartplay's older Halogen I model that had been in use since 1999, following the major rule changes on Thunderball. The current Lotto machines are the Smartplay Magnum II model, and the current Thunderball and Set For Life machines are the Smartplay Halogen II model. The Thunderball and Set for Life machines are all named Excalibur, after King Arthur's sword. One of The National Lottery's original Beitel Criterion Lottery machines, Guinevere, is currently on display at the Science Museum, London after being donated by Camelot in 2022.

On 16 March 2018, Camelot advised more than 10 million players with online accounts to change their passwords because of a "low-level" cyber attack that affected 150 customer accounts. They claimed that no money was taken from customers. Camelot claimed the hackers used a method called credential stuffing and said the attack appeared to have begun on 7 March.

In February 2024, Allwyn Entertainment Ltd (part of the multinational KKCG company) took over all operations of The National Lottery, replacing the Camelot Group. In March 2026, Allwyn reported that in its 2025 financial report that commissions from The National Lottery had declined 4% year-on-year, falling to €590m.

== Eligibility ==
As of 22 April 2021, the eligibility requirements include:

- Players must be at least 18 years old to buy scratchcards or to play Lotto, Thunderball, EuroMillions or Set For Life.
- Tickets may be bought in person at approved premises in the UK, or online.
- Online purchase of tickets from The National Lottery website is restricted to people who have a UK bank account (for debit card or direct debit purposes), are resident in the UK or Isle of Man, and are physically present in the UK or Isle of Man when making the ticket purchase.
- The ticket purchaser for a syndicate, typically its manager, must meet the eligibility criteria for ticket purchase. Syndicate members must be aged 18 or over.
- Lottery tickets are not transferable, so commercial syndicates (i.e. where extra charges are levied over and above the total face value of the tickets purchased) are not permitted.

From introduction in November 1994 until April 2021, lottery tickets could be purchased by people at least 16 years old. Scratchcards, from introduction in March 1995 to April 2021, could also be purchased by people at least 16 years old.

=== Isle of Man ===
The National Lottery Act 1999 is an act of Tynwald which extended the National Lottery to the Isle of Man. Tickets became available on the Isle of Man in February 2000.

== Games ==
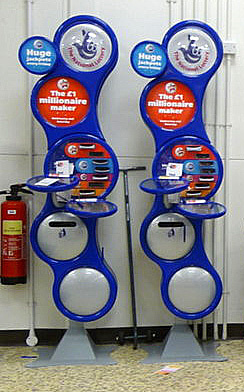
Two lottery ticket stands in a supermarket, 2009

Several games operate under The National Lottery brand:

=== Current games ===
As of July 2026, the current games include:

==== Lotto ====
Players buy tickets with their choice of six different numbers between 1 and 59; there is provision for random numbers to be generated automatically for those who do not wish to choose, known as a 'Lucky Dip'. The Lucky Dip option was first introduced on 17 March 1996. The entry fee to the Lotto draw was set at £1 per board from its introduction, and increased to £2 in October 2013.

The draw is conducted twice a week on Wednesdays and Saturdays, except that, between 1994 and 2009, a draw on Christmas Day was moved to Christmas Eve; since 2010, draws are held on Christmas Day if that is a Wednesday or Saturday. Saturday draws started on 19 November 1994, under the name 'National Lottery'; the first Wednesday draw was on 5 February 1997. All of the draws are shown live on their YouTube channel at 20:00 on Wednesdays, and Saturdays.

Lotto was originally called The National Lottery, but was renamed Lotto in an update on 18 May 2002 after ticket sales decreased. Lotto is by far the most popular draw, with around 15 to 45 million tickets sold each draw. The most winners for a single jackpot was 133 in January 1995, each player winning £122,510.

In the draw, six numbered balls are drawn without replacement from a set of 59 balls numbered from 1 to 59 (formerly 1 to 49 until October 2015). A further Bonus Ball is also drawn, which affects only players who match five numbers.

There are six prize tiers, which are awarded to players who match at least two of the six drawn numbers, with prizes increasing for matching more of the drawn numbers. The players who match all six drawn numbers win equal shares of the jackpot; the chance of doing so is 1 in 45,057,474. Similarly, if four or five balls are matched, the relevant prize is divided equally between all who match that many balls.

If no player matches all six numbers, the jackpot is added to that of the next Lotto draw—a rollover. This accumulation was limited to three consecutive draws until 10 February 2011, when it was increased to four. Rollovers are frequent, with for example 20 Wednesday (39%) and 13 Saturday rollovers (25%) in 2011 (fewer tickets are sold on Wednesdays than Saturdays, increasing the probability of a rollover). "Treble rollovers"—two consecutive rollovers—are much less common. The first quadruple rollover draw occurred on Saturday 29 September 2012 with a jackpot of £19.5 million. In the event of a quadruple rollover, if no tickets matched all six main numbers, the jackpot was shared between the tickets that match five numbers and the bonus ball. In October 2015, this rollover limit was replaced by a jackpot cap.

==== Lotto Bonus Draws ====
On 18 May 2002, to celebrate the rebranding of The National Lottery, Camelot had introduced three special one-off bonus jackpot-only draws, with each bonus draw having a jackpot of £4,000,000. In the same year on 1 June 2002, Camelot had introduced another special one-off jackpot-only draw to celebrate the Golden Jubilee of Queen Elizabeth II. Whilst the estimated jackpot for the main Lotto draw that evening was £6,600,000, the jackpot for the Lotto Golden Jubilee Draw was £10,000,000. Again on 6 November 2004, to celebrate The National Lottery's 10th anniversary, Camelot once again introduced another special one-off jackpot-only draw, known as the Lotto 10th Anniversary Draw. The jackpot for this bonus draw, like with the Lotto Golden Jubilee Draw, was £10,000,000. Once again on 29 April 2006, in response to Camelot's rival Chariot introducing a Monday Lotto draw that enters your ticket into their two draws each Monday, another one-off bonus jackpot-only draw for Lotto, known as the Lotto Monday Spoiler Draw was once again introduced by Camelot. The jackpot for this bonus draw was £5,000,000. These bonus draws were included in the main Lotto game and gave players another chance at winning the jackpot on their Lotto ticket, using the same six numbers entered into the main draw. The rules were the same as Lotto Extra where players must match all six numbers to win the jackpot.

==== October 2013 changes ====
Camelot announced that the ticket price was to double to £2 from 3 October 2013, with prizes restructured. The announcement was followed by news that large bonuses were to be set aside for management pay, which drew criticism.

The arrival of the "New Lotto" meant bigger jackpots with an estimated average of £1.1 million extra for Saturday's draw and £400,000 on Wednesday. Players matching three numbers receive an extra £15, up from £10 before and an extra £40 for matching 4 numbers. Those matching five numbers receive £500 less, and £50,000 less when matching five numbers + the bonus ball, compared to the former system.

As part of the refresh, a new Lotto Raffle was introduced, with at least 50 winners of £20,000 per draw. The announcement and launch of the refreshed Lotto game caused controversy due to the price increase (dubbed as a "tax on the poor"). The new game launched with a £10,000,000 jackpot and 1,000 Lotto Raffle winners of £20,000.

==== October 2015 changes ====
From 10 October 2015, Camelot announced further changes to the Lotto game which increased the pool of numbers from 49 to 59. Rollovers are no longer limited in number, instead the size of the jackpot is capped; the cap is reached after about 14 rollovers. When the jackpot gets to £50 million, if no-one matches all six main numbers the jackpot will rollover to the following draw. In the event nobody matches all six numbers on that draw the jackpot "rolls down" and is combined with the prize fund for the next prize category where there is at least one winner.

Since the rule changes in October 2015 there is also a "match 2" prize of a free lucky dip ticket for another draw, with odds of doing so at 1 in 10. This created much criticism as the breakdown of prizes announced by Camelot includes the value of these prizes (£2 each winner) within the draw's prize fund even though each match 2 prize winner does not see any monetary value unless their ticket matches three main numbers or more in the following draw. Included with each Lotto ticket is the Millionaire Lotto Raffle where 20 players win £20,000 each and one player wins £1 million per draw.

==== January 2016 changes ====
In January 2016, the Lotto jackpot reached the £50 million cap and rolled over once more to reach a record-breaking £66 million. This was won by two ticket holders who received £33 million each. In August of that year, the jackpot cap was lowered to £22 million. If nobody won the jackpot when it reached £22 million or more, it would roll to the next draw one final time. Then, the jackpot must be won: if no-one matched all six main numbers, the jackpot prize was to be shared by the players with the most winning numbers.

Division of 17.82% of the sales = X
Matching numbers	% of X	Odds of winning
4 numbers	12.9%	2,179 to 1
5 numbers	2.0%	144,414 to 1
5 numbers and bonus ball	1.9%	7,509,578 to 1
6 numbers	83.2%	45,057,473 to 1
The overall odds of winning any prize are 9.3 to 1.

From October 2015 until October 2018, the total prize fund was 47.50% of draw sales in a normal week, including the raffle. The three-ball prize winners, with odds of 96 to 1, received £25 each; the two-ball prize winners received a free £2 entry. 17.82% of the sales are divided as shown in the table and split equally with the number of winners for each selection. In October 2018 the Lotto Raffle was discontinued.

==== November 2018 changes ====
Wednesday 21 November 2018 brought significant changes. Ever since the game's inception, all prizes levels from "match 4" and above varied depending on the number of winners at each level and on total ticket sales. From this date, each prize level except for the jackpot is a fixed amount per winner, similar to the Thunderball and Set For Life draws. To make these changes possible, the Lotto Millionaire raffle was discontinued. The ticket price of £2 and number pool (6 from 1–59) remained the same.

Rollovers are limited to five. If nobody matches all six main numbers after the fifth rollover, the jackpot is shared between every prize winner including match 2 winners from October 2020. This is called a "Jackpot Rolldown". Every cash prize therefore increases substantially (with estimated amounts in brackets).

Category	Odds x to 1 (per entry)	Average prize per winner
6 numbers	45,057,473	Average maximum £13 million.
5 numbers + bonus number	7,509,578	£1,000,000 (£1,100,000)
5 numbers	144,414	£1,750 (£6,000)
4 numbers	2,179	£140 (£200)
3 numbers	96	£30 (£65)
2 numbers	9.3	Lucky Dip with value £2 (£5 Guaranteed + Free lucky dip)
Total	8.3	£9

Expected jackpots: £2,000,000 minimum with an average maximum of around £8,000,000, give or take.

Lotto Event Draws. All prize levels have a fixed prize amount. Due to this payout structure on occasion there will be a larger allocated prize fund than required to pay out all winners. This additional prize money is then placed into a reserve fund which is used when additional winners have winning matches. Once this surplus amount reaches a specified value a special event "must be won" draw is offered with a jackpot of £12 million. (rolling down if no match 6 winner). On Saturday 24 August 2019, Camelot also ran a "double prize" event. All cash prizes were doubled although this has not been repeated since.

==== June 2026 changes ====
Wednesday 10 June brought more significant changes to the Lotto draw. For the first time, players now get two chances to win the jackpot or any of the smaller prizes as each line entered now enters the same numbers into the two draw rounds of Lotto on its draw days every Wednesday and Saturday, with both machines in Rounds 1 and 2 drawing six main balls and a bonus ball from two sets of 59 balls, which follows a similar concept to the previous Lotto Extra and occasional Lotto Bonus Draws, whilst the cost per line remained at £2. Tickets for the New Lotto went on sale from Sunday 7 June. Whilst the odds of winning a prize doubled, for the changes to be made possible, all the lower prize tiers except the Match 5 + Bonus have been significantly reduced, and the free lucky dip (value £2) for matching 2 main numbers was replaced by a £1 cash prize.

New Lotto odds and payouts
Match	Prize (Rounds 1 and 2)	Odds of winning
6 numbers	A share of the Jackpot	1 in 22,528,738
5 numbers + Bonus Ball	£1 million	1 in 3,754,790
5 numbers	£1,000	1 in 72,208
4 numbers	£50	1 in 1,091
3 numbers	£10	1 in 48.4
2 numbers	£1	1 in 5.4

Although players can win any of the smaller cash prizes from both rounds of Lotto with their entered numbers on each line, players cannot combine winning numbers drawn in round 1 with those drawn in round 2, that is to say, matching one number in each round does not win the player a Match 2 prize. Jackpot rollovers still remain at a maximum limit of five. If no one wins the jackpot in the Must Be Won draw, players matching 2 main numbers win £5, whilst players matching 3 main numbers may also win a boosted cash prize if there is any rolldown money left over from the jackpot. The Lotto Raffle was also reinstated for special event draws, where in addition to entering the main Lotto draw, players will also have a chance to win one of a number of guaranteed £1 million raffle prizes, with a raffle number being printed for each line entered into the Lotto draws. The first of these special event draws on New Lotto took place on 4 July 2026, and there were 10 Guaranteed Millionaire Raffle Codes drawn on that date.

==== Thunderball ====
The Thunderball jackpot draw requires players to pick five main numbers from 1 to 39 and one 'Thunderball' number from 1 to 14 for an entry fee of £1 per line. Prizes are won by matching the Thunderball number or at least three main numbers alone. The more numbers matched, the bigger the prize won. The top prize, now £500,000, is won by matching all five main numbers as well as the Thunderball. The lowest prize is £3 for matching the Thunderball alone. Draws take place four times a week – Tuesdays, Wednesdays, Fridays and Saturdays – and are shown live on the official website and on their YouTube channel at 20:00 on Tuesday & Fridays, and at 20:15 on Wednesdays & Saturdays.

The first Thunderball draw was held on 12 June 1999 and the draw was originally only held on Saturdays, however, from 23 October 2002, the draw was held on Wednesdays too. From 2006 to 2008, only the Saturday draw was televised, while on Wednesday the draw took place prior to the live TV show and the winning results were announced during the show.

The rules of Thunderball changed substantially on 9 May 2010. Before this date, Thunderball matches were drawn from numbers 1 to 34; there was no prize for matching the Thunderball number alone, and the top prize (for matching five main numbers and the Thunderball) was half the current jackpot at £250,000. After this date, the Friday draw was introduced in addition to the Wednesday and Saturday draws. Following the change of rules, while the chance of winning anything on Thunderball more than doubled, the chance of winning the top prizes more than halved. The Tuesday draw was added on 30 January 2018.

The odds and payouts are as follows:

	Old (1999–2010)		Current (from May 2010)	
Match	Prize	Odds of winning	Prize	Odds of winning
Thunderball only	-	-	£3	1 in 29
1 + Thunderball	£5	1 in 33	£5	1 in 35
2 + Thunderball	£10	1 in 107	£10	1 in 135
3 numbers	£10	1 in 74	£10	1 in 111
3 + Thunderball	£20	1 in 960	£20	1 in 1,437
4 numbers	£100	1 in 2,067	£100	1 in 3,647
4 + Thunderball	£250	1 in 26,866	£250	1 in 47,415
5 numbers	£5,000	1 in 299,661	£5,000	1 in 620,046
5 + Thunderball	£250,000	1 in 3,895,584	£500,000	1 in 8,060,598

==== Set For Life ====
On 18 March 2019, the first Set For Life draw took place. The game offers a top prize of £10,000 per month for thirty years (£3,600,000). Each line costs £1.50, and draws take place every Monday and Thursday at 20:00. Players choose five main numbers from 1 to 47, and one "Life Ball" from 1 to 10.

Set For Life odds and payouts
Match	Prize	Odds of winning
5 + Life Ball	£10,000 every month for 30 years	1 in 15,339,390
5 numbers	£10,000 every month for one year*	1 in 1,704,377
4 + Life Ball	£250	1 in 73,045
4 numbers	£50	1 in 8,116
3 + Life Ball	£30	1 in 1,782
3 numbers	£20	1 in 198
2 + Life Ball	£10	1 in 134
2 numbers	£5	1 in 15
*On 23 May 2019, a Super Chance Draw was held where players could also win £10,000 every month for 30 Years for matching 5 main numbers without the Life Ball. The Super Chance Draw on Set For Life has not been held since then.

==== EuroMillions ====
On Saturday 7 February 2004 the lottery operator Camelot launched a pan-European lottery: EuroMillions. The first draw took place on Friday 13 February 2004 in Paris. The UK, France and Spain were involved initially. Lotteries from Austria, Belgium, Ireland, Luxembourg, Portugal and Switzerland joined the draw on 8 October 2004. The draws are currently made in Paris and shown recorded in the UK on the official website twice a week on Tuesdays and Fridays, approximately three hours after the draw has taken place. The entry fee to the EuroMillions draw is £2.50 per board. The odds of winning the jackpot are 139,838,160 to 1.

==== EuroMillions HotPicks ====
On Friday 26 January 2018, the first EuroMillions HotPicks draw took place. It uses the same five main numbers as the EuroMillions draw and offers players the chance to win one of five fixed prizes from £10 up to £1 million. The game works in a similar way to Lotto HotPicks whereby players have to decide how many numbers they are going to match. If they do not successfully match all of their selected numbers, then no prize is awarded. The following prizes apply:

Choose and match	Prize
1 number	£10
2 numbers	£100
3 numbers	£1,500
4 numbers	£30,000
5 numbers	£1,000,000

==== Powerball ====
Powerball odds and payouts
Match	Prize	Odds Of Winning
5 + Powerball	Jackpot Over 30 Years	1 in 292,201,338
5 numbers	£1 million	1 in 11,688,054
4 + Powerball	Estimated £33,000	1 in 913,129
4 numbers	Estimated £1,100	1 in 36,525
3 + Powerball	Estimated £500	1 in 14,494
3 numbers	Estimated £52.10	1 in 580
2 + Powerball	Estimated £30.80	1 in 701
1 + Powerball	Estimated £15.30	1 in 92
Powerball Only	Estimated £11.90	1 in 38
2 numbers	£8	1 in 28

In 2026, Allwyn have announced that they will partner with the Multi-State Lottery Association to offer Powerball in the UK for the first time ever, marking the first time that the Florida based Lottery game has expanded outside of the United States. It is the biggest rolling-jackpot draw game in the world. Tickets for the first ever UK Powerball draw taking place went on sale on 21 July 2026, with the first draw taking place in the early hours of 23 July. Whilst the lower prize tiers for Powerball in the UK are different to its American counterpart, including an exclusive Match 2 Main Numbers prize, the game uses the same Powerball draw that takes place at Tallahassee in Florida.

Whilst the ever-growing jackpot could potentially make a player a billionaire because of Powerball having an uncapped jackpot, as with Set For Life, the jackpot is paid over 30 years rather than a lump sum. As with Euromillions, all the lower prize tiers (except the Match 2 Main Numbers and Match 5 Main Numbers which are fixed prizes unlike Euromillions) are estimated prizes depending on the number of winners in that prize tier and the currency exchange rate. Players choose 5 main numbers from 1 to 69 and 1 Powerball number from 1 to 26, or a Lucky Dip. The entry fee to the Powerball draw is £4.00 per line. Draws take place in the United States every Tuesday, Thursday and Sunday at around 4am UK Time with tickets needing to be purchased by 11:55pm every Monday, Wednesday and Saturday. The odds of winning the jackpot are 292,201,338 to 1, whilst the overall odds of winning any prize is 1 in 14.

The first Powerball ticket to be sold in the United Kingdom was sold at Sewell On The Go in Pocklington, York, just after 5am.

==== Scratchcards ====
As well as tickets for the draw games, The National Lottery also sells scratchcards. Introduced in 1995, they are small pieces of card where an area has been covered by a thin layer of opaque latex that can be scratched off. Under this are concealed the items/pictures that must be found in order to win. Scratchcards can be purchased in most newsagents and supermarkets; they can cost £1, £2, £3 or £5 and come in many different forms, with a variety of prizes and ways to win. The National Lottery used to offer £10 scratchcards but these were discontinued in September 2019, partly because they were attractive to problem gamblers. The generic scratchcard requires the player to match three of the same prize amounts. If this is accomplished, they win that amount; the highest as of March 2020 being £2,000,000 on a £5 scratchcard. Other scratchcards involve matching symbols, pictures or words.

Initially, all scratchcards were sold for £1, and were originally called National Lottery Instants. Over the years, scratchcards that range in price from £2 to £10 have been available. More expensive scratchcards are larger and offer more games with higher-value prizes. Some scratchcards have jackpots other than one-off payments, such as a yearly sum or a car. Odds for winning a top prize on a scratchcard depend greatly on how many have been sold and whether there are any top prize scratchcards in circulation at time of purchase. As the range of scratchcard games has increased, the odds of winning vary greatly. For a game with the highest available jackpot of £4,000,000, the odds of winning the jackpot are around 1 in 4,000,000, whereas for a game with a low jackpot prize (and thousands of jackpots available), the odds of winning the jackpot are as low as around 1 in 10,000.

==== Online Instant Wins ====
Instant Win games are online games where the player can win prizes instantly. Some games are similar in format to scratchcards, with others involving more interactive play such as dice-rolling or matching special symbols. It is made clear that the Instant Win games are solely based on luck and that no skill or judgement is involved. Players must be registered in order to buy or try an Instant Win. "Try" games are free of charge and no payouts are made in respect of any prizes. As with scratchcards, there are a wide variety of Instant Win games available with different odds of winning prizes. The cost to play varies from 25p to £5. The current highest prize is £1 million on a £5 game. Odds of winning a top prize vary on each Instant Win game, and may be higher or lower than their scratchcard counterpart.

==== UK Millionaire Maker ====
Introduced in November 2009, each EuroMillions ticket purchased in the UK contains a unique "UK Millionaire Maker" code, consisting of four letters and five numbers. There is one winner per draw (with the exception of a special draw), with the winner receiving a fixed £1,000,000. Odds of winning depend on the number of tickets sold for that particular draw in the UK, but are generally 1 in 1,900,000 on Tuesdays and 1 in 2,950,000 on Fridays.

=== Discontinued games ===
==== Lotto Extra ====
Lotto Extra odds and payouts
Match	Prize	Odds of winning
6 numbers	Jackpot	1 in 13,983,815
The maximum jackpot was £50m. If no one matched all six numbers by the time the jackpot reached £50m, the prize rolls down to players matching five, if none then four, if none then three, etc.

Lotto Extra was introduced on 13 November 2000 and was originally called Lottery Extra but renamed Lotto Extra on 18 May 2002. It was an add-on from the main draw where a player could select "Lotto Extra same numbers" or a lucky dip. Players would pick six numbers from 49 and there were no lower tier prizes so a perfect match was required. The draw was originally televised on both Wednesdays and Saturdays, but after the introduction of Wednesday's Thunderball draw on 23 October 2002, only the Saturday draw was televised as the Wednesday draw took place prior to the live TV show, and the winning results for Lotto Extra on Wednesdays was shown after the main Lotto draw; this was due to the 5 minute timeslot allocated to the midweek draws on BBC One. Due to poor sales on the draw's last few years, the last draw was on 8 July 2006 and it was replaced by Dream Number.

==== Dream Number ====
Dream Number odds and payouts
Match	Prize	Odds of winning
1st digit only	£2	1 in 11.2
1st 2 digits	£10	1 in 111.2
1st 3 digits	£100	1 in 1,111.2
1st 4 digits	£500	1 in 11,112
1st 5 digits	£5,000	1 in 111,112
1st 6 digits	£50,000	1 in 1,111,112
all 7 digits	£500,000	1 in 10,000,000
The overall odds of winning any prize were 1 in 10. Source: National Lottery Players Guide

Dream Number was launched on 15 July 2006. It involved a random seven-digit number generated for entry into the main draw. It was played independently of Lotto, or if played with Lotto one Dream Number was generated per ticket, not per Lotto entry. The cost of entry was £1. A dream number was printed on every Lotto ticket bought, whether the player had chosen to enter it into the draw or not. Unlike other Lotto games, it was not possible to choose the number entered, and the order in which the digits were drawn was significant, as the digits had to be matched in the same order for the player to win. Players had to match with the first digit in order to start winning prizes (ranging from £2 to £500,000), which meant that 90% of players lost as soon as the first ball was drawn. Three Dream Number machines were made and were named Peridot, Tourmaline and Aventurine, and were custom made single digit air mix machines manufactured by Smartplay International Inc. Draws took place on Wednesdays and Saturdays. Originally, the draw was televised on both Wednesdays and Saturdays, but was latterly only televised on Saturdays, when the Wednesday draw took place prior to the live TV show and the winning dream number was announced during the show. All money raised for good causes from Dream Number went towards the 2012 Summer Olympics and 2012 Summer Paralympics in London. The National Lottery closed the Dream Number game on Wednesday 9 February 2011, which was also the date of the last Dream Number draw. It was then replaced by Lotto Plus 5.

==== Daily Play ====
Daily Play odds and payouts
Match	Prize	Odds of winning
0 numbers	£1 Daily Play; Lucky Dip Ticket	1 in 11.5
4 numbers	£5	1 in 22.3
5 numbers	£30	1 in 222.6
6 numbers	£300	1 in 6,343.1
7 numbers	£30,000	1 in 888,030
The overall odds of winning a prize were 1 in 7.4; Source: National Lottery Daily Play Game Rules & Procedures

The Daily Play draw started on Monday 22 September 2003 and could be played every day except Sunday and Christmas Day. By selecting seven numbers between 1 and 27, players could win anything from a free lucky dip to £30,000. The draw gave its players the chance to win a free daily play lucky-dip for not matching any numbers in the draw. The entry fee to the Daily Play draw was £1 per board.

Daily Play draws were broadcast via a webcast. In addition, from March 2005 to October 2005, the Daily Play draw was broadcast live on Challenge TV in the Glory Ball show, hosted by Jean Anderson, James McCourt, Jayne Sharp and Nikki Cowan.

The National Lottery Daily Play Draw ended for good on Friday 6 May 2011.

==== Lotto Plus 5 ====
Lotto Plus 5 odds and payouts
Matching Numbers	Prize	Odds of winning
3 numbers	£2.50	56.65592 to 1
4 numbers	£25	1,032.397 to 1
5 numbers	£250	55,491.33 to 1
5 numbers and bonus ball	£25,000	2,330,636 to 1
6 numbers	£250,000	13,983,815 to 1
The overall odds of winning any prize is 52.65514 to 1 per draw.
The overall odds of winning any prize is 10.13855 to 1 per Plus 5 draw week.

Lotto Plus 5 was introduced in 2011 to plug the gaps between the Wednesday and Saturday Lotto draws, meaning it takes place on Mondays, Tuesdays, Thursdays, Fridays and Sundays. Players can enter by paying an extra £1 when buying their Lotto ticket, which enters the same ticket numbers into five separate draws. Each draw offers fixed prizes for matching 3, 4, 5 and 6 numbers, with the jackpot being worth £250,000. It has been estimated that the game produces an extra 500,000 Lotto winners every week. The Lotto Plus 5 draw was also the only National Lottery draw game to use a computer generated Automated Draw Machine (Random Number Generator) instead of a Mechanical Draw Machine, as used with their raffle games such as the Euromillions Millionaire Maker Code. Due to the changes to the main Lotto game (most notably the introduction of the Lotto raffle), Plus 5 was discontinued; The last Plus 5 draw was played on Tuesday 1 October 2013, with the last date to buy a ticket being Monday 23 September 2013.

==== Vernons Easy Play ====
In August 1998, The National Lottery joined Vernons to create a lottery similar to the football pools. Players marked a playslip to state how many lines they wanted to play. Tickets were £1 per entry. The lottery terminal allocated 10 football fixtures on the player's ticket, and the player attempted to match these fixtures that resulted in a score draw (1–1, 2–2, 3–3 and so on).

To win, players had to match at least five fixtures which resulted in a score draw; this always won £5. Matching six won between £6 and £530, depending on how many total score draws there were in total over all the fixtures played. Matching seven score draws won between £27 and £67,000 depending on total score draws, and matching eight won from £1,850 to £667,000. Thus, the more score draws there were, the easier it was to win.

The game was not a success and was discontinued at the end of the 1998–9 football season, in April 1999.

==== Big Draw / Christmas Millionaire Maker ====
Big Draw / Christmas Millionaire Maker odds and payouts
Matching Years	Prize	Odds of winning
2 years	£40	1 in 40
2 + bonus year	£100	1 in 890
3 years	£150	1 in 890
3 + bonus year	£1,500	1 in 27,272
4 years	£2,000	1 in 54,544
4 + bonus year	£100,000	1 in 2,536,282
5 years	£10,000,000	1 in 12,547,920

Originally a special one-off draw, which was made to commemorate the arrival of the new millennium on 31 December 1999, but was brought back in 2000 to celebrate the next new year, and in 2001, 2002 and 2003 to celebrate Christmas on 24 December each year.

Players would choose six years from a hundred or a lucky dip on their Big Draw/Christmas Millionaire Maker ticket for the first game. In Big Draw 2000, the year pool was from 1900 to 1999, 1901 to 2000 for Big Draw 2001, 1902 to 2001 for Christmas Millionaire Maker 2001, 1903 to 2002 for Christmas Millionaire Maker 2002, and 1904 to 2003 for Christmas Millionaire Maker 2003.

Five years and a bonus year were drawn. If a player matched all five years drawn, they won the jackpot. If no-one won the jackpot on the first game, the prize money would roll down to players winning the next prize level. For each entry into game one, players would be automatically entered into game two.

Two years – one from 1000 to 1999 and another from 2000 to 2999 – randomly allocated by the lottery terminal, were printed below each game one selection, and if the player matched both years on their ticket, they would win £1,000,000.

One machine was used for the first game, but for the second game two pairs of machines were used: first a left machine with the numbers from 10 to 19, and a right machine with 00 to 99; secondly a left machine with 20 to 29, and again a right machine with 00 to 99. One number was drawn at random from each of those machines, each pair creating a year. Each ticket cost £5 per board.

==== Millionaire Raffle (original run 2013-18) ====
Camelot introduced the Lotto Raffle in October 2013, which was renamed Millionaire Raffle in October 2015. A raffle number was included with each line of Lotto numbers bought. Each raffle number consisted of a colour and eight numbers (e.g. AQUA 4579 2965), and each winning raffle number won a fixed amount of £20,000.

Until October 2015, 50 raffle numbers were drawn with each Lotto draw and the number of raffle winners increased by 50 each time the Lotto jackpot rolled over, with as many as 250 raffle winners in the event of a quadruple rollover. From 10 October 2015, the prize structure was changed, with 20 prizes of £20,000 and one prize of £1,000,000 with each Lotto draw. The Millionaire Raffle was discontinued after 17 November 2018 when the Lotto draw rules changed.

== Other ways to play ==
As well as in shops, tickets can be purchased online. After registering an account, players can play regular numbers by direct debit, or load their account with money and play as and when they choose. Winners are notified by email.

Other ways to play have been discontinued:

- Until September 2009, Lotto and EuroMillions were available through Sky Active. Players could purchase up to eight weeks' worth of tickets at a time.
- From October 2004 to 30 June 2013, it was possible to play by text.
- From July 2015, lucky dip tickets could be purchased through Barclays' Pingit app. Pingit was discontinued on 30 June 2021.

== Olympic Lottery ==
Following the success of London's bid to host the 2012 Summer Olympics, Olympic Lottery Scratchcards were launched on 27 July 2005 under the brand name "Go for Gold". 28% of the price of £1 went to the Olympic Lottery Distribution Fund, and the scratchcards were intended to raise £750,000,000 towards the cost of staging the games.

== On television ==
The majority of National Lottery draws take place on live television. The first National Lottery show (entitled The National Lottery Live: The First Draw) was at 7 pm on Saturday 19 November 1994. Presented by Noel Edmonds, this was an hour long special, in which 49 contestants competed to become the first person to start the draw, the winner being 18-year-old Deborah Walsh. The first number to be drawn was 30. For its first few years, the TV show took the title The National Lottery Live, and was presented mainly by Anthea Turner or Bob Monkhouse. Other notable presenters during this period included Dale Winton, Carol Smillie, Terry Wogan and Ulrika Jonsson. On 30 November 1996, live on BBC1, the draw machine failed to start.

During the 2000 Today broadcast on 31 December 1999, a special Big Draw 2000 drawing was held to ring in the new millennium. Exactly twelve months later, on 31 December 2000, this special draw was revisited when Big Draw 2001 was held. This special draw would continue to run for another 3 years afterwards, in 2001, 2002 and 2003, but was held on 24 December every year to celebrate Christmas, and was renamed "Christmas Millionaire Maker" to fit in with this celebration.

On 6 November 2004, The National Lottery celebrated 10 years with a special two-part show, called the National Lottery 10th Birthday Celebration broadcast on BBC One. The first part of the show featured celebrity contestants playing a special quiz-show featuring a first round from Wright Around the World, an In The Red round of Jet Set, raising money in Winner's Row on In It to Win It, and a Wonderwall round of Winning Lines. The second part of the show featured the £10 Million Bonus Lotto Draw, and a musical performance by Anastacia with her new single.

On 20 May 2006, during the draw on The National Lottery Jet Set that took place minutes before the Eurovision Song Contest 2006, several members of the group Fathers 4 Justice protested on the set causing the show to be taken off air for several minutes while the protesters were removed from the studio.

On 7 November 2015, live on BBC One, the Lotto draw machine failed to release all the balls, causing the draw to be postponed. The draw later took place off air, and the results were posted on the website.

Originally, the draws would take place in the BBC studio during the game show on Saturdays (and sometimes Wednesdays). However, since 23 September 2006, the channel airing the lottery draw has pre-recorded the non-draw parts of the show and then switched to National Lottery HQ for the live draws.

Wednesday draws at first had a 10-minute slot on BBC One, in the same set as the game show in the BBC studio, and presented by the same host. In later years the broadcast was hosted by various presenters in the National Lottery HQ studio; presenters included Gethin Jones, Christopher Biggins, John Barrowman, OJ Borg, Matt Johnson and Jenni Falconer. Alan Dedicoat provides the voice-over announcing the balls drawn, sometimes interacting with the presenter; he is known as The Voice Of the Balls. Charles Nove is the relief announcer.

From January 2012, in an initiative to spread BBC productions across the United Kingdom, all lottery shows were relocated to BBC Scotland.

From January 2013, the Tuesday, Wednesday and Friday draws were no longer broadcast, but could be viewed on the National Lottery's website; there was still a results update on BBC One at 10:45pm. On 24 November 2016, it was announced that the televised draws would be axed and moved to BBC iPlayer in January 2017. The last broadcast was on 31 December 2016.

On 12 April 2018, it was announced that the televised Saturday night draw would be aired on ITV in a 90-second slot with Stephen Mulhern as the new host.

As of 24 January 2024, there had been 2,931 draws – 1,408 Wednesday draws and 1,523 Saturday draws.

In more recent years, two separate concert series have been organised by the National Lottery and these are recorded for broadcasting at a later date. Hosted by Jason Manford, Big Night of Musicals is held annually at Manchester Arena and has been aired on BBC One and BBC Radio 2 since it began in January 2022. The second concert was entitled New Year's Eve Big Bash, an end-of-year variety show held at Wembley Arena in London that was aired each December on ITV. It ran for three editions from 2022 to 2024. In November 2025, it was reported that the latter show would not return as part of ITV's festive schedule for 2025. Other one-off events include the Big Jubilee Street Party, held at Manchester Arena in May 2022 and the Big Eurovision Welcome, an outdoor show at St George's Hall, Liverpool to celebrate the city hosting the 2023 song contest.

=== National Lottery Xtra ===
Between 10 March 2008 and 1 February 2010, the "National Lottery Xtra" channel was broadcast on Freeview channel 45 for one hour a day. Programming included content from winners of the jackpot and National Lottery Good Causes projects, as well as behind-the-scenes footage on how the National Lottery was operated.

== Good causes ==
1. NLDF (25.0%)
2. Prize fund (53.0%)
3. State (12.0%)
4. Organisers & sellers (10.0%)

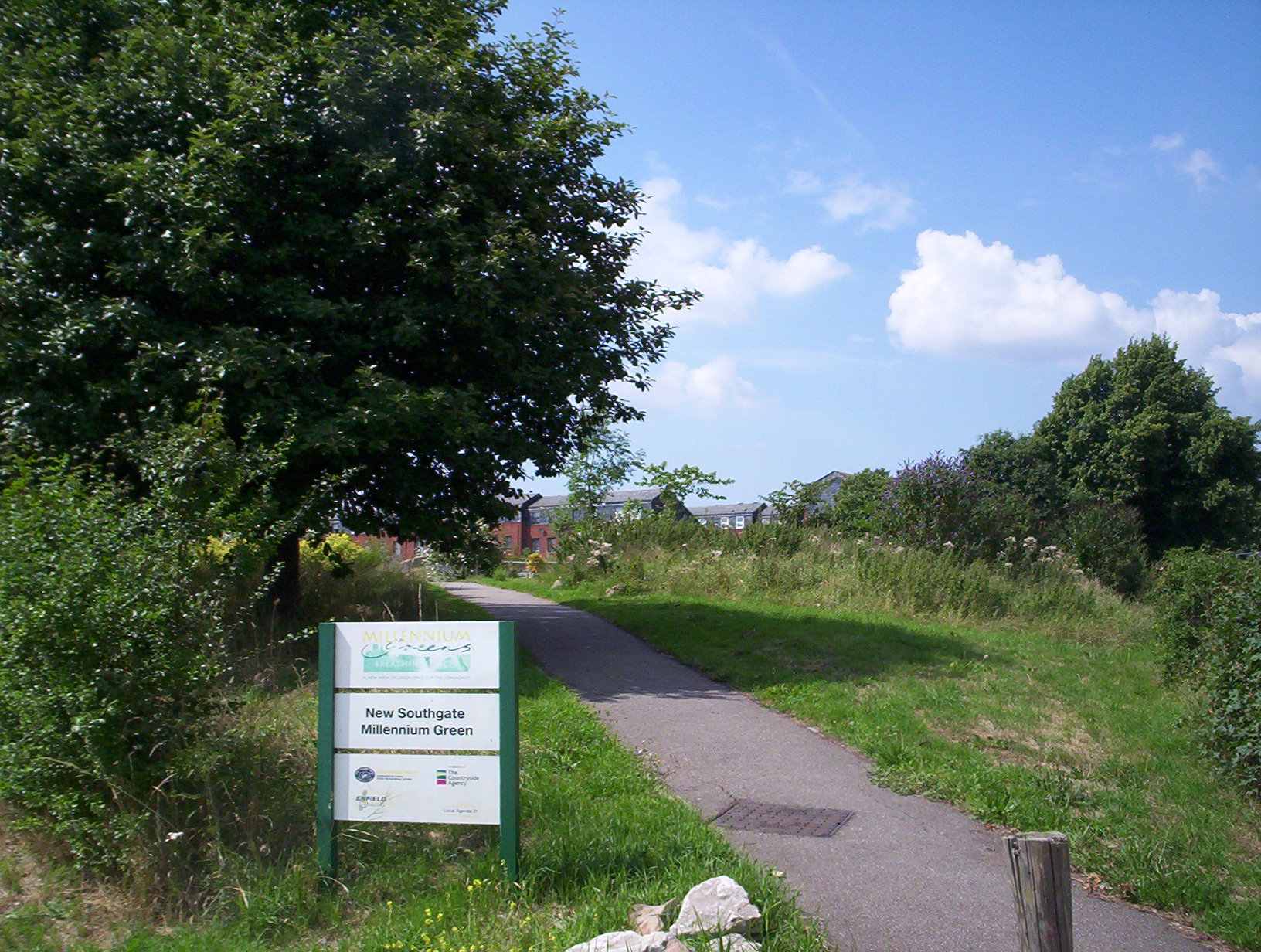
One of the 245 Millennium Greens created by the Countryside Agency with National Lottery money

In March 2022, it was announced that the UK national lottery raised £1.84 billion for good causes from March 2021 to March 2022 in a new yearly record.

By 2016, the National Lottery had raised about £35 billion for 'good causes', a programme which distributes money via grants. 25% of lottery revenue goes towards the fund, along with all unclaimed prizes. Additionally, 12% goes to the state. The prize fund is about 53% of revenue, with the remaining 10% going towards running costs and profits for the lottery organisers and ticket sellers.

The distribution of money to 'good causes' is not the responsibility of the operator (Allwyn Entertainment). It is the responsibility of the twelve distributors that make up The National Lottery Distribution Fund (NLDF), administered by the government Department for Culture, Media and Sport (which also sponsors the British Film Institute, which uses a portion of the National Lottery's funds to encourage film production). At present, 40% is awarded to health, education, environment and charitable causes, 20% to Sports, 20% to Arts and 20% to Heritage. On 19 November 2014, the National Lottery celebrated 20 years of its Good Causes fund, which as of 2014, has raised £32 billion for charities and projects in the UK. The National Lottery celebrated the 20th anniversary with the, 'Just Imagine' campaign which highlighted how the money has filtered through society to improve UK communities. Notable facts included that Good Causes had funded over 1300 elite athletes including Sir Chris Hoy, invested £43.5 million into the National Cycle Network and funded 12,700 after school clubs.

The Heritage Lottery Fund was set up by the government in 1994 to provide money for "projects involving the local, regional and national heritage". The funds come from the money raised by the National Lottery's 'Good Causes'. Since 1994, the Heritage Lottery Fund has given grants totalling approximately £4 billion to more than 26,000 projects.

In 2004, on the 10th anniversary of the National Lottery, the National Lottery Awards were instituted as an annual event to provide recognition of the work of Lottery funded projects around the UK. Certain projects are selected as the best in particular categories. The trophies were designed and produced by Gaudio Awards.

== Percentage return ==
The National Lottery is a jackpot system with the majority of winnings going to those few players who pick all six numbers. The average percentage return is the share of the ticket sales devoted to prize funds, about 45% (i.e., 45% of the money spent on tickets would be won in prizes). The spread of returns will be very wide and influenced by several factors that change week-by-week (e.g. the number of tickets sold, the "distinctiveness" and popularity of the winning numbers). Over an extremely long period the return on investment would approach the average, about 45% (a 55% loss). Over a shorter period there is a very small chance of a big win, but otherwise an average return of less than 45%; a numerical experiment using 10,000 random sets of numbers each week between 1997 and 2001 found that, had the tickets been bought, the rate of return would have been 29%.

In their book Scenarios for Risk Management and Global Investment Strategies, academics Rachel E S Ziemba and William T Ziemba say with regard to 6/49 lotteries, "Random numbers have an expected loss of about 55%. However, six-tuples of unpopular numbers have an edge with expected returns exceeding their cost by about 65%. The expected value rises and approaches $2.25 per dollar wagered when there are carryovers [UK term: rollovers]. Random numbers, such as those from lucky dip and quick pick, and popular numbers are worth more with carryovers but never have an advantage." They conclude that, due to the time that would be required to achieve success, "except for millionaires and pooled syndicates, it is not possible to use the unpopular numbers in a scientific way to beat the lotto and have high confidence of becoming rich; these aspiring millionaires will also most likely be residing in a cemetery when their distant heirs reach the goal".

== Unclaimed prizes ==
Winning tickets must be claimed within 180 days of the draw taking place. If a prize is unclaimed within that time, it is distributed through the National Lottery Distribution Fund. For all major prizes (£50,000 and over) approximately two weeks after the draw, if no claim has been received, the geographical area in which the ticket was purchased is released to the public.

The highest unclaimed prize distributed this way to date was a winning ticket worth £63,837,543.60 which was bought in the Stevenage and Hitchin area for the Euromillions draw of 8 June 2012. This was a world record unclaimed prize. All investment income from unclaimed prizes also goes to good causes via the National Lottery Distribution Fund.

== Regulation ==
The National Lottery is regulated by the Gambling Commission. Previous regulators were the Office of the National Lottery until 1 April 1999, and the National Lottery Commission – a non-departmental public body reporting to the Department of Culture, Media and Sport – until 1 October 2013.

The Lottery was set up in 1993 under the National Lottery etc. Act 1993 and was reformed under the National Lottery Act 1998 and the National Lottery Act 2006.

The National Lottery is a member of the World Lottery Association.

== See also ==
- National Lottery Community Fund
- Heritage Lottery Fund
- Millennium Commission
- National Health Service Lottery
- National Lottery (Ireland)
- The Health Lottery
- List of lotteries
