= Karel Komárek =

Czech businessman (born 1969)

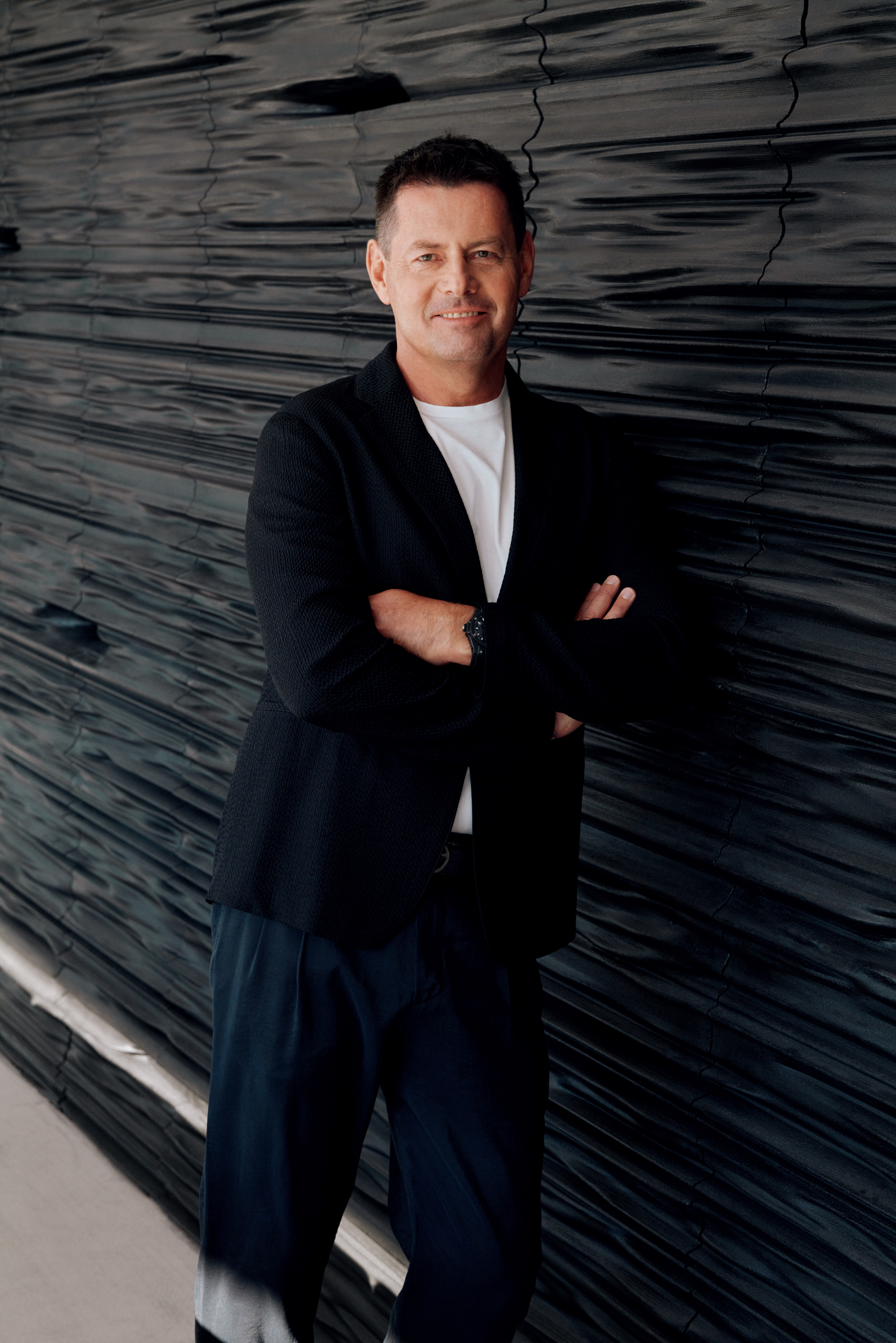
- Komárek in 2023
- Born: 15 March 1969 (age 56); Hodonín, Czech Republic
- Occupation(s): Businessman, philanthropist
- Years active: 1992–present
- Known for: Founder of KKCG
- Spouse: Štěpánka Komárková (m. 2015)
- Children: 4

Karel Komárek (born 15 March 1969) is a Czech businessman worth $9.4 billion as of March 2024. He is one of the wealthiest Czech citizens and the founder of the investment company KKCG.

== Personal life ==
Komárek was born in Hodonín, Czech Republic, on 15 March 1969. He graduated in engineering and then worked briefly at Sigma Hodonín.

Komárek married Štěpánka Komárková in 2015, his second marriage. He has four children, and resides in Verbier, Switzerland.

== Business career ==
In 1992, Komárek founded the industrial valves wholesale company M.O.S. Hodonín with a start-up capital of CZK 300,000 borrowed from his father. In 1995 Komárek founded the internationally active investment company KKCG. In 1996, his company M.O.S. Hodonín changed its name to MOS Hodonín Morovia Systems and developed into a technology supplier for the mining industry, allowing Komárek to enter the energy business. This was followed by the energy production company Moravské naftové doly (now MND Group), which now belongs to Komárek's investment company KKCG.

Komárek is chairman of the board of trustees at the Karel Komárek Family Foundation, alongside his wife Štěpánka.

=== KKCG ===
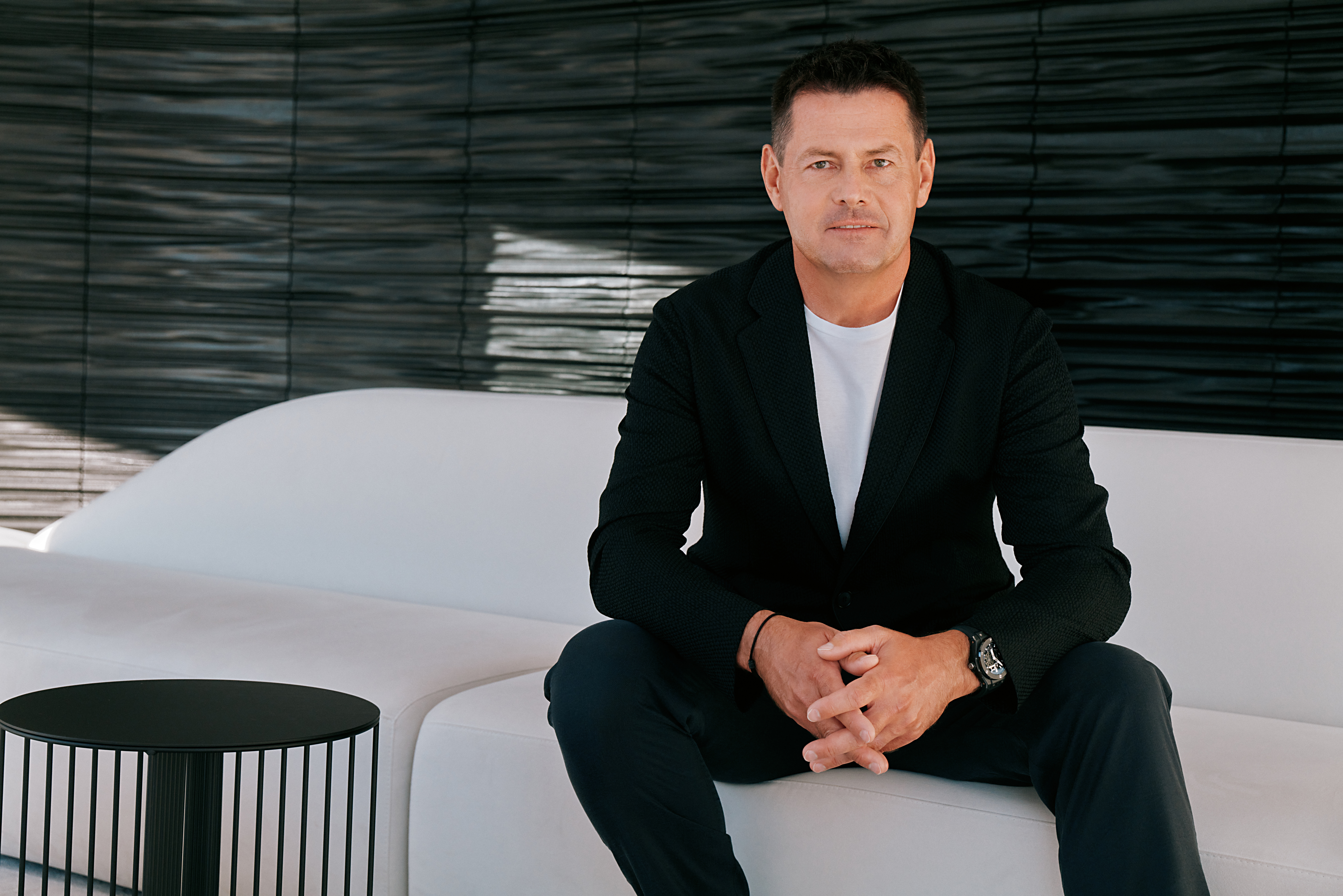
Komárek in 2023

KKCG's business activities comprise lotteries and gambling, energy, information technology, and investments. Its member companies include Allwyn, MND, ARICOMA Group, KKCG Real Estate Group, Springtide Ventures venture capital fund, and others. As of 2022, KKCG operated in 33 countries.

In 2012, KKCG became the sole owner of the largest Czech lottery company Sazka, which later served as the cornerstone for the establishment of Europe's gambling conglomerate, the Sazka Group. In 2021, Sazka Group's parent, Sazka Entertainment, rebranded to Allwyn. Allwyn's portfolio includes Camelot UK, Camelot US (operators of the Illinois State Lottery), Opap (Greece and Cyprus), Casag (Austria), Sazka (Czech Republic), and Lottoitalia (Italy).

KKCG has also made investments in information technologies and is active on the real estate market. It has completed various "top rezidence" residential projects in Prague. In June 2021, it finished the Bořislavka Office and Shopping Center in the Prague 6 district.

In 2023, KKCG opened a methanol factory in West Virginia through the company US Methanol, which was founded by KKCG in 2016.

=== Wealth ===
In 2018, Bloomberg estimated Komárek's worth at $3.3 billion. In 2019, Forbes ranked Komárek in 715th place among the world's billionaires with estimated worth of $3 billion; in 2022, Forbes ranked him in 502nd place with estimated worth of $5.3 billion. Bloomberg values his net worth at US$8.18 billion as of February 2023. His net worth was reported at US$9 billion in 2024 by Forbes, ranking him as 303rd in the world.

== Philanthropy ==
Komárek founded the Karel Komárek Family Foundation, which supports the Dvořák Prague International Music Festival, which he co-founded in 2008, and the Proměny Foundation. The Proměny Foundation focuses on the development of public space in the Czech Republic and in particular the reconstruction of parks and school gardens. The Foundation participated, among other things, in the reconstruction of the Park Střed in Most.

In 2020, the Karel Komárek Family Foundation launched a project in which it donated instruments to Czech schools and purchased 11 pianos worth 200,000 euros from the Czech manufacturer Petrof to be donated. At the same time he started a public collection of instruments for 45 other schools. In 2023, the second fundraising campaign was launched to procure 21 instruments worth CZK 10.3 million, half of which will be raised by the KKFF. In August 2021, it donated CZK 150 million to the reconstruction of Hodonín after the town was devastated by a tornado in June 2021.

Komárek received the Gold Medal in the Arts from the John F. Kennedy Center for the Performing Arts for his achievements in the field of art. He and his wife have also supported the construction of the "Reach center" building in the Kennedy Center in 2019.
