= Emma Capital =

Investment management company

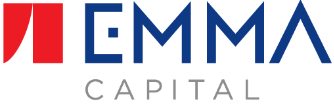
- Type: private
- Industry: diversified investment
- Founder: Jiří Šmejc
- Headquarters: Nicosia, Cyprus (registered office)
- Key people: Jiří Šmejc (CEO)
- Operating income: ▲€162.6 million (2019)
- Net income: ▲€630.2 million (2019)
- Total assets: ▲€1.646 billion (2019)
- Total equity: ▲€1.119 billion (2019)
- Owner: MEF Holdings (94.9%); Others (5.06%)
- Parent: Emma Capital
- Subsidiaries: Emma Gamma (100%); Emma Omega (100%); Premier Energy Cyprus (100%); Allwyn AG (100%)
- Footnotes in a consolidated basis, excluding minority interests,

Emma Capital (stylised as EMMA Capital) is an investment management group which owns and actively manages companies in the various sectors primarily across the Central and Eastern Europe, such as logistics (Packeta or BoxNow), gaming (SuperSport or STS), energy (Premier Energy) or marinas (Marina 21).

== History ==
EMMA Capital was founded by former PPF shareholder Jiří Šmejc. In 2013 Šmejc withdrew as a shareholder of PPF. In turn, Šmejc acquired the minority share of Home Credit, in which PPF remains as the major shareholder. Šmejc has put the stake to EMMA Omega, which belongs to EMMA Capital structure. Another portfolio, Eldorado, was jointly sold by EMMA Capital and PPF in 2016.

== Group structure ==
=== EMMA Capital ===
EMMA Capital is the investment management company of the group, in which (as of August 2025) Jiří Šmejc owns 54% stake. The other partners are Pavel Horák, Tomáš Kočka, Ondřej Frydrych, Jose Garza, Michal Houšť, Peter Stohr and Marek Doseděl.

=== EMMA Alpha ===
EMMA Alpha is the main holding entity of the group in which the founder and majority owner of EMMA Capital, Jiří Šmejc, owns approx. 92% investment shares via his own company MEF Holdings (the rest is owned by other partners). EMMA Capital owns 100% voting share of EMMA Alpha as manager. EMMA Alpha owns directly or indirectly stakes in all companies within EMMA Capital Group. is the parent company of EMMA Gamma and EMMA Omega.

As of August 2025, EMMA Alpha also owns more than 70% in Premier Energy Plc (listed on the Bucharest Stock Exchange). EMMA Gamma is 100% owned by EMMA Alpha. EMMA Gamma owns 22.5% stake Entain CEE which in turn is 100% owner of SuperSport (market leader in Croatia) and STS (market leader in Poland). The stake has been acquired as a consequence of Sazka Group split which has happened in 2019.

Until May 2019, EMMA Gamma used to own 25% stake of Sazka Group; KKCG used to be the major shareholder of Sazka Group for 75% stake. After the split it holds 100% of Sazka Group.
