= Cleverlance Enterprise Solutions =

Czech information technology company

Cleverlance Enterprise Solutions a.s.
- Type: Joint-stock company
- Industry: Information technology
- Founded: 2000. Czech Republic, Prague
- Founder: Jakub Dosoudil, Jan Šeda, Dobromil Podpěra
- Headquarters: Voctářova 2500/20a, 180 00 Praha 8, Prague, Czech Republic
- Revenue: 785,020,000 Czech koruna (2018)
- Operating income: 29,497,000 Czech koruna (2018)
- Net income: 20,984,000 Czech koruna (2018)
- Total assets: 268,435,000 Czech koruna (2018)
- Number of employees: 209 (2018)
- Parent: Invinit Group
- Website: cleverlance.de/en

Cleverlance Enterprise Solutions A.S. is a company specializing in information technology. The company's headquarters and branches are located in The Czech Republic, Prague, Brno, Bratislava and Bremen respectively. Cleverlance develops its own products, integrates IT platforms, and provides analytical services as well as software testing. These services are offered to clients ranging from financial institutions, telecommunications, to automotive industries. Since the 30th of October 2017, Cleverlance has been a member of the Association of Virtual and Augmented Reality. The company is currently working on several applications of VR and AR.

== History ==
=== Origins ===
Cleverlance was founded in 1999 in Czechia as a company that specialized in developing the Java EE platform. The founding members were Jakub Dosoudil, Jan Šeda, and Dobromil Podpěra. Jan Šeda later sold his share in the company to the other founders. In 2004, Cleverlance Group was founded.

=== Death of Dosoudil ===
During the 2004 Christmas holidays, one of the founding members of Cleverlance, Jakub Dosoudil (27 years old at the time), went to Thailand with his girlfriend, Michaela Beránková (25 years old at the time, also working for Cleverlance). They died in the Indian Ocean tsunami, which killed almost 230,000 people. The rest of the employees and owners of Cleverlance were trying to find the couple, along with their families, after Dosoudil and Beránková were reported missing. Their bodies were found and identified in 2005. The deaths of Dosoudil and Beránková were a huge loss for the company and created a very chaotic situation for the company overall.

=== Later development ===
In 2017, the annual revenue of the company crossed 1 billion Czech crowns. In 2019, KKCG group became the new majority owner.

In June 2023, Cleverlance, Seavus, Komix Digital, Stratiteq, Clearcode, and Musala Soft merged to create Qinshift with 3,000 IT specialists.

== Invinit Group ==
Invinit Group (formerly known as Cleverlance Group) is a family of different IT companies, connected to the founding firm Cleverlance and dealing with many different aspects of information technologies. Apart from Cleverlance Enterprise Solutions, the companies include:

=== AEC ===
AEC is a Czech IT company that was created in 1991 and deals with various facets of cyber security. AEC became a member of Cleverlance Group in 200, through an acquisition agreement between the companies.

=== Eicero ===
Eicero became a member of Cleverlance Group in 2010. The company deals in the complex diagnostics of photovoltaic power stations and the elimination of PID (Potential-induced degradation), which causes lowering of output of a given power station. The main product of Eicero is PID Doctor, a device that regenerates photovoltaic panels that were damaged by PID and restores their performance.

=== TrustPort ===
TrustPort is a provider and developer of computer safety solutions. TrustPort products are based on antivirus and encryption technologies, anti-spam methods and anomaly behavior monitoring AI techniques. TrustPort became a member of the group in March 2008. The company was created as an independent subject within Cleverlance Group after the acquisition of AEC, from which TrustPort became independent.

== IT education ==
Cleverlance periodically holds so-called Academies, in which members of the public can learn about specific IT topics and be granted a certificate after going through this intense crash course. After the course is completed, the best scoring people are offered a job position in Cleverlance. The most often held Academy is the Testing Clever Academy, designed to teach attendees the ins and outs of IT testing within a single week and Testing Java Academy, focused on developers early in their careers. Cleverlance also organizes education academies for the .NET and database technologies.

== Name of the company ==
The name is a combination the words „clever“ and „lance“, which both have connotations of sharpness. The name was thought up by the founding member Jakub Dosoudil, while on vacation in Mexico.
