= The Health Lottery =

British lottery

- Region: Great Britain
- First draw: October 2011
- Operator: Northern and Shell
- Regulated by: Gambling Commission
- Odds of winning jackpot: 1 in 2,118,760
- Number of games: 5
- Website: www.healthlottery.co.uk

The Health Lottery is a lottery that operates on behalf of The Health Lottery Foundation, raising money to support the health and welfare of people throughout Great Britain, including children and young people and those with mental or physical disabilities. It was launched in October 2011 and runs seven weekly draws on Mondays, Tuesdays, Wednesdays, Thursdays, Fridays, Saturdays and Sundays. 20% of ticket sale proceeds go to local health-related causes. It is operated by Northern and Shell.

== History ==
The origins of the Health Lottery predate the National Lottery, to the failed National Health Service Lottery which had an abortive launch in 1988, before being declared illegal. The assets of the NHS Lottery were purchased in 2007 by Altala Group Ltd., a company run by Ian Milligan, a former employee of Camelot Group, the operators of the UK National Lottery. Altala went into administration in 2009, shortly before it was due to be granted its gambling licence, and was purchased by Health Lottery Ltd. After winning the licence, the Health Lottery was sold in February 2011 to Richard Desmond's Northern & Shell group.

The Health Lottery launched in September 2011. Until the summer of 2018, the Health Lottery had operated 51 society lotteries across Great Britain. This structure was formally re-organised in July 2018, to form 12 new larger community interest companies (CICs) covering England, Scotland and Wales. The Health Lottery also re-organised its playing structure to ensure a minimum jackpot of £25,000, and shorten the odds of winning any prize (now 1 in 9.7).

== Game structure ==
The Health Lottery is drawn every day, seven times a week. Participation in the game requires a minimum fee of £1. Winnings range from a free ticket to a jackpot of £100,000.

== Broadcasting ==
First draws for the Health Lottery were broadcast live on the ITV network during an advertisement break of The X Factor, paid for by Northern & Shell; they were quickly moved to Channel 5, which was at the time Northern & Shell's subsidiary. Draws are currently broadcast at around 9:55 pm on Channel 5. It was initially planned to be hosted by Eamonn Holmes but as Holmes was employed by Sky News, he was dropped due to a possible conflict of interest. Melinda Messenger was confirmed as the host on 5 October 2011.

To celebrate the first anniversary of the Health Lottery, a new Wednesday night draw called "Win Wednesday" was launched.

On 5 August 2015, it was announced that the Health Lottery would be extended to five nights a week, with previous National Lottery presenter Anthea Turner taking over as host of the new-look draws from 13 August.

== Controversy ==
The game has been criticised for donating only 20.3% of the ticket price to causes, compared with 28% donated by the National Lottery. Spokespersons for the Health Lottery argue that the game will grow the market. Some attention was also given to the possibility that favourable coverage of the lottery in Desmond's Daily Express and the Daily Star amounted to disguised advertising, which was reported to the Advertising Standards Authority, who found the issue to be outside their remit. The Culture Secretary Jeremy Hunt announced in October 2011 that the Gambling Commission would investigate the legality of the Health Lottery, after questions were raised about the way the lottery was being run and the cost to smaller lotteries nationwide.

Camelot Group attempted to take High Court legal action to have the Health Lottery's gambling licence revoked in 2012, claiming that they had not received adequate protection from the Gambling Commission. Camelot lost the case, a verdict described by Richard Desmond as

“a complete vindication of all the hard work that has gone into launching The Health Lottery…if Camelot had succeeded in this case, they would have shut down lifeline funding to hundreds of health projects and charities. The charity sector would have lost out badly."

== Structure ==
To circumvent the requirements of the Gambling Act, the Health Lottery is not structured as a national lottery, but rather as twelve different society lotteries, each one representing at least one local authority area within England, Scotland and Wales. Each society lottery is licensed by the Gambling Commission and operates as an individual community interest company, or CIC. Different CICs take turns in participating in a weekly draw so each week different CICs are represented and every region gets a share of the pot. Money is then donated to support health-related causes within their respective local areas. The Health Lottery ELM Ltd operates as an external lottery manager to oversee the society lotteries. The ELM charges a management fee of 0.5p in every pound, which provides the profit for the lottery owners. The allocation of funds to causes raised by the Health Lottery is determined by the relevant CICs and their partner charity, the People’s Health Trust, and not by The Health Lottery ELM Ltd. They usually support local charities and grassroots projects.

In 2010 this complicated structure was judged by the Gambling Commission regulatory panel to be "close to the line in respect of section 99 of the [Gambling] Act" and that while the structure was "capable of being compliant with the Act" it was "finely balanced". Concern was expressed that the individual lotteries were not to be combined into one de facto national lottery, as to do so would be a breach of the Act.
