= National Health Service Lottery =

Failed British lottery scheme

The National Health Service Lottery was a failed lottery scheme designed to provide funding for the National Health Service in the United Kingdom. The scheme progressed as far as a trial in May 1988, but the scheme was cancelled at the last minute under threat of legal action, and the 43,000 people who took part in the first draw had their money refunded.

== Background ==
The lottery, which was a national equivalent of earlier localised lotteries in support of hospital services, had a jackpot of £200,000, and progressed as far as the issuing of tickets and a prize draw in May 1988. The scheme was approved by Prime Minister Margaret Thatcher in April 1988, and it was estimated that a single draw could have raised up to £500,000 for the NHS.

== Cancellation ==
Although the National Health Lottery scheme was based upon earlier localised lotteries designed to generate funds for health services, by becoming national in scope, the scheme contravened the Lotteries and Amusements Act 1976. The scheme was referred to the Director of Public Prosecutions by the Gaming Board of Great Britain on 16 May 1988, halting the lottery before the first winner could be announced.

The Attorney-General, Sir Patrick Mayhew reported in the House of Commons in July 1988 that letters were written on 23 and 24 May to the company responsible for running the lottery indicating that the director would request police inquiries if the lottery draw took place.

The issue later appeared at Prime Minister's Questions on 27 October 1988:

Mr. Janner: "Does the Prime Minister recall recently endorsing a lottery intended to benefit the grossly under-resourced National Health Service and then having to remove her endorsement when the lottery turned out to be illegal? Is she proposing to endorse a further lottery launched today for the same purpose, which appears to be illegal under both current and intended legislation?"

Margaret Thatcher: If something is illegal, one cannot possibly endorse it...On that particular private sector lottery, the advice was that as far as could be seen it was legal. When the advice came that it was illegal, of course one did not endorse it. I have not the slightest intention of having a national lottery organised by the Government. I disapprove of them.

== Repercussions ==
Despite the failure of the scheme, the idea for a national lottery in aid of the health service was not dropped and was extensively debated during Parliamentary Questions on 28 July 1988, and on later occasions. It was noted in a 1989 issue of Health Affairs that surveys showed the most popular approach to raising funds for the NHS was "not an increase in progressive income taxes, but rather the launching of a new national lottery (65 percent)". The idea of a "national lottery" in aid of good causes eventually materialised in the form of the National Lottery, launched in 1994.

== See also ==
- The Health Lottery – launched in 2011, structured as regional lotteries which contribute to local health-related causes
