= National Lottery Commission =

- Formation: 1 April 1999; 27 years ago
- Dissolved: 1 October 2013; 12 years ago
- Type: Government agency
- Purpose: Regulation of the National Lottery
- Region served: Great Britain
- Website: www.natlotcomm.gov.uk

The National Lottery Commission was a public body set up on 1 April 1999 under the National Lottery Act 1998 to regulate the United Kingdom's National Lottery. It replaced the Director General and the Office of the National Lottery (Oflot). On 1 October 2013 it was abolished, with its responsibilities being assumed by the Gambling Commission.

The commission was a non-departmental public body sponsored by the Department for Culture, Media and Sport (DCMS) and its costs were reimbursed from the National Lottery Distribution Fund and Olympic Lottery Distribution Fund.

The commission's duties were to ensure that players are treated fairly; the nation's interest in the Lottery is protected; and the operator is motivated to maximise the enjoyment and benefits that the Lottery brings to the Nation. It also ran the competitions in 2001 and 2007 to select the commercial operator of the Lottery, on both occasions choosing Camelot Group plc.

== Structure ==
The Commissioners, of which there were seven, were appointed by the Secretary of State for Culture, Media and Sport. Commissioners met each month to discuss business and make decisions about developments affecting the Lottery. They also appointed the full-time Chief Executive.

The commission was a small organisation of fewer than 50 people. The majority of staff were based in central London with some based at the operator's headquarters in Watford. There were two divisions within the organisation: the Corporate Group, which was led by the Chief Executive, and the Regulatory Operations Group, led by the Deputy Chief Executive.

== Functions ==
=== Protecting players ===
The Commission protected National Lottery players by ensuring that clear information was provided to them; and by setting rules and procedures for each game. If a player was unhappy about any aspect of the National Lottery, they should have raised this with Camelot in the first instance. The Commission then reviewed cases where players were not satisfied by Camelot Group’s response.

They also ensured that there were controls in place to protect against excessive and under-age play.

=== Safeguarding the integrity of the lottery ===
The Commission monitored all aspects of the running of the Lottery, from the televised draws to the way players were paid their prize money, to ensure they were conducted properly and in accordance with the terms of the licence.

=== Maximising proceeds to the good causes ===
The Commission worked to secure the greatest possible returns to good causes by monitoring the performance of the Lottery and ensuring that the allocated funds went to the right place, in the right amounts.

It was not the NLC's responsibility to distribute the good causes funds. There are 14 Lottery distributors who distribute the money to local communities and national projects.

== Licensing competitions ==
The National Lottery is operated by Camelot Group under a licence that was awarded to them by the Commission following a competition to select the operator. The first competition awarded the operating licence for 1994 to 2002, including an interim licence. The second competition awarded the 2002-2009 licence. The commission's competition for the third Lottery licence took place between January 2005 and August 2007: the invitation to apply (ITA) was the formal invitation to bid for the licence and was published on 29 June 2006.

Bids were received from Camelot Group plc and Sugal & Damani UK Ltd. Following an evaluation period, on 7 August 2007 the NLC announced that Camelot Group plc was the preferred bidder to become the operator of the next National Lottery Licence. Camelot's bid was selected as the bid most likely to generate the best returns to good causes over the course of the licence.

The licence came into force on 1 February 2009, to run until 2019, with the option of up to five years' extension.

The Gambling Commission launched the fourth licence competition on 31 August 2020.
