= MND (company) =

Company in the Czech Republic

Moravské naftové doly MND
- Company type: Private
- Industry: petroleum
- Founded: (1913), modern company 2002
- Headquarters: Hodonín, Czech Republic
- Products: oil and gas production, gas storage, gas and electricity retail, energy trading
- Revenue: ▲US$ 250 million (2006)
- Operating income: 283,000,000 Czech koruna (2020)
- Net income: 7,000,000 Czech koruna (2020)
- Total assets: 18,747,000,000 Czech koruna (2020)
- Owner: KKCG
- Number of employees: 746 (2020)
- Website: www.mnd.cz

Moravské naftové doly (MND) is a Czech oil and gas producing company based in Hodonín, Czech Republic, producing 5,000 barrels (790 m^{3}) of oil and 250,000 m^{3} of gas per day. With gas storage facilities of 180 million m^{3}, MND is an important player on European gas market. MND has also a retail and trading unit. KKCG company is the sole shareholder.

The company also operates many assets overseas, for example gas and oil fields in Georgia or gas storages in Germany.

In September 2007, MND signed a contract with Regal Petroleum to buy a 50% stake in a major Ukrainian gas field for US$330 million.

== See also ==
- Energy in the Czech Republic
