= OPAP =

Greek company organizing and conducting games of chance

ΟΠΑΠ – Οργανισμός Προγνωστικών Αγώνων Ποδοσφαίρου Α.Ε. OPAP – Greek Organisation of Football Prognostics S.A.
- Type: Anonymi Etairia
- Traded as: Athex: OPAP
- Industry: Gambling
- Founded: 1958; 68 years ago
- Headquarters: Athens, Greece
- Key people: Kamil Ziegler (Executive Chairman); Jan Karas (CEO)
- Products: Lotteries; Sports betting
- Revenue: €1.129 billion (2020)
- Operating income: €737.26 million (2020)
- Net income: €199.37 million (2020)
- Total assets: €2.320 billion (2020)
- Total equity: €754.88 million (2020)
- Owner: Allwyn AG (48.1%)
- Number of employees: 1976 (2020)
- Website: opap.gr

OPAP – Greek Organisation of Football Prognostics S.A. (Greek: ΟΠΑΠ – Οργανισμός Προγνωστικών Αγώνων Ποδοσφαίρου Α.Ε.) is a Greek company organizing and conducting games of chance. It is headquartered in Athens and for many years OPAP was a state-owned gambling monopoly. The company holds the exclusive rights to organize and manage numerical lotteries and sports betting in Greece. In 2013 the privatization of the company was completed through the sale of the State's remaining 33% stake to the Emma Delta investment scheme.

== History ==
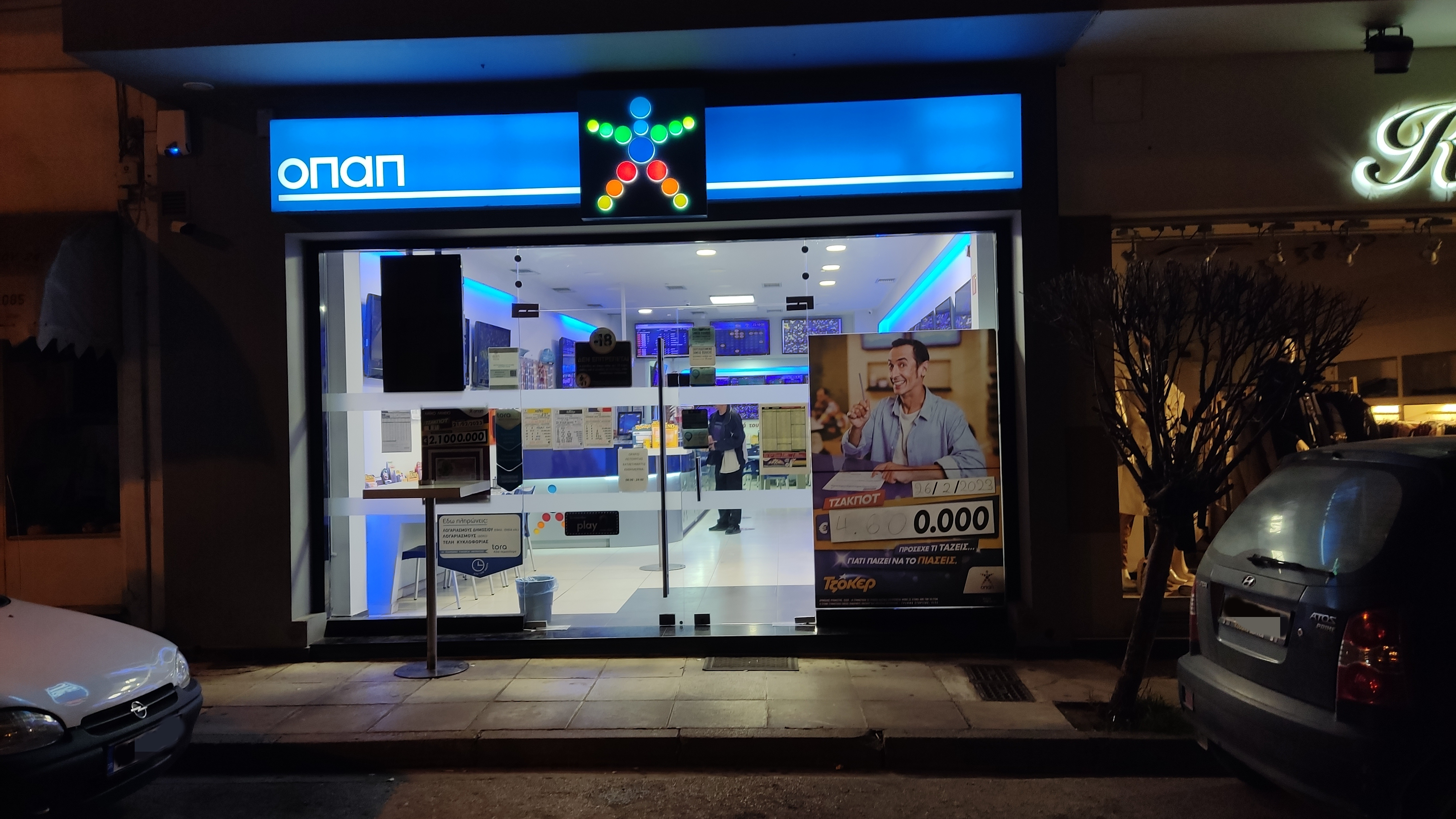
A betting shop managed by Opap in Argos, Greece

In the 1950s, an effort to upgrade Greek sport and improve its infrastructure began. In this framework, the General Secretariat for Sports (Greek: Γ.Γ.Α) was established in 1957. In order to secure funding, the idea to utilize revenue from football prognostics - following the example of other European countries - came to fruition. With this aim, OPAP was established in 1958 as a private legal entity under the umbrella of the General Secretariat for Sport. At the same time of its establishment, a Royal Decree institutionalized the first game OPAP introduced named PRO-PO (the Greek Acronym for Football Prognostics) which was organised along the lines of Italy's Toto Calcio. PRO-PO was launched in March 1959, a few months before the introduction of the Football League First Division and part of its revenues contributed to funding the newly created division. Initially there were no exclusive agencies and games players at partner corner-shops/kiosks, dairies, e.t.c while geographically the game was limited to Athens, Thessaloniki and Piraeus.

=== The early years ===
PRO-PO enjoyed success from the start. This was due, in part, to strong advertising campaigns. In the 1960s the game saw various improvements such as the paying out winnings for slips with 11 correct predictions. OPAP was present in 70 cities and in 1966 it had reached 795 agencies. During this period, it moved its headquarters to Panepistimiou Street, opposite the National Library. In March 1965, OPAP launched its second game, named "6 from 36", an adaptation of a similar German game, the establishment of which was provided in the same royal decree as PRO-PO. There were 36 games on each slip and players had to predict 6 that would result in a draw with the most goals scored. The game was initially met with approval but its slips dropped quickly resulting in the game being stopped in April 1966.

=== Dictatorship era ===
During the military junta period, OPAP experienced impressive growth, helped by the promotion of sport by the dictatorial regime. Agencies shot up to 2,000 from 900 and in 1974 revenues amounted to 1.3 billion drachma, up from 176 million drachma in 1966. The increase in agency profit margins, from 5% to 10%, contributed to this expansion as did the introduction of group systems and the valuable gifts that were drawn (cars, trips etc.) since 1965.

=== Political changeover ===
After the end of the dictatorship, the impressive growth of OPAP continued. In 1981 agencies amounted to 2,952 and revenue stood at 7.3 billion drachma. At the same time, the management of its sponsorship became more transparent and was subject to parliamentary scrutiny. OPAP funds contributed to the creation of hundreds of stadiums, closed gymnasiums and other sporting cites throughout the country, while its sponsorship were no longer limited to sport but extended to culture too. At the end of the decade, agencies had reached 4,000 in number and two more games were introduced, LOTTO and PROTO, the conduct of which led to the significant upgrading of the Organization's computerization.

=== Listing in the stock exchange ===
LOTTO and TZOKER was launched in 1990 and PROTO in 1992; and followed by PROPOGOAL in 1996. Besides, 2000 was an important year in OPAP's history as Pame Stoixima, the first legal sports betting game, was launched in Greece. This game would quickly turn into OPAP's most profitable product. In 1999, OPAP turned into a Societe Anonyme, under the name OPAP S.A. and the duration of this legal entity form was set at 100 years. In 2001 OPAP got listed in the Athens Stock Exchange through a law, according to which, the State could dispense up to 49% of the company's share capital to investors. Initially 5% of the total stock was dispense and the State proceeded with more stock pack sakes in 2002, 2003 and 2005, with its stake being reduced at 33,6%. In 2003, following a bilateral agreement between the Greek State and the Republic of Cyprus, OPAP S.A. established OPAP Cyprus Ltd, which is primary responsible for the organization, conduct and marketing of the company's games in Cyprus.

=== Change in ownership ===
On 11 October 2013, the State sold its remaining stake in the organization (33% of the share capital) to a private equity fund Emma Delta which paid 622 million EUR to the former major shareholder, Hellenic Republic Asset Development Fund (HRADF), for the acquisition of this stake.

== Hellenic Lotteries ==
In July 2013, the HRADF and Hellenic Lotteries S.A. signed a concession agreement for the exclusive right to operate the Hellenic Republic's State Lotteries for a period of 12 years. Hellenic Lotteries S.A. is a consortium of OPAP Investment Limited (67%), Intralot Lotteries Limited (16.5%) and Scientific Games (16.5%). The total value of the financial consideration for the Hellenic Republic included the upfront fee of 190 million euros in cash and a guaranteed minimum income of 580 million euros (over a 12-year period).

== Horse Races S.A. ==
In November 2015, OPAP subsidiary, Horse Races S.A. acquired the 20-year horse-race betting licence from HRADF, at the price of 40 million euros. Betting on horse racing in Greece had been run by state-owned group ODIE. The first Greek races organised by OPAP subsidiary Horse Races S.A. were held in the town of Markopoulo Attica, on Friday 22 January 2016. On 26 November 2016, PMU and Hellas Horse Races S.A. announced the launch of a partnership to make common pool betting on French races available to Greek punters. Horse Races S.A. also provides betting on British and South African horse racing.

== OPAP's games ==
OPAP runs the following games:

- PRO-PO (Since 1 March 1959)
- 6 out of 36 (Launched on 28 March 1965, discontinued a year later)
- LOTTO (Since 5 December 1990)
- TZOKER (Since 6 December 1990)
- PROTO (Since 10 June 1992)
- PROPOGOAL (Since 3 March 1996)
- PAME STOIXIMA (Since 20 January 2000; In 2014 the company's digital sports betting platform was launched allowing players to bet online in Pame Stoixima and participate in the live betting games offered)
- SUPER 3 (Since 25 November 2002)
- EXTRA 5 (Since 25 November 2002)
- KINO (Since 4 October 2004)
- PAME STOIXIMA VIRTUAL SPORTS (Since 18 May 2017)
- POWERSPIN (Since 30 June 2020)
- In April 2015 the company launched opapp, its first application for smartphones

== The first PRO-PO slip ==
The first PRO-PO slip was launched on 1 March 1959 and included 12 matches, as well as two substitutes, the results of which would be effective, only in case of postponement or cancellation of one or more of the 12 matches. Matches were chosen from the final round of the Hellenic Championship of 1959, the second division of the Athens Union of Football Clubs, the Piraeus Union of Football Clubs and the Macedonia Union of Football Clubs, as well as from the Italian championship. 213,670 columns were completed and there was only one winner who managed to achieve 12 correct forecasts. This was Nikos Passaris, a resident of Athens, who won 228,360 Drachmas, an exceptionally high amount for that time. There were also 48 players with 11 correct forecasts, who shared the amount of 6,750.50 Drachmas.

== Sponsorships ==
- Greece national football team
- Hellenic Football Federation
- Greece men's national basketball team
- Hellenic Basketball Federation
- OPAP Arena - Agia Sophia Stadium
- AEK Athens FC
- Panathinaikos B.C.
- Panathinaikos A.O.
- Hellenic Athletics Federation

=== Athletes ===
- Georgia Despollari
- Apostolos Christou
- Despina Georgiadou
- Panagiota Dosi
- Semeli Zarmakoupi
- Michalis Anastasakis
- Evangelia Anastasiadou
- Nikos Papangelis
- Korina Politi
- Konstantinos Englezakis
- Eva Nikou
- Milena Kondou
- Nikos Papadimitriou

== Subsidiaries ==
OPAP has five subsidiaries: OPAP Cyprus Ltd, that operates lottery agencies in Cyprus; OPAP SPORTS Ltd (f/k/a OPAP Glory and Glory Sports Betting) that operates sports betting agencies in Cyprus; OPAP International Ltd, OPAP Investment Ltd and OPAP Services S.A.

== Criticism ==
- February 2017, OPAP offered a new contract for its agents alongside the 2020 vision presentation. The new contract lowers commissions as they are determined by a fixed percentage of the Net Gaming Revenue(39% for 2017, 37% for 2018, 35% for 2019 and 2020). That commission is then adapted in each quarter depending on customers winnings. If customers win more than anticipated within a quarter part of the agents commission has to be returned.
- March 2017, agents were on strike.
- March 2017, OPAP 9 agents disagreed with the new contract OPAP offered alongside the 2020 vision. Within a month they initiated Judicial review to the supreme court concerning the unconstitutionally of the new contract. OPAP management team has seen that move as a threat to its monopoly and terminated cooperation with those 9 agents.
- March 2018, OPAP terminated cooperation with 600 agents because they did not sign the new contract OPAP offered. That while the case for the new contract is still open at the supreme court. All those agents had signed the old contract which OPAP terminated.
- The process of cooperation termination with its 600 agents involves removal of all OPAP supplied equipment. During this process an elderly father of an agent passed away the same day the equipment was removed.

== Controversy ==
=== Involvement in Stanleybet shutdown ===
In November 2008, the government of Greece shut down the Greek operations of Liverpool-based Stanleybet International, a European gambling company. Stanleybet had recently opened two offices in Greece and was to be a major competitor to OPAP. The government acted on OPAP's public complaints and raided Stanleybet offices on 7 November 2008, confiscating their assets.

One of the complaints expressed by protests during the 2008 Greek riots was the government's fast action in acting on behalf of OPAP to remove competition, whereas for issues affecting public safety or the rights of the people the government has been popularly thought to be slow-acting.

=== European Court of Justice ruling ===
In 2011, Stanleybet and two other UK-based companies, William Hill and Sportingbet, brought a legal action before the Symvoulio tis Epikrateias (Council of State) after their applications to OPAP for permission to provide sport betting services in Greece were rejected. The Council of State referred the matter to the European Court of Justice for a preliminary ruling in relation to the freedom of establishment and freedom to provide services which are fundamental to EU law. The preliminary ruling confirmed that the Greek legislation which granted a gambling monopoly to OPAP was incompatible with EU law.
