= Microsoft Project Server =

Project management server software made by Microsoft

Project Web App (PWA) initial screen

A schedule shown in PWA Project Center

Microsoft Office Project Server is a project management server software made by Microsoft since 2000. It uses Microsoft SharePoint as its foundation, and supports interface from either Microsoft Project (Professional edition) as a client application or by web browser connecting to its Project Web App (PWA) component.

== Overview ==
As an extension of Microsoft Project, Project Server provides the Project Web App (PWA, formerly Project Web Access). Microsoft Project Server stores project information in a central SQL Server database, protected from unauthorized access and corruption. A Project Administrator can control security defining users and access rights.

The Project Center supports reports across an organization at the project level. Managers can drill down into project details. Tasks, Projects and Resources can have Enterprise Custom Fields defined (similar to Custom Fields in the Microsoft Project desktop application).

The project manager needs to communicate project plans and to distribute task assignments to team members. The assignment of tasks can be distributed to team member home pages in PWA. They need to communicate status and changes to keep the project manager up to date. Project Server supports electronic communication over the web via PWA. Team members can update their tasks' status via PWA and the My Tasks list or via a Time Sheet.

Resource workloads can be analyzed by project and by resource with the Resource Center, allowing organizations to forecast future resource requirements and make more efficient use of resources. Project Server also includes a resource planning module that facilitates macro-level planning of resources to projects.

The view definition is easier to understand and more robust with PWA than with Microsoft Project. Views can be protected to assist standardization. Project Server stores custom calendars, views, tables, filters, and fields, in an Enterprise Global area where users have access to the latest version every time they restart Microsoft Project.

For each published project in Microsoft Project a Project Workspace can be created. A Project Workspace is a custom Microsoft SharePoint Teamsite (built for Project Server) where the Project team can share a web version of the project schedule as well as documents, issues, risks and a list of the project deliverables.

== History ==
Versions for Windows include:

- 2000 – Project Central
- 2002 – Project Server 2002
- 2003 – Office Project Server 2003
- 2007 – Office Project Server 2007
- 2010 – Project Server 2010
- 2013 – Project Server 2013
- 2013 - Project Online (cloud Version)
- 2016 - Project Server 2016 / Project Online
- 2019 - Project Server 2019
- 2022 - Project Server Subscription Edition

=== 2007 ===
The architecture of Project Server 2007 contains significant changes.

The 2003 Microsoft Project version employed ODBC to connect to the server, which is problematic over low bandwidth and high latency connections. This problem is often skirted by remotely using a PC with the same network (LAN) as the server.

The 2007 version uses SOAP to access the server. Although this facilitates clients over low bandwidth / high latency connections, it adds a level of complexity (in the form of a Queue) that must be managed by an administrator. Specifically, a job in the queue could get stuck and block other jobs from completion. The advantage of the queue is that MS Project uses a local cache, enabling the user to continue to work on his project plan even when he is not connected to the server.

The 2007 version has 14 OLAP cubes which can be used to do Data Analysis with. It is an improvement over the 2003 version which only had 1 OLAP cube. With the new cube Calculated measures can be added to the cubes, which enables reporting on custom created fields.

Project Server 2007 features a local cache which effectively allows the user to have 2 copies of a Project Schedule. Changes made after the first save will just be synchronized rather than replacing the server copy which speeds up response times. But currently there are known cache issues.

=== 2010 ===
Microsoft Project 2010 adds ribbons to its user interface. Ribbons are available in other Office products, such as Microsoft Project and PWA. Other features include Project Portfolio Server, the inclusion of a "Timeline" view, which graphically represents key tasks and milestones. Another view that helps with resource management is the Team Planner, which provides a graphical view of assignments of tasks to resources. The Team Planner also shows unscheduled and unassigned tasks.

This version brought about two name changes: The word "Office" was dropped from the name of both Microsoft Project and Project Server. In addition, "Project Web Access" was renamed to "Project Web App".

=== 2013 ===
Significant changes with the 2013 version increase what browser access can do and simplify usage:

- Based on SharePoint 2013, Project Web App (PWA) gets a Modern UI look. The menu area indented outline list becomes a simpler 1-level list and the display area text list becomes a carousel of rectangular icons.
- Architecture of four Databases becomes one Database with 4 schemas. The change of separate storage areas (Draft, Published, Reporting, and Archived) to being one with flag setting is to lessen the amount of DB admin needed and now allows web access not limited to Published, i.e. can work baselining functions.
- Direct reporting feeds to URLs and Office. Without going through a Project interface at all, reports are made available directly to a URL instead of needing to develop REST feeds, and reports are also directly readable oData by Office products. (e.g. Excel 2013 can do File | FromOtherSource | From oData feed).
- SysAdmins and Team Members no longer go through Project. It now provides a simple view for basic project data and management of user access in SharePoint groups, which were previously reached by navigating through the PWA interface.

Project Server 2013 and Microsoft Project 2013 are not backward-compatible with other versions of Project Server. Project Server 2013 only supports Microsoft Project Pro 2013; and Microsoft Project Pro 2013 only connects to Project Server 2013.

=== 2016 ===
The Project Server 2016 release looks largely similar to the 2013 version, but

- Expands functions at resource management, into resource engagements with heat map displays
- Adds capacity to bring transparency to the interaction between project planning and line planning.
- Removes the Resource Plan from the PWA interface as Microsoft Project 2016 expanded to include this function.
- Microsoft also released a content pack for Power BI Dashboards which integrates with its cloud-based Project Online offering.
