= List of Czechs by net worth =

The following Forbes list of Czech billionaires is based on an annual assessment of wealth and assets compiled and published by Forbes magazine in 2026.

== 2026 Czech billionaires list ==
| Global ranking | Name | Citizenship | Net worth (USD) | Sources of wealth |
|---|---|---|---|---|
| 68 | Michal Strnad | Czech Republic | 31.1 billion | Czechoslovak Group |
| 131 | Renáta Kellnerová | Czech Republic | 20.2 billion | PPF Group |
| 316 | Karel Komárek | Czech Republic | 10.3 billion | KKCG |
| 323 | Daniel Křetínský | Czech Republic | 10.2 billion | EPH |
| 383 | Pavel Tykač | Czech Republic | 9.1 billion | Sev.en Energy AG |
| 542 | Radovan Vítek | Czech Republic | 7.2 billion | CPI Property Group |
| 934 | Andrej Babiš | Czech Republic | 4.6 billion | Agrofert |
| 1834 | Pavel Baudiš | Czech Republic | 2.3 billion | Avast |
| 1834 | Aleš Zavoral | Czech Republic | 2.3 billion | Alza.cz |
| 1913 | Marek Dospiva | Czech Republic | 2.2 billion | Penta Investments |
| 2600 | Eduard Kučera | Czech Republic | 1.5 billion | Avast |
| 2858 | René Holeček | Czech Republic | 1.3 billion | Colt CZ Group |

== See also ==
- List of billionaires
- List of wealthiest families
