= SCTbio =

Czech biotechnology company

SCT Cell Manufacturing s.r.o.
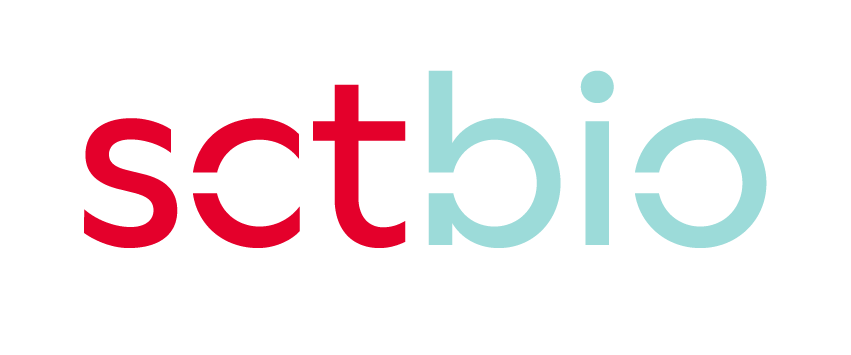
- Industry: Biotechnology, Pharmaceutical
- Founded: 2021; 5 years ago
- Founder: PPF Group
- Headquarters: Prague, Czech Republic
- Key people: Luděk Sojka (CEO)
- Revenue: 231,110,000 Czech koruna (2020)
- Operating income: −2,299,588,000 Czech koruna (2020)
- Net income: −2,360,838,000 Czech koruna (2020)
- Total assets: 7,736,322,000 Czech koruna (2020)
- Number of employees: 280 (2020)
- Website: www.sctbio.com

SCTbio (legally: SCT Cell Manufacturing s.r.o.) is a Czech biotechnology company that provides contract development and manufacturing (CDMO) services for Advanced Therapy Medicinal Products (ATMPs), including cell and gene therapy products.

Operating in Europe and North America, the company specializes in developing autologous cell-based products, cell banking, and all needle-to-needle good manufacturing practice (GMP) operations. These vary from a validated network of apheresis collection sites to product manufacturing, quality control, GMP storage, Qualified Person (QP), and Quality Assurance (QA) release. SCTbio offers worldwide distribution of drug products for both clinical and commercial sales.

== History ==
SCTbio was initially established as part of the Sotio group to focus on cell and gene therapy manufacturing. SCTbio's CEO, Luděk Sojka, has been part of the PPF Biotech network and Sotio since 2011.

On November 1, 2021, Sotio a.s. changed its name to SCTbio a.s.

== Operations ==
SCTbio conducts global operations in Europe and the USA. The cGMP cell manufacturing facility is based in Prague, Czech Republic. The GMP facility features over 2,000 square meters of total space, including a total clean room area of 420m² (4,520 sq ft). The company offers the ability to manufacture genetically modified products that require the separation of viral and non-viral components. This physical segregation minimizes any risk of cross-contamination.
