= Anna Kellnerová =

Czech equestrian (born 1996)

- Born: 26 November 1996 (age 29); Prague, Czech Republic
- Parent(s): Petr Kellner; Renáta Kellnerová

Anna Kellnerová (born 26 November 1996) is a Czech show jumping rider and businesswoman. She represented the Czech Republic at the 2020 Summer Olympics in Tokyo and has won multiple Czech junior and young rider championships. She is also a shareholder of PPF Group and has served on its supervisory board since 2026.

== Equestrian career ==
Kellnerová obtained her competition licence at the age of 12 and began competing in 2009. She won the Czech junior team championship in 2012 with Zonny and the individual junior championship in 2013 with Curley Sue. Riding Bacara de la Ferme Blanche, she subsequently won the Czech championship in the young riders category in 2014 and 2015.

Kellnerová represented the Czech Republic at European junior and young rider championships. Riding Kashmir, she finished 31st at the 2014 European Junior Championships in Arezzo, narrowly missing qualification for the individual final. She later competed at the European Young Riders Championships, finishing 51st with Classic at the 2016 championship in Millstreet, Ireland.

From 2015 to 2021, Kellnerová was coached by former Irish Olympic show jumper Jessica Kürten, a partnership that spanned her progression from young-rider competition to her Olympic debut.

=== International career and Olympics ===
In 2017, Kellnerová joined the Berlin Lions in the Global Champions League, alongside fellow Czech rider Aleš Opatrný. Riding Classic, she helped the team finish third at the London round, its first podium finish of the season. The team became the Prague Lions for the 2018 season. In April 2018, Kellnerová and Gerco Schröder won the Miami Beach round of the Global Champions League for the team.

In May 2019, Kellnerová fractured her femur in a fall with Catch Me If You Can during a Global Champions League event in Madrid. The injury kept her out of competition for several months and disrupted her Olympic qualification campaign. She returned to international competition and, in August 2020, fulfilled the minimum eligibility requirements for the Olympic Games with Catch Me If You Can at the Nations Cup in Prague.

Kellnerová represented the Czech Republic in both the individual and team jumping competitions at the 2020 Summer Olympics in Tokyo. Riding Catch Me If You Can, she finished 55th in the individual qualifier, while the Czech team placed 14th in the team qualifier.

Since 2021, Kellnerová has also served as manager of the Prague Lions while continuing to compete internationally for the team in the Global Champions League. The Prague Lions had their most successful season to that point in 2022, winning three Global Champions League rounds and finishing third in the overall standings. Kellnerová rode Catch Me If You Can at the Prague Playoffs, where the team reached the Super Cup final for the first time and finished sixth.

Under Kellnerová's management, the Prague Lions reached the Super Cup final again in 2023 and 2024, finishing fourth on both occasions. In 2023, Kellnerová and Belgian teammate Pieter Devos finished second in the Miami round of the Global Champions League.

=== Catch Me If You Can ===
Catch Me If You Can Old is a bay Oldenburg mare born in 2008, sired by Catoki out of Agentin, whose damsire was Acordplus. Before joining Kellnerová, the mare competed internationally with German rider Laura Klaphake. The pair competed at the 2017 European Show Jumping Championships in Gothenburg and were members of the German team that won the Nations Cup at CHIO Aachen in 2018. Later that year, they won the team bronze medal at the 2018 FEI World Equestrian Games in Tryon, where they also finished 14th individually.

Catch Me If You Can was transferred to Kellnerová at the end of 2018. The mare subsequently became Kellnerová's principal championship horse. They represented the Czech Republic at the 2020 Summer Olympics in Tokyo and continued competing together at five-star level, including in the Global Champions League. Catch Me If You Can was retired from competition at the end of 2024, after six years with Kellnerová.

== Business activities ==
Kellnerová is a shareholder of PPF Group, the investment group founded by her father, Petr Kellner. In 2026, she joined the group's supervisory board following the relocation of PPF's holding structure from the Netherlands to the Czech Republic.

== Personal life ==
Kellnerová was in a relationship with Czech businessman Daniel Křetínský from 2017 to 2023.
