= Hotel Praha =

Hotel in Prague, Czech Republic

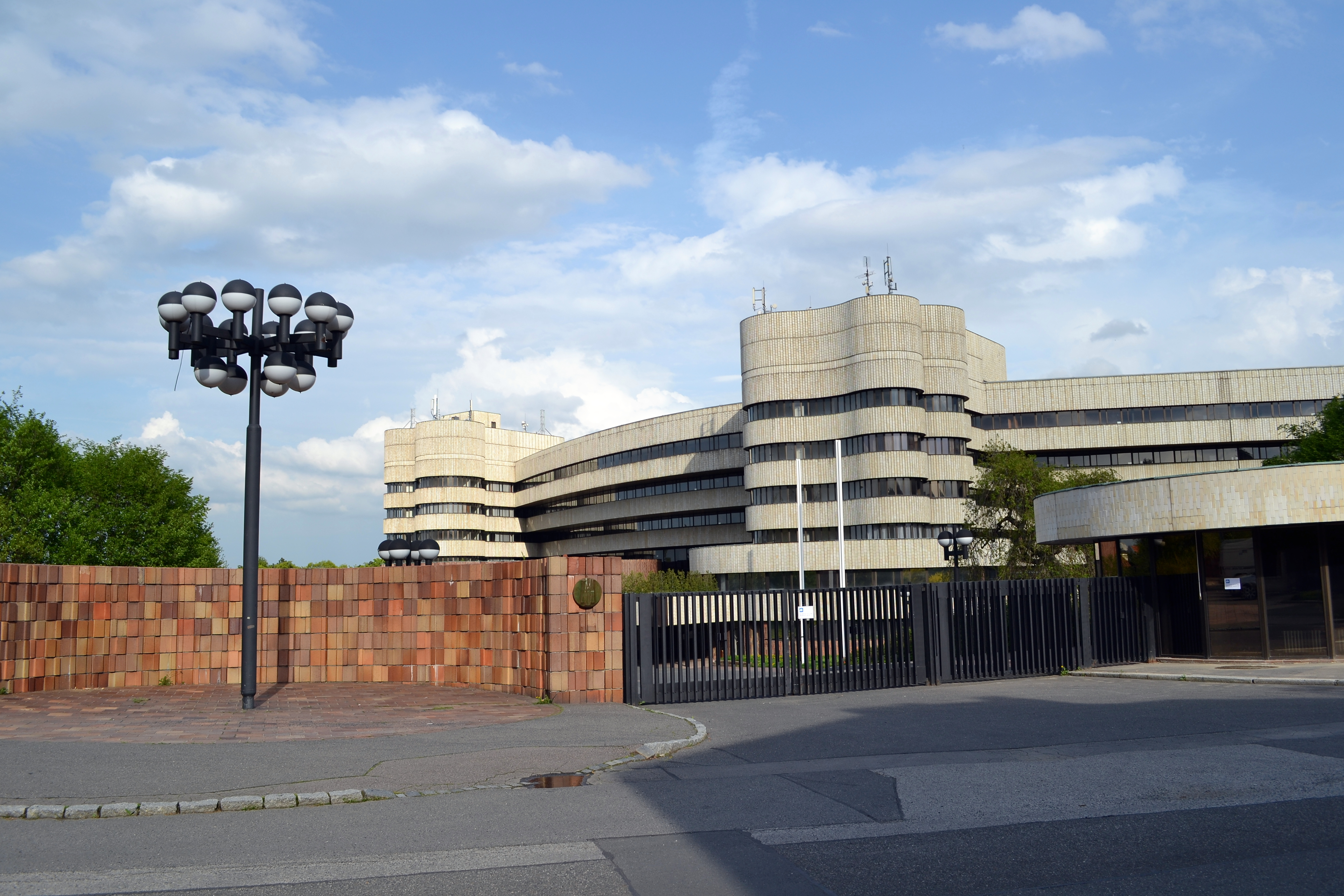

General information
- Location: Prague-Dejvice, Czech Republic
- Coordinates: 50°6′10.96″N 14°22′37.63″E
- Opened: 1981
- Closed: January 2013
- Demolished: 2014

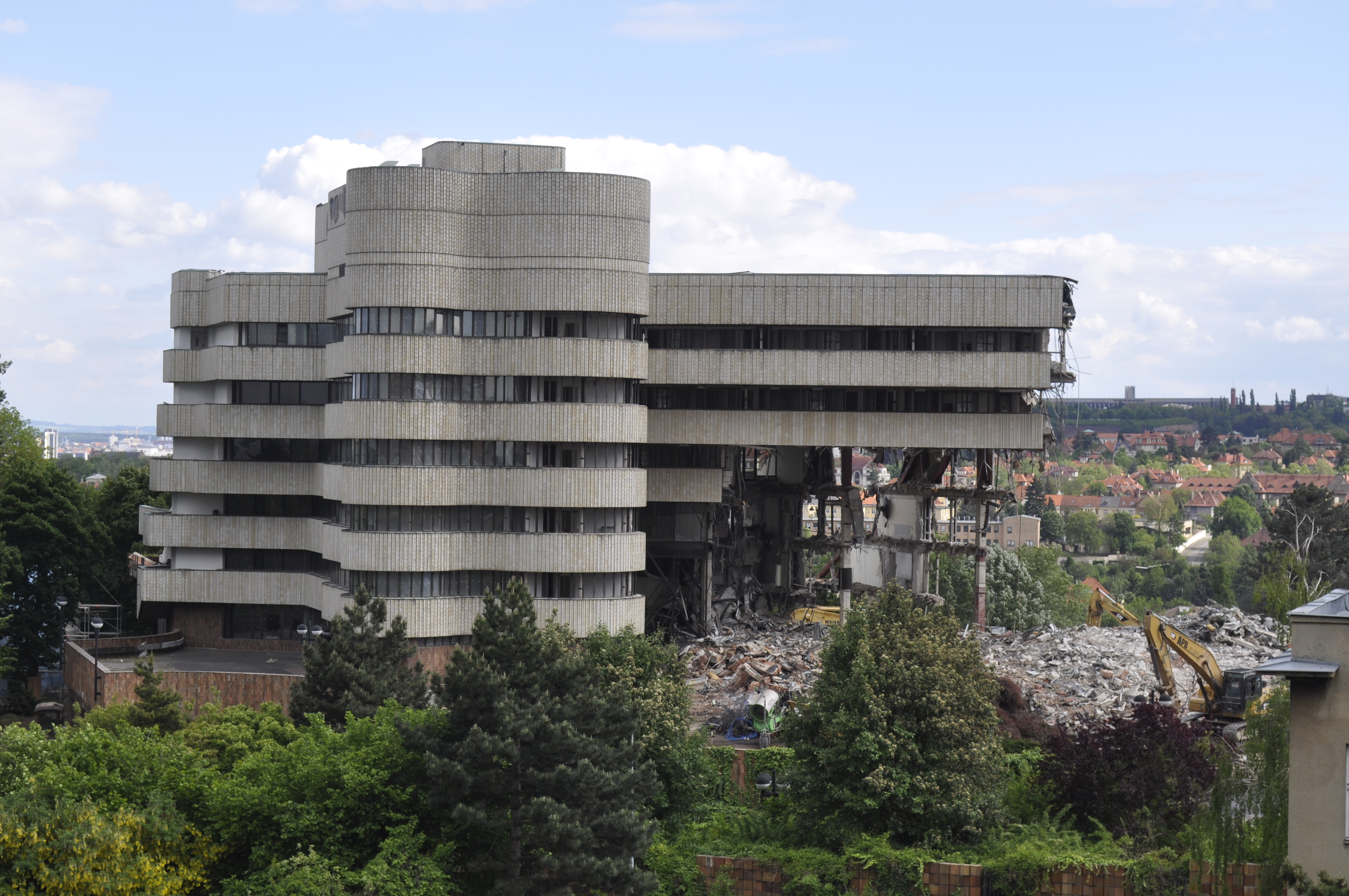
The hotel being in the process of demolition in 2014

Hotel Praha was a luxury hotel located in the Dejvice neighborhood of Prague, Czech Republic. Built in 1981, the hotel was used by the Communist Party of Czechoslovakia, mostly officials and their guests, until 1989, when it opened to the public. It was demolished in 2014 after being purchased by billionaire Petr Kellner.

== History ==
Hotel Praha was built over a six-year period between 1975 and 1981. An example of postmodern and brutalist architecture, it was designed by architects Jaroslav Paroubek, Arnošt Navrátil, Radek Černý, and Jan Sedláček. The hotel featured 136 guest rooms, all of which had views of Prague Castle; as well as a swimming pool with ceramic tiles, a winter garden, a movie theater, and a bowling alley. The lobby of the hotel had a distinctive grand circular staircase.

During Communist rule of Czechoslovakia, the hotel played host to senior Communist Party officials, and also served as a venue for them to welcome high-ranking foreign dignitaries, including Leonid Brezhnev, Yasser Arafat and Muammar Gaddafi. After the fall of the Iron Curtain in 1989, it was opened to the general public and classified as a five-star hotel.

Tom Cruise stayed in the hotel during the filming of Mission: Impossible. It was also used by the Czech national football team until 2007, when its players was found to have partied there with prostitutes after a victory. The team was made to pay a million Czech koruna in disciplinary fines.

== Demolition ==
In 2013, Hotel Praha was acquired by billionaire Petr Kellner, founder and majority shareholder of the PPF Group. He decided to demolish the hotel in order to build a campus of Open Gate, a private school he had founded, on the land. The previous owners of the hotel had considered it unprofitable due to high costs of maintenance. The decision to demolish was controversial and met with protests, as some Prague residents considered it a historical and architectural landmark worth preserving. Attempts to make the hotel a protected heritage site were unsuccessful.

The demolition of Hotel Praha was completed in June 2014. Kellner's school was never built, and he died in a helicopter crash in 2021.
