= Pavel Tykač =

Czech billionaire and entrepreneur

- Born: 15 May 1964 (age 62); Čelákovice, Czechoslovakia
- Education: Czech Technical University in Prague
- Occupation: Businessman
- Spouse(s): Daniela Kuchtová (divorced); Ivana Tykačová
- Children: 4

Pavel Tykač (born 15 May 1964) is a Czech billionaire businessman, and the sole owner of Sev.en Energy Group, a major player in the Czech energy market that is expanding globally. His wealth was estimated at US$8.9 billion in May 2026, according to Forbes, and the fourth richest person in the Czech Republic. He and his wife are engaged in charity projects and support for the North Bohemian Region and the Pardubice Region.

Tykač started his business career after the Revolution by sale of computer technology. In the beginning of the 90s he and his partners established Vikomt company which had a great break through on the market. He sold his share of the company in the middle of the 90s. He used the acquired money to buy at the time small Regiobanka in Karlovy Vary (today's Hypoteční banka); he subsequently sold it to IPB at a very advantageous price. Already at that time he was considered to be a very rich man. In 1995 he participated in the creation of free community of investors around Motoinvest whose participants gained shares in several banks and investment funds thanks to buying cheap shares after the privatization. Forced termination of their activities has led to the rapid sale of assets of the majority of participants in this community. At the turn of the millennium, after several years in seclusion, Tykač returned to the world of big business. Share trades (mainly electricity company ČEZ and Telefónica) and currency rate movement speculations are probably the biggest source of Tykač's billion-dollar assets.

In 2006, he entered the energy sector by investing in a minority stake in the Czech Coal mining group. In 2010, he became its sole owner. During that period, Tykač significantly developed the company in the energy sector and, primarily, invested in the know-how in assets and energy market. In 2013, he bought the Chvaletice Power Station, creating a new entity in the domestic energy market. In 2017, he completed a commercially successful period with several major contracts, rebranding Czech Coal to Sev.en Group. In 2018, he decided to enter the European energy market through the emerging Sev.en Energy (SE) holding, which relies on renowned experts. The new company will focus on investing in innovative technologies in energy, as well as in operating and innovating conventional resources that will enable European energy systems to switch to renewable resources in the long run.

== Early life ==
Tykač was born on 15 May 1964 in Čelákovice. He studied at the Czech Technical University in Prague where he obtained an engineer's degree in 1987.

== Career ==
After completing military service, he worked as a technician in the TOS Čelákovice. In 1990 he started to import and sell computer equipment, and later, in 1991, he founded Vikomt company with three other partners, which became one of the top three companies on the market in the first half of the nineties

In 1995 he sold his share and used the money (up to one billion dollars) to take over a small Regiobanka in Hradec Kralove, which he subsequently sold to IPB. IPB transformed it into Czechomoravian mortgage bank. The proceeds from this transaction were the source for his further activities.

Tykač gained a significant portion of his assets while trading with shares of the coupon privatization in the nineties. He participated in the creation of a free group of people and companies around Motoinvest (brokerage house) which the media later called "the Motoinvest group". The group shared common vision of the emergence of strong Czech financial and industrial group. Individual members of this group were massively buying shares from small shareholders during the privatization. Thanks to these activities the group gained shares in a number of large investment funds (e.g. funds managed by Komerční banka, ČSOB, Živnobanka, CS Funds, Creditanstalt or PPF), several banks (Credit banka Plzeň, Agrobanka) and many other major companies (e.g. Slovácké Machinery, Gravel and sand pits of Olomouc, ...).

Motoinvest Group also acquired significant stakes in several Czech banks (Kreditní banka Plzeň, Bank of Plzeň, Agrobanka).

Credit Bank Plzeň was a medium-sized Plzeň region bank, founded in 1991. Motoinvest owned around 15 percent since 1994, while the large majority was owned by Czech Insurance. In 1995 it had a balance sheet total worth over 12 billion CZK. When the bank collapsed in autumn 1996, it was suspected that Motoinvest had played a role in this and two of its representatives were charged with criminal offences. Additionally, a House of Commons committee of inquiry was assigned to investigate the circumstances of the bank's collapse. Its conclusions were unequivocal: it was a combination of a large number of low-quality loans (between 1991 and 1993), management inexperience, high operating costs and poor performance of the central bank's banking supervision. The bank's appointed liquidator confirmed the same reasons for its failure and the court subsequently freed the accused Motoinvest representatives (Jan Dienstl and David Knop-Kostka).

The Bank of Plzeň was controlled by Motoinvest. It was a small financial institution with a balance sheet of approximately 2.5 billion CZK, which scarcely provided loans or kept accounts for individuals. The bank acted as an investment intermediary. In the fall of 1995, it played a central role in the legendary Motoinvest Group event, which, with the help of a massive "small shareholders cry foul" advertising campaign, bought shares from voucher privatization. In 1996 it acquired Agrobanka, which ended up controlling 100 percent of the shares. The bank operated until 2003, when it lost a court case for errors made in its role as a CS Funds depository and filed for bankruptcy in March 2003, subsequently going into liquidation.

The most valuable acquisition of the Motoinvest Group (in which Tykač played a central role) was a major share in Agrobanka. At the end of 1995, Agrobanka was the fifth largest bank in the country, with a balance sheet of more than 70 billion CZK. It played a crucial role in Tykač's plans, namely to become the key player of a new and emerging financial and industrial group. Tykač agreed on this strategy with a few other Agrobanka shareholders, and together they owned a comfortable majority. Agrobanka's new strategy was confirmed in the General Meeting, during which Pavel Janda was elected as the new CEO and Chairman of the Board of Directors, soon to become the Deputy Director, at the beginning of 1996.

In autumn 1996, after the purchase of a significant share in the then state-majority-owned Česká spořitelna and an attempt to gain influence and position among its authorities a hard clash between "group Motoinvest" on one side and the ČNB together with the then largest banks (Czech Savings Bank, Commercial Bank, ČSOB) on the other started blazing. The result was a forced administration of Agrobanka by ČNB. This forced investors around Motoinvest to a rapid sale of their assets; it caused their forced departure from the Czech capital market and extinction of the group.

At the beginning of the new millennium, after several years in seclusion, Tykač started to invest into equities on the Prague Stock Exchange and speculative trading in foreign currencies. He was trading with shares of Telefónica or Czech Radiokomunikace, but his best-known business has been a massive purchase of ČEZ shares at a time, when one share cost less than 100 CZK. Within a few years he was able to sell the same share for more than 1000 CZK. He was sure that ČEZ fusion with various regional distributors into "SuperČEZ" will result into a significant increase in the value of the investments in a relatively short time. According to some sources, he earned up to ten billion CZK solely on this transaction.

In 2002 he was involved in securing funding for the company EC Group, which won the tender for the purchase of receivables from the Czech Consolidation Agency in the nominal amount of 38 billion CZK. Czech Consolidation Agency (CKA) has been called the "bad bank" of the state, into which the problem loans from the privatization of large banks after debt relief were redirected. EC Group, which was then owned by former collaborators of Pavel Tykač Jan Dienstl and Pavel Šimek paid 3.4 billion CZK for a package of receivables.^{.} The group overpaid such renowned consortiums as Goldman Sachs / Flow East or PPF / CS First Boston, by about half a billion CZK. In 2003, the EC Group sued ČKA and demanded the return of about 570 mil CZK against portions of the claims that ČKA never owned due to legal shortcomings and therefore the claims could not even be sold. ČKA eventually returned about 440 mil CZK based on a judicial verdict.^{.}

In 2006 Tykač invested via a Cyprus company Indoverse Investment Limited into a minority share in one of the leading mining and energy groups in the Czech Republic Czech Coal. At the end of 2010 Indoverse Investment Limited became the sole 100% owner of the Czech Coal group.

In the summer of 2013 Litvínovská uhelná a. s., which operates a ČSA mine and Chvaletice power plant purchased from the ČEZ group, separated from the Czech Coal group. This business move created a new group on the market called Severní energetická, in which Tykač owns a 40% share.

In 2018, Tykač acquired and merged the two companies, creating a new brand, the Northern Energy Group. The restructuring was completed through the creation of Sev.en Energy AG, the second largest power company in the Czech Republic, owner of the Vršany and ČSA coal mines, the Chvaletice and Počerady power plants and the Kladno and Zlín heating plants. At that time, Sev.en Energy AG also began expanding into foreign energy markets, taking over power plants in Great Britain and Australia.

Apart from his holding in Severní energetická, Tykač also operates on the real estate and financial markets.

In October 2024, Tykač announced his financial support of Václav Klaus Institute, after Petr Kellner's PPF Group support ended.

== Tykač and the CS Funds ==
His earlier activities on the financial market in the 1990s included the acquisition of CS Fund, the asset manager of three smaller investment funds, which Tykač divested himself of just a few weeks before it was ‘tunneled’ or defrauded in March 1997. Austel became the new funds owner but immediately sold the CS Funds to Crassus GmbH, a brokerage company. Subsequently, Crassus GmbH immediately sold the CS Funds to Kos-Mos, a Russian company based in Moscow.

Almost 1,3 bil CZK was fraudulently withdrawn from the funds in 1997. Four offenders were convicted in 2001 (legally effective in 2007.) These were managers of Umana, a brokerage company that cooperated with the new CS Funds owner, Russian company Kos-Mos. In 2006 prosecution of Tykač and another five people started. The prosecution of Tykač and other three suspects was terminated after a review by the Supreme Public Prosecutor's Office in 2008 with the conclusion that the conduct of these persons in connection with CS Funds had not been a criminal offense. The remaining two suspects were indicted in the same year, but were subsequently freed by the Municipal Court in Prague in 2012.

Tykač's involvement in the money withdrawal from the CS Funds became a subject of criminal prosecution again in 2013, when criminal proceedings against him were resumed. New facts that led to the restoration of the process were represented by a particularly dubious testimony of people who either changed their testimony or refused to testify in the retrial. The two duplicitous people in question were František Bušek (formerly Chobot) and his acquaintance Klaus Schimmelpfenig. Both of them had spent many years in German prison, where they initially met. According to Tykač's spokesperson, the two unsuccessfully tried to blackmail him. The businessman was allegedly contacted by people sent by Bušek that demanded a "significant sum of money" for not using the CS Funds trial to criminalise Tykač. Based on this testimony, the police and the prosecution tried to secure Tykač's property twice. In both cases the court found the decision as unjustified and it was canceled.

In March 2015 the police investigation ended after two and a half years with a recommendation for indictment submitted to the Chief Prosecutor's Office in Prague.

In December 2015 the High Prosecutor's Office in Prague terminated the prosecution against Tykač. State prosecutor Zdeněk Matula stated in the preamble that no evidence of Tykač's guilt had been found. This verdict thus ended 19 years of CS Funds cause. In his interview for Forbes magazine in 2014 Tykač stated that, in his opinion, the money from the funds disappeared during the management of its new owners, to whom the funds were sold by the Motoinvest group after pressure caused by a hostile attack of ČNB. This caused a wave of inspections of tax authorities, the Stock Exchange, Securities Office, a wave of police interrogations and strongly negative media atmosphere directed against "Motoinvest group".

Probably the definite end for CS funds was caused by Czech Television, which on 11 February 2020, broadcast in its main news program CT Events the following post: "Czech Television apologizes to Pavel Tykač for broadcasting a false and manipulative claim that Pavel Tykač is responsible for tunneling CS Funds, that Pavel Tykač was involved in committing fraud in CS Funds, that Pavel Tykač was involved in the purchase of the shares of Drůbež Příšovice by CS Funds and, as a result of transactions involving Mr. Pavel Tykač, the banks went bankrupt. This false claim was published on December 29, 2015 in a CT Events program article titled "The final point behind the CS Funds case".

== Involvement into the energy sector ==
Tykač kept a very low profile from the late 1990s only to re-emerge in 2006 with his purchase of shares in Czech Coal, since when he has aggressively defended the price demands of the company and lobbied for the cancellation of the brown coal mining limits in North Bohemia, beyond which lie huge coal reserves.

Tykač is the effective owner of Czech Coal with 50% of its shares. He originally purchased a 40% share in the company in spring 2006 and then quickly increased that share to 49% for allegedly nearly CZK 10 billion. Tykač purchased the additional 1% from his partners Petr Pudil and Vasil Bobela in 2009.

=== Ending coal war with the ČEZ group ===
At the turn of 2012–13, as the owner of Czech Coal, Tykač ended the so-called coal war about the price of brown coal with the ČEZ group. Eight years of conflict, which began even before Tykač joined the coal business, was terminated by a mutual agreement of the parties and by signing a 50-year contract about coal supply to the power plant Počerady.

=== Hard clash with EPH because of power plant Opatovice ===
In 2012 Tykač's Czech Coal terminated the contract for the supply of coal to the Opatovice Power Station, which belongs to the Energy and Industrial Holding (EPH) owned by Křetínský and JT Bank. Tykač justified this step by EPH having claims of half a billion CZK. The conflict between Czech Coal and EPH ended with amicable settlement in 2014. Part of the deal was the mutual termination of litigation.

=== The dispute with Sokolovská uhelná ===
Since 2006 Tykač supported the minority shareholder of Sokolov coal company Jan Kroužecký in his conflict with the majority shareholders. Subsequent litigation lasted for years. In 2015 the whole issue ended in an agreement when Kroužecký sold his shares to the company, that was now completely controlled by its majority shareholders František Štěpánek and Jaroslav Rokos. The price of Kroužecký's 30% share of the company was supposedly around 4-5 billion CZK. There are speculations that most of this money was received by Tykač, who had previously bought Kroužecký's share. Only Štěpánek publicly addressed ending of the dispute by saying that the company bought Kroužecký's share, there was a longstanding dispute settlement and that the parties consider the transaction to be positive and beneficial.

=== The case with Respekt ===
In 2013 weekly magazine Respekt published an information about the alleged freezing of Tykač's assets of roughly 19 bil CZK by Swiss claimants. This should have occurred due to the renewed prosecution in the case of stripped assets of CS Funds in the Czech Republic. Tykač denied any blocking of his assets with a statement that it is a deliberate or unconscious attempt to prevent the signing of a contract between ČEZ and Czech Coal about a long-term supply of coal to power plant Počerady.

=== US acquisition ===
In May 2020, Sev.en Group bought a 17% stake in Pennsylvania-based Corsa Coal. The company specializes in the mining of metallurgical coal for the production of iron and steel. This was Pavel Tykač's first major entry into the energy market in the United States. In June 2020, Sev.en Group announced the acquisition of Blackhawk Mining, which owns several metallurgical coal mines in West Virginia and Kentucky. The purchase price was not published, but it is estimated at 12 billion CZK.

== Charity ==
=== Women for Women foundation ===
This is a foundation established by Pavel and Ivana Tykač. Its mission is to support single mothers in need. It provides supported housing, as well as legal and psychosocial assistance. It also operates the “Lunch for Children” programme, which covers school meals for socially disadvantaged pupils. The programme is nationwide – the number of participants exceeds many thousands and is constantly expanding. This project fed nearly 2,100 children in almost 500 schools during the 2014/2015 school year. The regular annual contribution is about CZK 20 million.

=== Chytré hlavy pro sever (Smart Minds for the North) ===
A grant programme for schools in the Most Region providing modern and otherwise inaccessible teaching equipment. In 2017, the 8th year of the programme was held. The amount of the financial contribution is about CZK 2 million per year.

=== Cooperation with the town of Most and the municipalities in the vicinity of the coal mining area ===
This is a long-term partnership where a specific municipality identifies areas of interest in which the Sev.en Group companies will be financially involved. The partnership is generally focused on the construction of playgrounds and sports grounds, support for youth sports and community activities.

=== Černí andělé Most (Most Black Angels) ===
The support for the handball team from Most has a long tradition. Attributed to this support, the women's team from Most reached the top of the Czech league and regularly participates in European club competitions. It has strong public support and constantly developing youth facilities in the region.

=== The Ústí nad Labem Region and the regional Chambers of Commerce and the Economic and Social Councils of the Ústí nad Labem Region ===
Based on the cooperation agreement, Sev.en Group covers programmes or activities selected by individual entities within the Ústí nad Labem Region.

=== Most Hospital ===
As part of cooperation with the Most Hospital, the neonatal department of the Most Hospital was reconstructed in the monitored period.

=== The gift of Oxford ===
In 2018, Pavel Tykač and his wife Ivana became donors of the Czech language and Czech studies at Oxford University. They donated £1.2 million, which will be used to create a stable pedagogical background for at least two decades ahead. The university has added another £800,000 from its own resources. The result is a budget of two million pounds, which becomes the basis of the foundation's assets, which the university will continuously invest. Each year, the proceeds will be used to teach Czech at University College, the oldest college in Oxford. For the first time in history, the Department of this Language at Oxford has its specific donor. The so-called Ivana and Pavel Tykač Fellowship was created, which is a guarantee of a job that will cover the field for years to come.

== Family and personal life ==
Pavel Tykač is married for the second time. Together with his wife Ivana Tykač is raising eight children. He lives with his family in Switzerland.

Tykač played competitive table tennis in his youth, nowadays he plays recreational tennis and badminton league in Prague.
