= Open Gate - Grammar and Primary School =

Open Gate – Grammar and Primary School
- Open Gate – gymnázium a základní škola

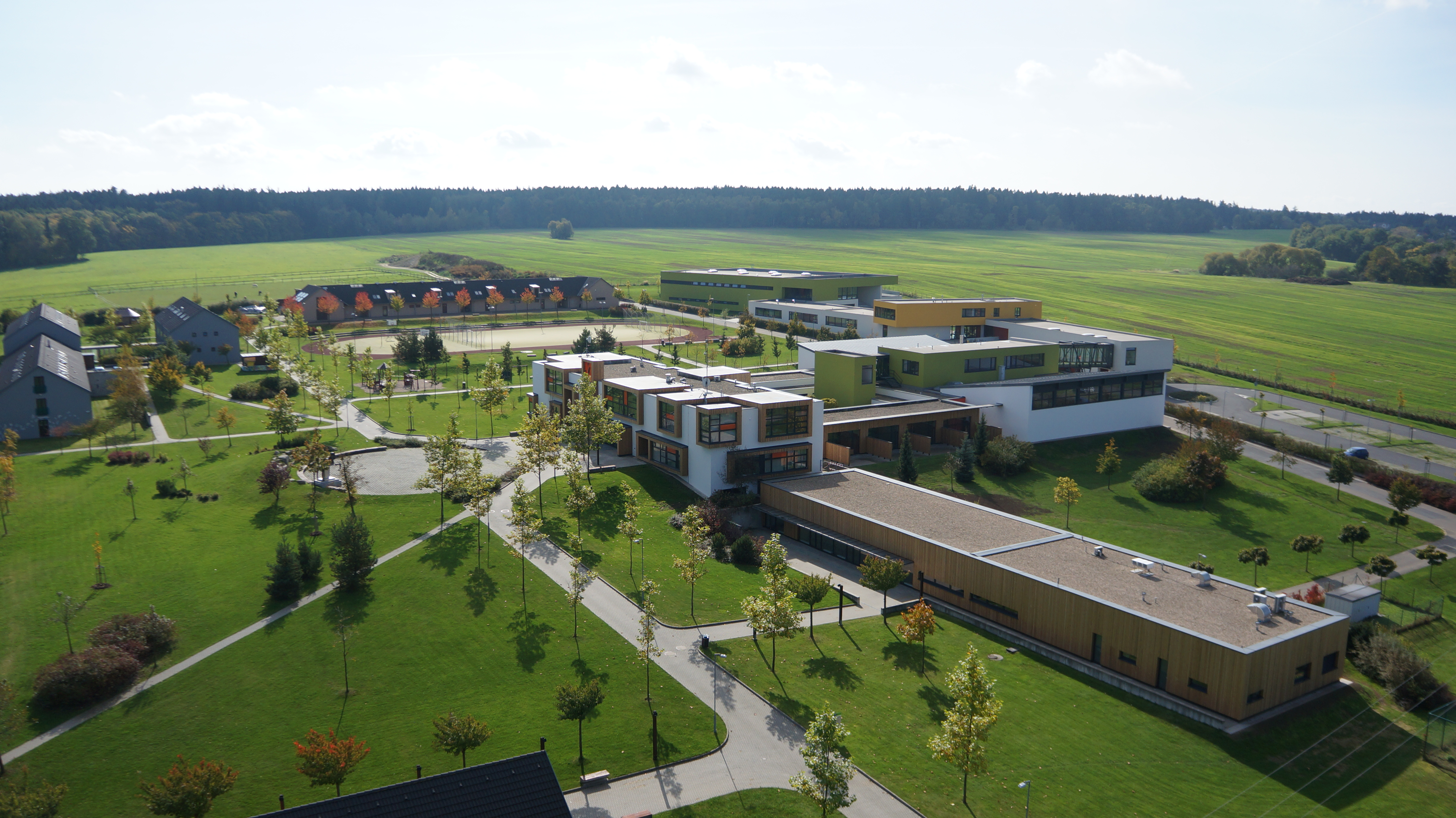

Location
- Na Návsi 5 Central Bohemian Region; Babice, 251 01; Czech Republic; 50°0′16.7″N 14°43′1.7″E

Information
- Type: Private primary school and eight-year gymnasium
- Established: 2005
- Founders: Petr Kellner; Renáta Kellnerová
- Principal: Petra Dobešová
- Gender: Co-educational
- Enrollment: 408 (2025/26)
- Website: www.opengate.cz/en/

Open Gate – Grammar and Primary School (Czech: Open Gate – gymnázium a základní škola) is a private primary school and eight-year grammar school in Babice, in the Central Bohemian Region nearby Prague. The grammar school offers on-campus boarding and combines the Czech national curriculum with the International Baccalaureate Diploma Programme.

The grammar school was founded in 2005 by Petr Kellner and Renáta Kellnerová. From the outset, it combined fee-paying private education with financial support for students from disadvantaged backgrounds, including children from low-income families and children's homes. A Czech-English primary school covering the first five grades was added in 2011.

== History ==
Open Gate's eight-year grammar school opened in Babice in September 2005. It was established with the support of Petr Kellner and Renáta Kellnerová through their Educa Foundation. From the beginning, the school combined fee-paying private education with scholarships for students from disadvantaged backgrounds, including children from low-income families and children's homes.

The school underwent several management and staff changes during its early years. Director Petr Albrecht left in 2007, followed by several teachers, some of whom later joined Nový PORG in Prague. Open Gate said the changes resulted from differing views about the school's future development. In 2009, Open Gate was authorized to offer the International Baccalaureate Diploma Programme.

Open Gate added primary education in 2010. In September 2011, it expanded this into a Czech-English primary school covering the first five grades, with 108 pupils enrolled at its opening. The campus was expanded at the same time. Also in 2011, the Educa Foundation became part of the Kellner Family Foundation, which continued to fund scholarships for Open Gate students.

In 2013, PPF Group acquired the site of the former Hotel Praha in Prague's Dejvice district for a planned second Open Gate school. The project, known as Open Gate II, was intended to be about twice the size of the Babice school. It was delayed by the permitting process and was abandoned in 2017.

The school's student mix changed over time while its scholarship programme continued. In 2025, about one tenth of students paid full tuition in the school's first year, compared with roughly two thirds by 2025. Other students received need-based or academic scholarships.

== Location ==
The Open Gate campus in Babice comprises a total of 7 hectares and its final construction costs came to 250 million Kč. The campus consists of the school and boarding facilities, library, theater, rural studies area including stables, the sports’ hall, swimming pool, all-weather outdoor multi-use sports’ ground and the refectory.

== The Grammar School ==
At the end of their studies at Open Gate, the students have the opportunity to sit for International Baccalaureate Diploma qualification, or the State Maturita.

== The Primary School ==
The educational plan of the Primary School is in agreement with the criteria as laid down by the Ministry of Education and Sport ČR and contains many guiding principles of the IB Primary Years Programme. Pupils are graded more by written comment than by the traditional numerical system.
