= Central Tower (Warsaw) =

Office building in Warsaw, Poland

Coordinates: 52.2267°N 21.0019°E

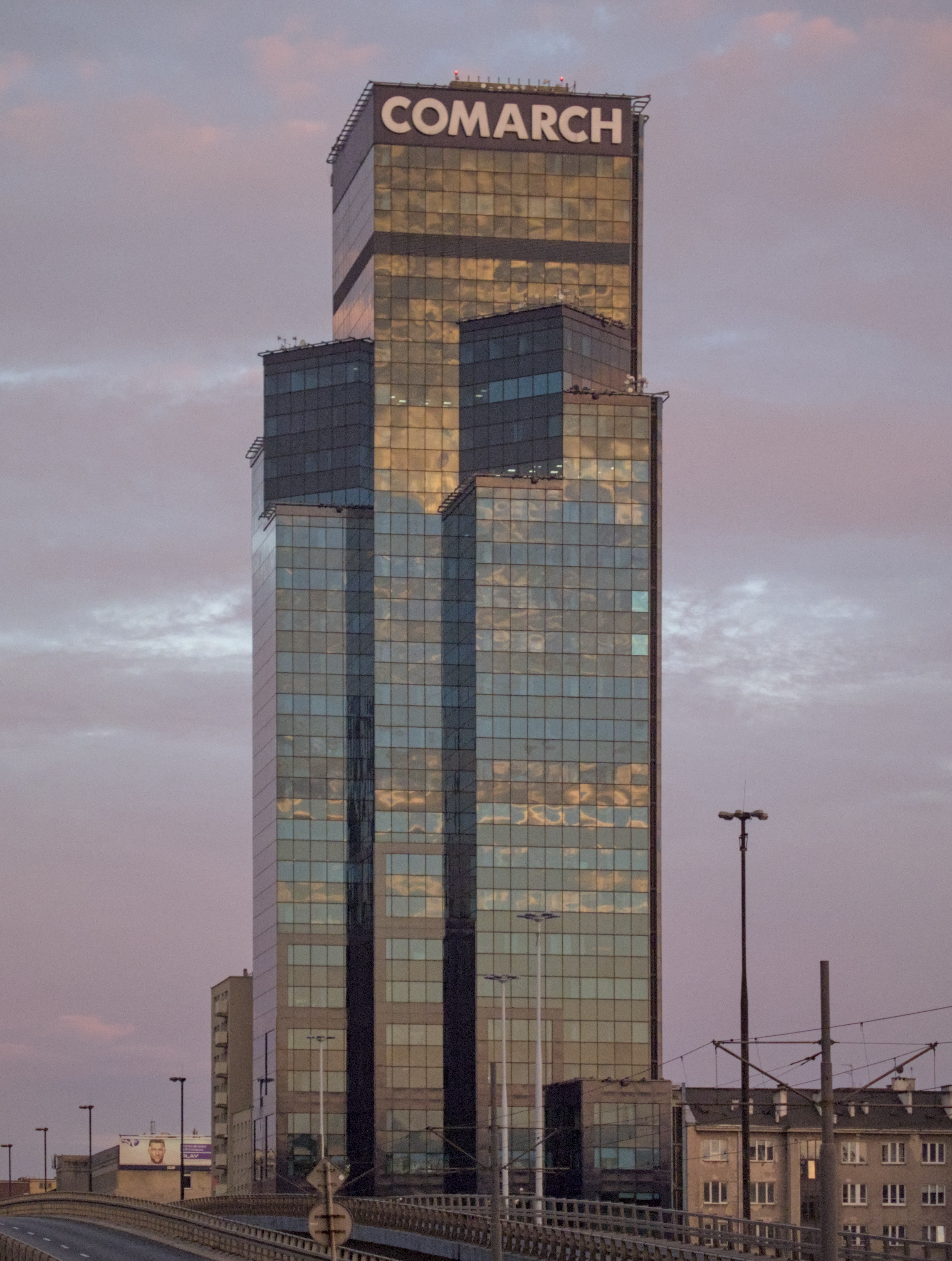
- The building with the logo of Comarch in 2017, since removed
- Interactive map of the Central Tower area

General information
- Type: Office building
- Architectural style: Modernist
- Location: Warsaw, 81 Aleje Jerozolimskie, Poland
- Construction started: 1992
- Completed: 1996
- Renovated: 2008
- Owner: CPI Polska Sp. z o.o.

Height
- Height: 115 m

Technical details
- Floor count: 27
- Floor area: 20,804 m²

Design and construction
- Architects: Lorenzo Martinoia, Jacek Sokalski, Amadeo Strada

Central Tower (formerly FIM Tower and ORCO Tower) is a 27-story, 115-meter (377 ft) high-rise office building at 81 Jerusalem Avenue in the Ochota district of Warsaw, Poland, on the corner of Tytusa Chałubińskiego Street. Completed in 1996, the tower provides 14,400 m^{2} (155,000 sq ft) of B-class lettable office space and 20,804 m^{2} (224,000 sq ft) of total floor area.

== History ==
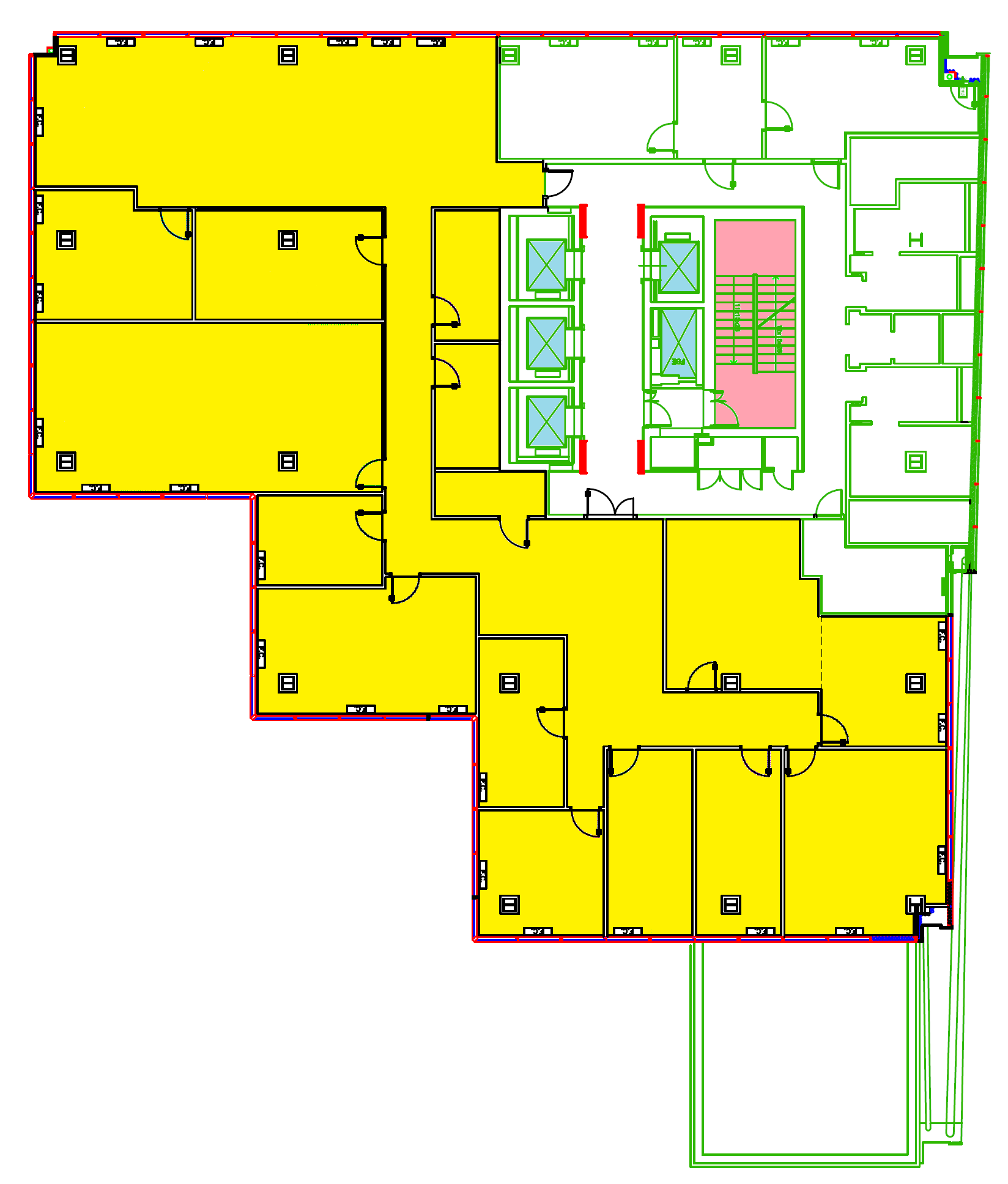
Floorplate of Central Tower. Yellow – offices; blue – lifts; red – staircase; white – corridor, toilets, kitchen and backrooms.

The plot was originally occupied by the modernist tenement of Burchard, erected in 1911 and demolished in 1973 when a temporary tram track was laid during the construction of the new Central Railway Station and the viaducts along Marchlewskiego Street (today Aleja Jana Pawła II w Warszawie).

The site remained vacant from 1992 to 1996, until Italian investment company Fortrade Financing S.p.A. financed FIM Tower, with a design inspired by late-modernist American skyscrapers of the 1980s. It stood out for the salmon-pink cladding that dominated its lower and western façades, contrasting sharply with the dark-blue curtain wall of the upper floors. At the time the building was frequently listed among Warsaw's least attractive high-rises, and featured in a 13-strong "ugliest buildings" poll run by Gazeta Wyborcza. The mobile-network operator Polkomtel was the anchor tenant until its move to Służewiec in 2006.

In July 2006 the Luxembourg-based Orco Property Group acquired the tower via its Endurance Fund and renamed it ORCO Tower. An ambitious recladding designed by Christian Biecher & Associés, replacing the pink panels with blue glass and topping the building with an openwork crystalline crown, was ultimately reduced to a budget facelift: the contrasting details were over-wrapped in dark foil and illuminated "ORCO Tower" signage was added. The refurbishment was completed in July 2008. Post-refurbishment tenants have included the Polish IT company Comarch, together with Bank Millennium and Raiffeisen Bank. In June 2012, for the UEFA Euro 2012 tournament, Nike wrapped the entire façade in a "My Time Is Now" banner that displayed 100-meter-high portraits of Polish soccer players Jakub Błaszczykowski, Robert Lewandowski and Wojciech Szczęsny.

The Czech investment fund CPI became the owner in December 2014 after acquiring Orco, and in February 2015 rebranded the property as Central Tower. CPI later announced further refurbishment plans, including a new lobby. Since 2018 one of the world's highest urban apiaries has operated on the roof of the building.

== Architecture and facilities ==
Central Tower is a setback prism that tapers toward the top and is articulated in a series of planes meeting at different angles. Although the original municipal consent limited the height to 20 stories, the restriction was lifted during design and an additional seven floors were added. The building has no underground levels and no internal car park (a planned 240-space garage was vetoed by the city). Corridors are narrow and windowless, requiring permanent artificial lighting, an intentional trade-off in favour of maximizing lettable space. The tower is served by four high-speed passenger elevator and one goods elevator. Standard floorplates feature raised floors, fan-coil air conditioning, a building-management system for energy control and maintenance, and a 24-hour staffed reception with security and alarm monitoring.
