= The Mozart Prague =

Hotel in Prague's Old Town

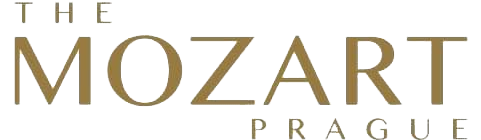

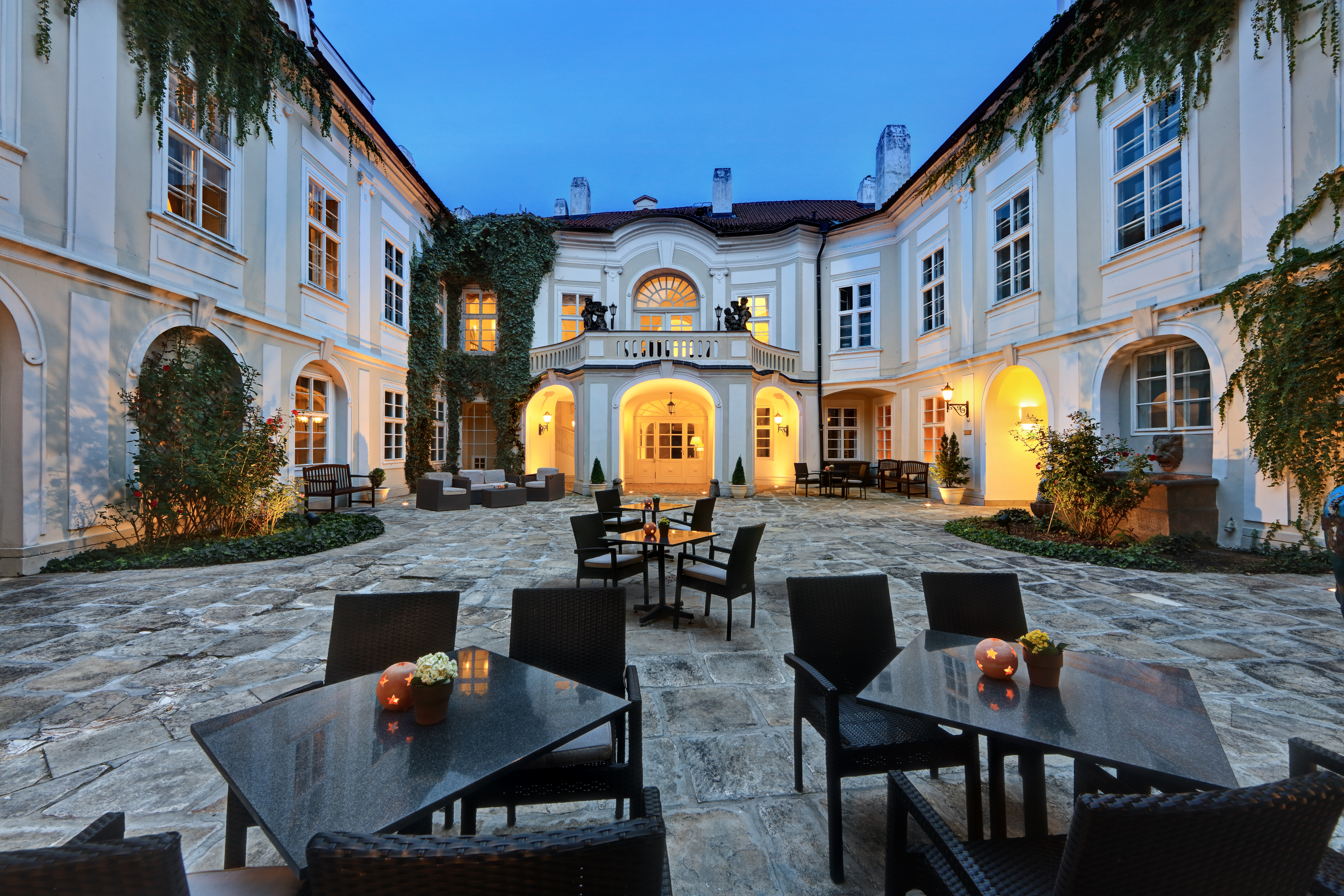
- The Mozart Prague
- Interactive map of the The Mozart Prague area

General information
- Type: Hotel
- Location: Karoliny Světlé 208/34, Prague 1, 110 00, Prague, Czech Republic
- Coordinates: 50.084659°N 14.414055°E

Website
- https://www.themozart.com/

The Mozart Prague (formerly the Smetana Hotel) is a luxury hotel in the historic center of Prague's Old Town, located at 208/34 Karoliny Světlé Street at the mouth of the street on the Smetana Embankment, in an area called the Anenský Triangle.

== Description ==
The hotel is located in the listed buildings of the Palace of the Pachts of Rájov on Anenské náměstí and the New Pacht Palace, also called Jirásek's House.

The Baroque palace is located in the eastern part of the complex and stands on the site of five medieval houses that were joined together in 1765 to the design of architect Jan Josef Wirch (some older sources mention Josef Jäger). The facades on Náprstkova and Stříbrná Streets are devoid of ornamental details. The northern part of the palace is partially covered by the building that has housed the Theatre on the Balustrade since 1958, and the only visible element is the former main entrance from Anenské náměstí, where the coat of arms is located. In the western wall, in the courtyard of the palace, there is a small fountain with a lion mascot. The south façade with a featured columned portico with a balcony and a passage from which a monumental double staircase leads to the hall.

On the grounds of the original palace garden, which reached down to the Vltava River, an apartment building in the classical style was built in 1836, designed by architect Jan Maxmilián Heger. The four-storey tenement building has a pavilion courtyard facade.

== History ==
During 2003 and 2004, both buildings were extensively renovated by TaK Architects under the supervision of the Národního Památkového Institute with the main aim of restoring both buildings to their original residential function. The renovation created 50 apartments with facilities and services, a reception, restaurant facilities and two accessible courtyards. The hotel was successfully opened under the name Mamaison Suite Hotel Pachtův Palác.

This successful renovation of both buildings was awarded Building of the Year in 2005. The building was then acquired by Jean-François Ott who restored it with the idea of creating a 5 star hotel.

At the beginning of 2015, a protracted dispute with the neighboring Theatre on the Balustrade, which since the 1960s had been using the space in the northern part of the Baroque palace as a foyer, the backstage entrance which is crucial for access to the stage, was brought to an end. By roofing its own inner courtyard, the theatre freed the remaining space back to the hotel.

The hotel is currently operated as an independent hotel, The Mozart Prague, and is a member of Preferred Hotels & Resorts, an American brand of independent hotels worldwide.

As in the past, the hotel also serves the general public as a cultural and social center.

== Monument protection ==
Both buildings have been protected as immovable cultural monuments since 1958.

Since 1971 they have been part of the Prague Conservation Area and since 1995 they have been a UNESCO World Heritage Site as part of the historic center of Prague.
