= C. S. Fondy a.s. =

C. S. Fondy a.s. comprises three mutual funds that were previously managed by C. S. Fund, Inc., an investment company: namely, the C.S. Capital Gains Fund, the C.S. Energetics Fund, and the C.S. Regular Dividend Fund. Since 1998, the funds have been managed by AKRO Investment Company, Inc. under the names AKRO Progressive Companies Fund, AKRO Global Equities Fund and AKRO Balanced Fund.

== C. S. Fondy management ==
Until February 1997, C. S. Fondy were managed by the C. S. Fund, Inc., an investment company controlled by a larger number of investors associated with the so-called Motoinvest group.

After the receivership of Agrobanka in September 1996, the group decided to urgently sell off all their assets and leave the market; in the context the owners of the C. S. Fund, Inc. decided to sell the company as well. This occurred in February 1997 when the C. S. Fund, Inc. was sold to a Cyprus-based company Austell Enterprises Ltd. Two changes of owners followed: Austell sold S. C. Fund, Inc. to a Czech company Crassus, Ltd. who later sold it to a Russian company Kos-Mos. The new management of C. S. Fund, Inc., appointed by the Russian owner, then stripped C. S. Fondy of its assets.

Subsequently, the management of C. S. Fondy was transferred to AKRO Investment Company by decision of the Ministry of Finance, which manages it up to now.

== C. S. Fondy assets stripping ==
C. S. Fondy were stripped of their assets shortly after the C. S. Fund, Inc. came into the possession of Russian company Kos-Mos. C. S. Fondy were taken over in a state where the majority of their assets were in bank accounts of the individual C. S. Fondy in the form of cash due to the anticipated opening of the fund and expectations of equity markets decline.

The Board of Directors, shareholders and fund management learned about the changing of the owner on 3 March 1997, when Prague notary Robert Hochman certified Moscow's KosMos, Ltd. as the new owner of C. S. Fondy, represented by Nikolai Trofimov.

Company representatives of KosMos Ltd. had the same notary register three Czech citizens as the new statutory representative of the C. S. Fondy. One of them, at that time, twenty one years old, unemployed young man Vaclav Franta from Chrastava near Liberec got the right to sign a power of attorney to carry out transactions of the company. Later that day he took full advantage of it: he came to a Plzeň bank where the money of the funds was deposited and demonstrated his newly acquired power of attorney from representatives of KosMos Ltd. and instructed to transfer 1.23 billion CZK, which were the entire assets of C. S. Fondy, on behalf of the British Swirlglen Ltd to purchase virtually worthless shares of the company Drůbež Příšovice, which even were not publicly traded.

The money traveled through the brokerage company Umana (the trade was mediated by Umana brokers Josef Matoulek and Vladislav Naď) to Prague bank Girocredit to an account of the company Swirlglen. From there they were supposed to be transferred abroad. Girocredit considered the operation to be so suspicious that they asked for an investigation by the Financial Analytical Department of the Ministry of Finance (FAÚ MF), which alone had the right to suspend the transfers.

However, the director of FAÚ MF Jiří Kudlík allowed the transfer of the money abroad on 11 March 1997 after being visited by two representatives of the company Swirlglen. Thus on 12 March 1997 virtually all of the property of C. S. Fondy definitely disappeared in accounts in Switzerland, Liechtenstein, Gibraltar and the United States.

== Investigation and its results ==
The shareholders of C. S. Fondy were not content with the loss of their money and made a series of compensation claims. In January 2001, a judge of the Municipal Court in Prague Hana Hubáčková adjudged sentences ranging from 5 to 10 years over the four men involved in the billions being stolen from the C. S. Fondy. However, in September 2003, a judge of the High Court in Prague Pavel Zelenka returned the case to the Municipal Court with the requirement of evidence completion. His main complaint was that the Municipal Court used as evidence Russian interrogation of Trofimov, which the advocates of the defendants were not allowed to participate in.

In March 2002, the clients of C. S. Fondy won the dispute with the Plzeň bank which, as a depository for the funds, was not supposed to carry out the suspicious transaction.

Since mid 1999, the executives of Crassus company, Petr Müller and Jaromír Florián, were prosecuted because by a few financial transactions they created worthless shares of Poultry Příšovice a.s., which were sold to KosMos, Ltd. for more than a billion CZK.

At the end of February 2003, an important verdict in the case of C. S. Fondy stripping of assets was made. Judge of the District Court for Prague 4 Hronová decided that the Treasury must compensate one of the shareholders of the C. S. Fondy, Zdeňek Řepka from Hradec Králové, 88,000 CZK plus the cost of the legal proceedings. The verdict meant good news primarily for the other C. S. Fondy shareholders. It was in fact the first ever compensation controversy which the Treasury lost.

In October 2007, the police suggested to the prosecutors that Pavel Tykač should be accused of the stripping of assets of C. S. Fondy as well. Tykač was allowed a retrial in early 2013. This was suggested by the Chief Public Prosecutor's Office in Prague in 2012 based on the allegations of businessman Frantisek Bušek (formerly Chobota) and his companions Klaus Schimmelpfennig and Oscar Gerlach that Tykač was responsible for the C. S. Fondy stripping of assets. They submitted the minutes of an alleged meeting in Kufstein, Austria, where they were supposed to be negotiating the division of the stolen money. The argument of these people was extremely challenged when the presented minutes of the alleged meeting proved to be clearly forged. According to forensic experts, the creator of the minutes, which were supposed to be created in 1997, used Calibri font which was created a few years later (designed in 2003 and expanded for everyday use in 2007), which clearly indicates the very antedating of the record. They themselves refused to testify either out of fear of being prosecuted, or as witnesses they testified to something else, when according to the evidence the C. S. Fondy money ended up in the accounts of persons other than Pavel Tykač.

Tykač himself stated from the beginning that already in 2011 Bušek blackmailed him that if he did not pay 500 millions CZK, he would produce evidence against him and accuse him of C. S. Fondy assets stripping. The statement was not proven to be true yet but the fact is that the renewed prosecution Tykač was accompanied by a number of other substandard conditions and steps which have become the subject of discussion in professional circles and also drew attention to the systemic weaknesses of the monitoring activity of the prosecutors (in this case the prosecutor repeatedly disregarded the binding findings of the High and Supreme court). The prosecutor's office eventually stopped the prosecuting of Tykač in December 2015 after nearly three years of renewed investigation.

Another person talked about in connection with C. S. Fondy assets stripping at least since 2004, but never accused of it, is the controversial financier Petr Sisák. His former girlfriend Lucie Lunde (formerly Václavíková) and also the sentenced Josef Matoulek pointed out Sisák and people surrounding him. Demonstrably the people from his surroundings were connected with the case: Sisák's father-in-law Jaromír Florián (at the time the executive director and shareholder of Crassus, Ltd., which sold the C. S. Fondy to the Russian KosMos) or Sisák's longtime collaborator Peter Müller (along with Jaromír Florián he was the Managing Director and Shareholder of Crassus. Previously, he was involved, among other things, with Sisák's wife Věra and his father-in-law Florián in the first Silesian capital company, which among other things has previously owned a significant stake in poultry plants Příšovice, factual predecessors of Poultry Příšovice). The convicted in the case Matoulek described Sisák with Florián and Vasil Mohorita, Florián's half-brother and former chairman of SSM, as the main masterminds behind the C. S. Fondy assets stripping.

Finally, the already mentioned Bušek, Schimmelpfennig and Gerlach or their collaborator Gunnar Kühn, the former CEO of Swirlglen, via which the stolen money traveled abroad, were never accused in this case even though they admitted the participation in the fraud.

== Compensation ==
The forced Administrator of C. S. Fondy with the help of hired lawyers and detective agencies managed to track down a significant part of the stolen money and get about 200mil CZK back. AKRO received another 650mil for the funds from the sale of compensation claims against the Plzeň bank.

In 2012, AKRO recovered an additional amount of almost 2.1 billion CZK in compensation for damage from the state. The verdict was subsequently overturned by the Supreme Court, but since in the meantime the state had already paid the compensation amount to AKRO and AKRO refused to return the amount paid, the state currently seeks return of the money by legal actions arising from unjust enrichment. In case the lawsuit ended in favor of AKRO and AKRO would not be required to return the money, the acquired amount for the damage compensation, of which a considerable part consists of high interest rates, would reach 2.9 billion CZK. Thus it would significantly exceeded the original amount of the caused damage. The whole affair can paradoxically end very favourably for the shareholders of former C. S. Fondy.
