= Knik Glacier =

Glacier in the United States

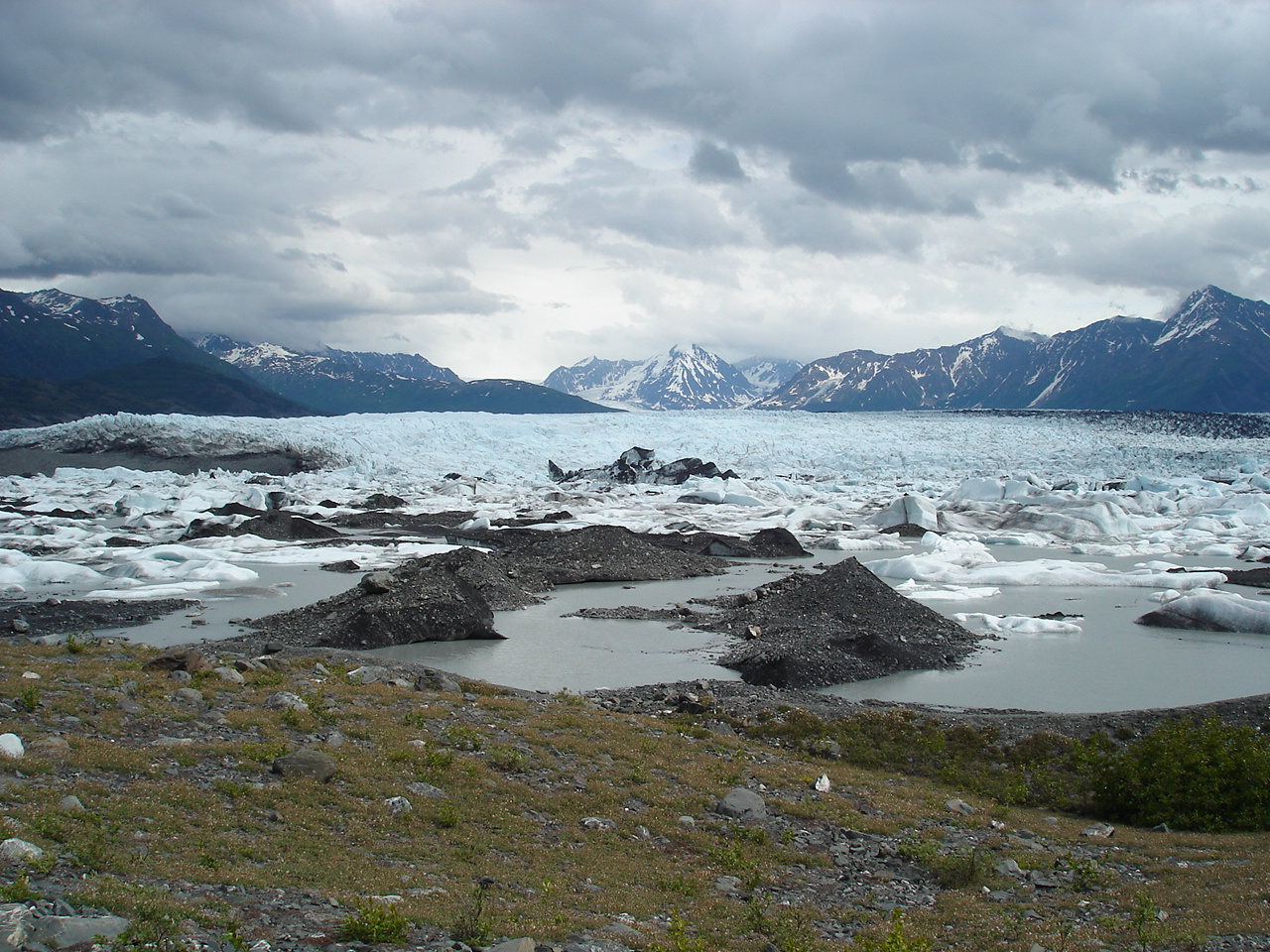
- Knik Glacier

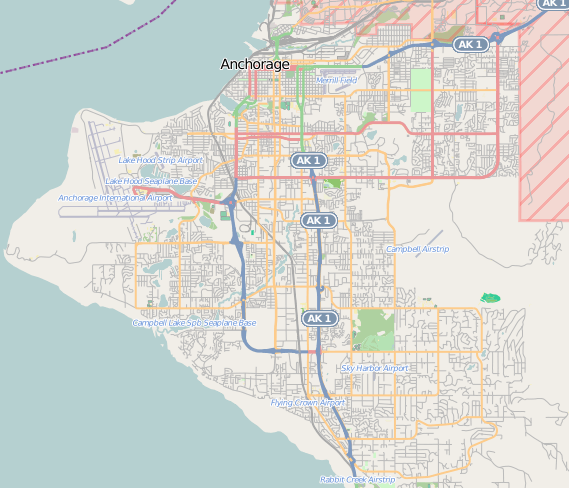
- Location within Anchorage Location within Alaska
- Interactive map of Knik Glacier
- Type: Mountain glacier
- Location: Anchorage and Chugach Census Area, Alaska, U.S.
- Coordinates: 61°22′2.8488″N 148°17′55.3092″W
- Length: 25 miles (40 km)
- Terminus: glacial lake
- Status: retreating

The Knik Glacier (Dena'ina: Skitnu Łi'a) is an ice field located 50 miles (80 km) east of Anchorage, Alaska on the northern end of the Chugach Mountains. The ice field averages over 25 miles (40 km) long and over 5 miles (8.0 km) across, making it one of the largest glaciers in southcentral Alaska. Knik Glacier feeds the 25-mile (40 km) long Knik River which empties into the Knik Arm section of Cook Inlet.

Lake George, a National Natural Landmark Lake and the largest glacier-dammed lake in North America, was formed by its outlet being blocked by Knik Glacier.

== Lake George ==
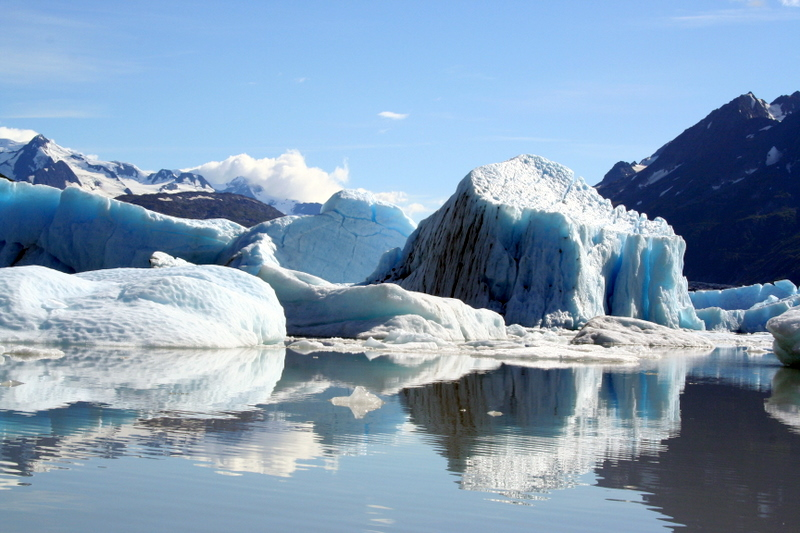
Lake George (2007)

Lake George 61°15′00″N 148°37′00″W, a glacial lake formed near the face of the glacier, received national recognition by the National Natural Landmark (NNL) Program. Lake George was recognized because of a unique natural phenomenon called a "jökulhlaup", an Icelandic term for glacial lake outburst flood. The breakup of this ice dam would send a violent wall of water, ice and debris down the river valley causing massive flooding and sometimes devastation to local settlers' properties. The jökulhlaup occurred annually until it ceased in 1967 due to glacial recession, thought to be associated with the massive Good Friday earthquake of 1964.

== History ==
Early pioneers were said to hold a yearly lottery, gambling on the exact date when the jökulhlaup would break and flood the Knik River Valley. The flooding would often close vital transportation routes between Anchorage and the Matanuska-Susitna Valley.

== Cinema ==
In 1991, Paramount Pictures used Knik Glacier to film a portion of Star Trek VI: The Undiscovered Country. Knik Glacier was the setting for a scene in which Captain Kirk and Dr McCoy are rescued from the Klingon ice planet prison Rura Penthe. It is also featured as the backdrop for Lauren Daigle's video on her song Rescue.

== Tourism ==
The glacier is a tourist attraction, sharing its natural beauty with locals and visitors from around the world. With several tour companies operating in the area, visitors can view the glacier by air via a flightseeing company, all-terrain vehicle, jetboat, airboat charter, or on a guided packrafting tour.

The Knik Glacier and the beginning of the Knik River are managed under the Knik River Public Use Area (KRPUA) Management Plan. The KRPUA is a legislatively designated area managed by the State of Alaska's Department of Natural Resources (DNR), Division of Mining, Land, and Water, Southcentral Regional Office.

== Helicopter crash ==
On the 27th of March 2021, a heli-skiing crash occurred in the south of the glacier, killing 5 of the 6 on board. Among the dead was the businessman Petr Kellner, who at the time of his death was the wealthiest person in the Czech Republic.
