= Renáta Kellnerová =

Czech billionaire businesswoman (born 1967)

- Born: Renáta Hacklová; 4 July 1967 (age 58)
- Spouse: Petr Kellner (died 2021)
- Children: 4, including Anna Kellnerová

Renáta Kellnerová (born 4 July 1967) is the widow of Petr Kellner, Czech billionaire entrepreneur and founder of the PPF Group, who died in March 2021 in a helicopter crash.

Kellnerová's husband, Petr Kellner, founded the PPF Group in the early 1990s; the company became one of the largest investment groups in Europe, with assets worth around 39.7 billion euros (as of the end of 2020). From 1993 to 1997, under her maiden surname Hacklová, she was a member of the board of directors of PPF moravskoslezský investiční fond a.s., one of the predecessors of PPF Group.

In 2002, she co-founded the Educa Foundation which aimed at providing scholarships to students of the Open Gate - Grammar and Primary School in Babice. In 2009, the Kellners founded The Kellner Family Foundation that over the ten years of its existence dispersed CZK 1.6 billion in support of educational activities in the Czech Republic.

After the death of Petr Kellner, Kellnerová became beneficiary owner, controlling Kellner’s 98.93% stake in the PPF Group, and one of the wealthiest Czech citizens.

Kellnerová was listed in the 2022, The World's Billionaires, published by Forbes, with an estimated wealth of $16.6 billion. As of February 2026, Forbes estimated the family's net worth, at US$19.7 billion.

She has three daughters, including Anna Kellnerová, a Czech showjumper. With her husband, they also raised Kellner's son from a previous relationship.
