= 2021 Knik Glacier helicopter crash =

2021 helicopter crash in Alaska

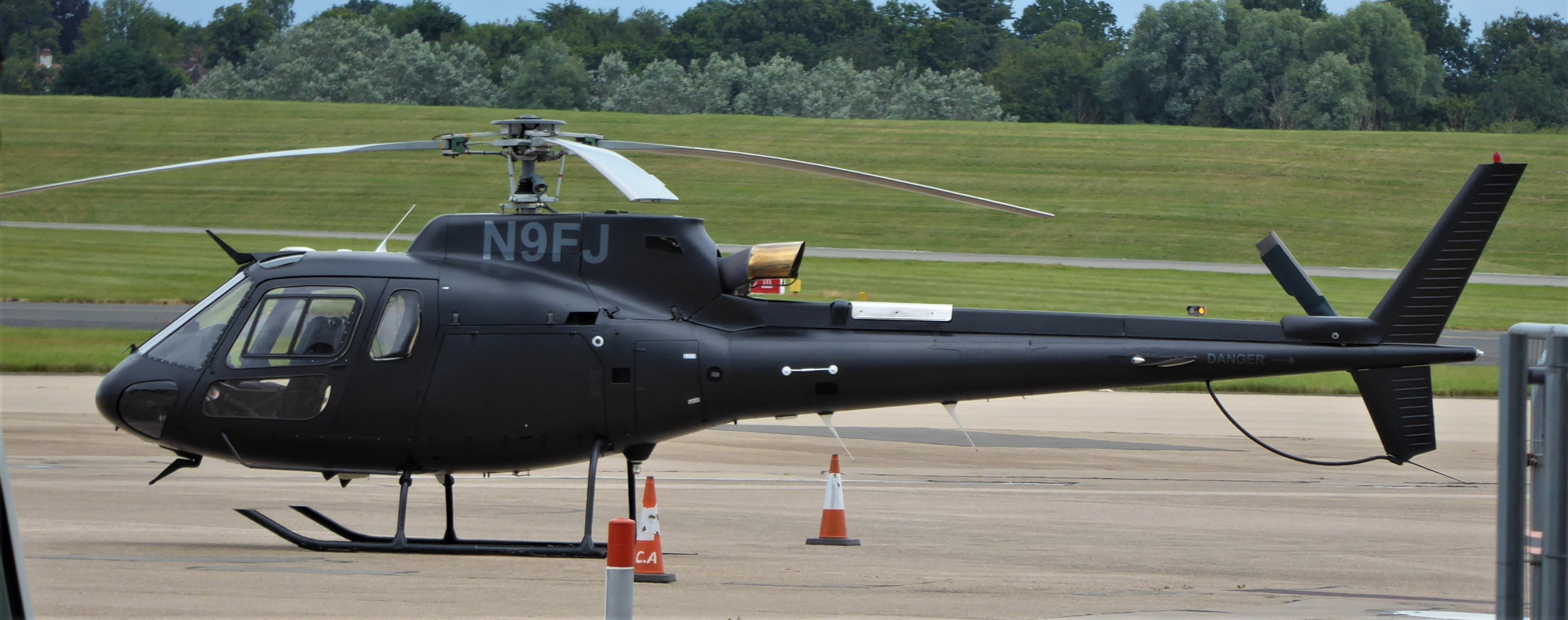
- An AS350 B3 similar to the one involved in the incident

Accident
- Date: March 27, 2021
- Summary: Pilot error in IMC
- Site: near Knik Glacier, Palmer, Alaska; 61.447°N 148.391°W

Aircraft
- Aircraft type: Airbus AS350 B3
- Operator: Soloy Helicopters
- Registration: N351SH
- Occupants: 6
- Passengers: 5
- Crew: 1
- Fatalities: 5
- Injuries: 1
- Survivors: 1

On 27 March 2021, an Airbus AS350B3 helicopter crashed near the Knik Glacier, Palmer, Alaska. Five occupants died, including Czech billionaire entrepreneur Petr Kellner; one occupant survived.

== Aircraft ==
The helicopter involved in the accident was an Airbus AS350B3, registration N351SH.

== Accident ==
Approximate location of the accident, Knik Glacier (Alaska)

On 27 March 2021, an Airbus AS350B3 helicopter crashed near the Knik Glacier, Palmer, Alaska during a heliskiing trip in Alaska's backcountry.

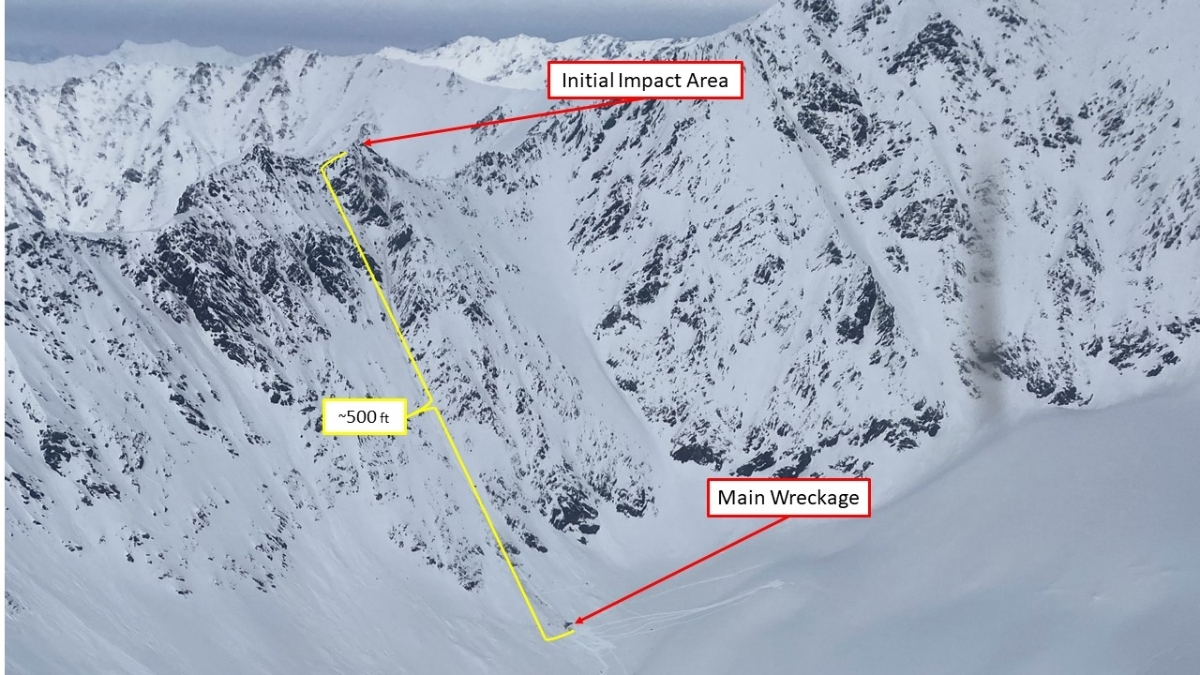
The crash site

The helicopter crashed into a mountain between Metal Creek and Grasshopper Valley at about 5,500 feet (1,700 m), 10 or 15 feet (3 or 4 m) from the top of the ridge, and rolled some 800 or 900 feet (240 or 270 m) downhill. The missing helicopter was reported to the authorities two hours after the tracking signal stopped.

== Victims ==
Five occupants died, one survived. One of the victims was Czech billionaire entrepreneur Petr Kellner. According to court filings, Kellner survived the crash and lived for two more hours but “died while waiting for rescue,” while another victim is also believed to have survived initially; rescuers were informed about the overdue helicopter more than 2.5 hours after the crash. The lone survivor was found 5 hours, and rescued 6 hours, after the crash; he lost all fingers of his left hand and some fingers of his right hand. The family of Kellner and two other victims filed lawsuits.

== Investigation ==
The wreckage was moved to Anchorage for investigation. A preliminary report on the accident was published 13 April 2021; according to the preliminary report, GPS data show the helicopter hovered at a low altitude and speed (about one knot, about 1 mph), maneuvering over the ridge in the last three minutes of the flight. It crashed at about 18:35 AKDT.

According to the final report, the probable cause of the incident was "the pilot’s failure to adequately respond to an encounter with whiteout conditions"; contributing to the accident was:

The operator’s inadequate pilot training program and pilot competency checks, which failed to evaluate pilot skill during an encounter with inadvertent instrument meteorological conditions, and the Federal Aviation Administration principal operations inspector’s insufficient oversight of the operator, including their approval of the operator’s pilot training program without ensuring that it met requirements. Contributing to the severity of the surviving passenger’s injuries was the delayed notification of search and rescue organizations.
