= Sotio =

Czech biotechnology company

SOTIO
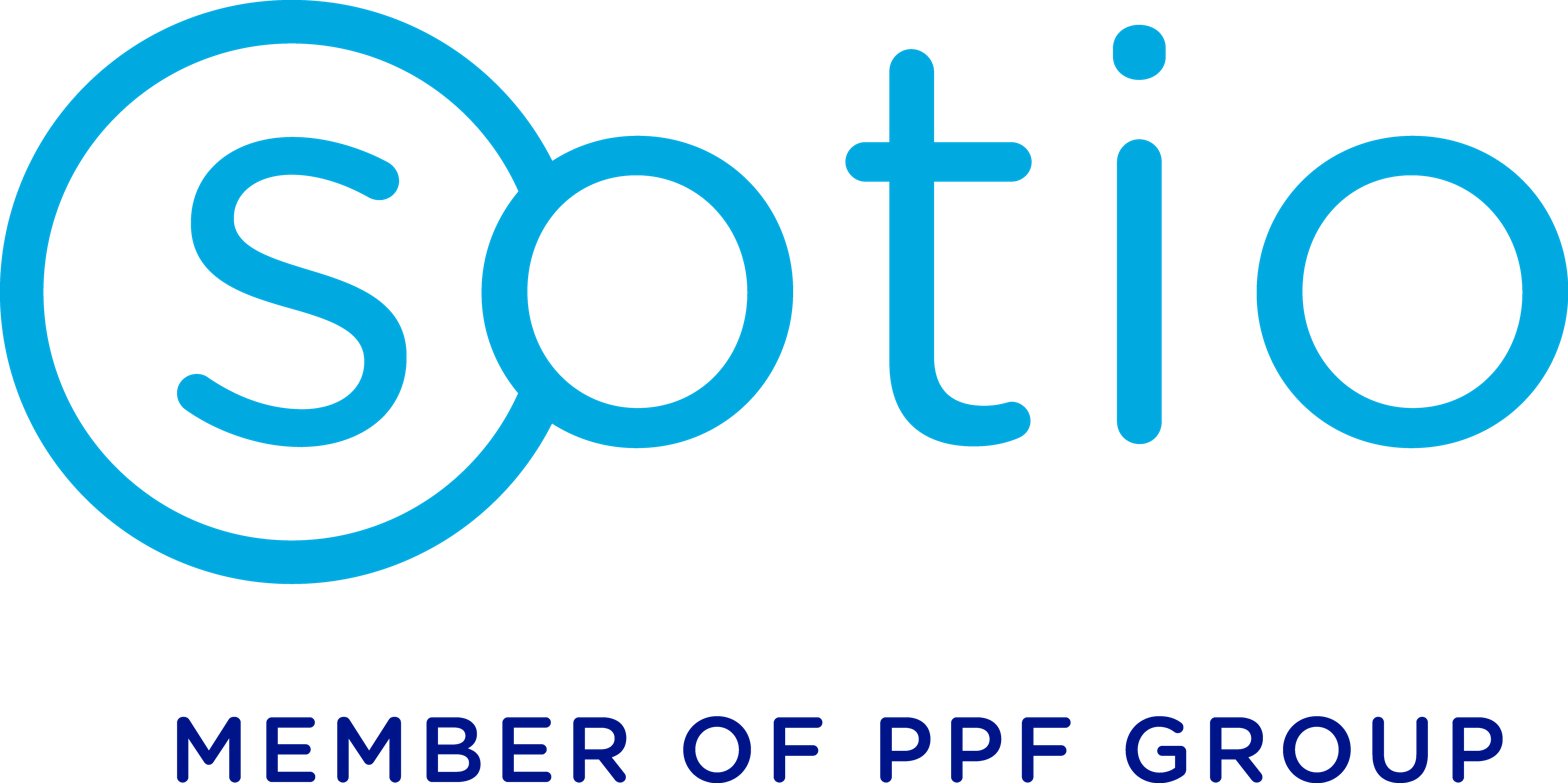
- Industry: Biotechnology, Pharmaceutical
- Founded: 2010
- Founder: Petr Kellner
- Headquarters: Prague, Czech Republic
- Key people: Radek Špíšek, CEO
- Number of employees: 100–199
- Website: www.sotio.com

Sotio (officially SOTIO Biotech) is a clinical-stage biotechnology company focused on research and development of next-generation cancer immunotherapies, with operations in Europe and North America. The company has clinical programs which include a superagonist of the immuno-oncology target IL-15 and new generation of potent and stable antibody-drug conjugates (ADCs).

== Founding ==
The company was founded in 2010 and in 2012 became part of PPF Group, established by Petr Kellner. The CEO of the company is Radek Špíšek, who has been with the company since its beginning, initially functioning as Chief Scientific Officer.

== Operations ==
SOTIO operates globally, with offices in Prague, Czech Republic, Basel, Switzerland, and Boston, United States.

== Pipeline ==
SOTIO is currently developing and testing multiple oncology products at different stages of preclinical and clinical development.

=== Immunocytokines ===
SOTIO is developing SOT201, an immunocytokine fusing a proprietary IL-15 superagonist to an anti-PD-1 antibody. As a PD-1-targeted and cis-acting attenuated IL-15 agonist, SOT201 is designed to preferentially activate PD-1+CD8+ T cells, inducing superior anti-tumor effects and reinvigorating exhausted CD8+ T cells in PD-1 sensitive and resistant tumors. SOT201 entered the clinic in May 2024 with the Phase 1 VICTORIA-01 clinical trial.

=== Antibody Drug Conjugates ===
SOTIO is advancing a pipeline of antibody-drug conjugates (ADCs) to treat solid tumors through collaborations with Biocytogen, Synaffix, LigaChem, and NBE-Therapeutics. Its two most advanced ADC therapeutic candidates are SOT109, an anti-CDH17 ADC in development for the treatment of colorectal cancer, and SOT106, an anti-LRRC15 ADC in development for the treatment of LRRC15+ sarcomas and other solid tumors.

== Investments ==
SOTIO has its own scientific research and development and also collaborates with other partners. In recent years, SOTIO and PPF have focused also on investing in biotechnology companies developing innovative anticancer treatments in Europe and the US.

At the end of 2020, PPF sold its stake in NBE-Therapeutics, a company developing innovative ADC products for the treatment of solid tumours, to the leading global pharmaceutical company Boehringer Ingelheim. This deal, the largest of its kind to be witnessed in Europe in ten years, showed the value of the ADCs that SOTIO maintains in its portfolio and that it continues to develop.

SOTIO is also managing PPF's investments in biotechnology companies Autolus Therapeutics and Cellestia Biotech.
