= PPF Banka =

- Company type: Public limited company
- Industry: economics of banking financial sector
- Founded: 1992
- Headquarters: Prague, Czech Republic
- Key people: Petr Jirásko (Director General)
- Products: Corporate banking for institutions and the public sector, Private banking
- Revenue: 7,131,000,000 Czech koruna (2023)
- Net income: 4,081,000,000 Czech koruna (2023)
- Total assets: 385,293,000,000 Czech koruna (2023)
- Owner: PPF Financial Holdings B.V. (92.96%), Prague city (6.73%)
- Number of employees: 260 (2023)
- Website: www.ppfbanka.cz/en

PPF Banka is a Czech bank that focuses mainly on providing financial, investment and consulting services as well as private banking. It is a major subsidiary of PPF (company), which owns 93% of the bank. Its clients are primarily financial institutions, medium and large enterprises with Czech capital and municipal sphere entities.

As of 2017 the bank’s profit has risen at an annual rate of 15% to 1 385 million CZK.

== History ==
PPF bank was founded in 1992 under the trade name Royal bank CS. The Czech capital city Prague became the major shareholder in 1995. The bank then changed its name to První městská banka, a.s. (First city bank Plc).

In 2002, the bank’s major shareholder changed and Česká pojišťovna a.s. (Czech insurance company Plc), which was a member of PPF group, became the strategic investor. The bank eventually integrated fully into the PPF group and has been active as PPF banka since 2004.

== See also ==
- List of banks in the Czech Republic
