= ORCO =

Real estate development company

Orco Property Group
- Type: SA
- Industry: real estate development
- Founded: 1991
- Founder: Jean-François Ott
- Headquarters: Capellen, Luxembourg
- Revenue: ▼13.96 million EUR (2015)
- Operating income: ▼ -13.4 million EUR (2015)
- Net income: ▲ -20.8 million EUR (2015)
- Total assets: ▲378.6 million EUR (2015)
- Number of employees: 3 (2015)
- Parent: CPI Property Group (97.31%)
- Website: www.orcogroup.com

Orco Property Group S.A. (ORCO Group, ORCO) is a real estate development company based in Luxembourg, listed on the Euronext in Paris, Prague, Warsaw and Budapest Stock Exchange, it is a subsidiary of CPI Property Group.

The Group works in Central Europe since 1991, Orco Property Group’s portfolio includes IPB Real, Mamaison Collection, Viterra Development, Gewerbesiedlungs-Gesellschaft mbH (GSG) and Orco Real Estate. The team consists of over 2500 people from 15 different countries. Orco Property Group become sponsor and manager of the Endurance Real Estate Fund for Central Europe, a Luxembourg–regulated, closed–end and umbrella fund.

== Structure, operations ==
ORCO operated, through its subsidiaries, mainly in Central and Eastern European (CEE). It developed real estate markets of Croatia, Czech Republic, Germany (Berlin, Duisburg, Düsseldorf, Frankfurt am Main, Hamburg, and Munich, expanding the group's focus into ripe markets of western Germany, Berlin fitting into the CEE strategy), Hungary, Luxembourg, Poland, Russia, and Slovakia. As of 2016, company operated in the Czech Republic, Hungary, Luxembourg, and Poland

The company was established in Luxembourg and started its activities in the Czech Republic in 1991. In 1999, its expansion to other countries began by investing in Budapest. Since 2000, the company was listed on the Euronext, Prague, Budapest, and Warsaw Stock Exchange, next to Paris (main listing) and Frankfurt. In 2009, the company requested protection from claims by creditors in France. By 2016, the company was delisted from all stock exchanges and acquired by CPI Property Group.

== Ownership ==
In 2007, according to company report, the major shareholders were Orco Holding S.A. (11.15%), Bernard Gauthier (4.33%) and Jardenne Corporation S.a.r.l. (4.22%); 80.3% of shares were on free float.

In 2008 the stake of Jean-François Ott, owned through his Ott & Co, decreased to 1.6% on a compulsory sale due to his liquidity problems. The once majority holder – at the IPO in 2001 his stake was 94%, since then gradually declining – became the fourth-largest shareholder in Orco. According to the company report, the US private equity fund European Investors became the new biggest shareholder with 5.4%. Bernard Gauthier and Jardenne Corp. held 2.5% each; the rest, some 88 percent, were on free float.

In the beginning of 2009 the Czech-based investment fund Prosperita became the largest shareholder with over 5%, closely followed by European Investors fund with 4.7%, a subsidiary of B with 4.2%, Bernard Gauthier with 1.9%, and Ott & Co, the investment vehicle of Jean-François Ott, holding on his 1.6%.

In 2016 the company was acquired by CPI Property Group.

== Property value, bubble crash of 2007/08 ==
ORCO Group valuated its property portfolio to EUR 2.7 billion in the first half of 2008, down from 2,95 million EUR reported in 2007. As of June 2009 ORCO's real estate portfolio value fell to EUR 1.83 billion from EUR 2.13 billion in the previous period according to the company's report.

ČTK's sources say further that "Orco struggles a high degree of indebtedness ... Orco's debts total as much as some EUR 1.6 bn ... under a six-month court protection against creditors, with management expecting a possible extension by several weeks ... at the same time in talks about capital investment with US firm Colony Capital and is undergoing restructuring. Orco said ... to focus its future activities on Prague and Berlin."

In 2008 and 2009, after the latest (as of 2009) real estate bubble crash, Czech Business Weekly (CBW) reported problems within the Czech subsidiary – in June 2009 Orco being "still on the verge of bankruptcy and, despite being under protection of a Paris court, might not survive the year without a capital increase from a new investor" and about Jean-François Ott's "talks on a capital increase with U. S.-based investment fund Colony Capital".

Company was sold to CPI Property Group, renamed as GSG Group and again renamed to CPI Property Group.

== Czech Republic ==
In 2003, ORCO, through its Czech subsidiary, purchased the Czech leading property group IPB Real.

== Germany ==
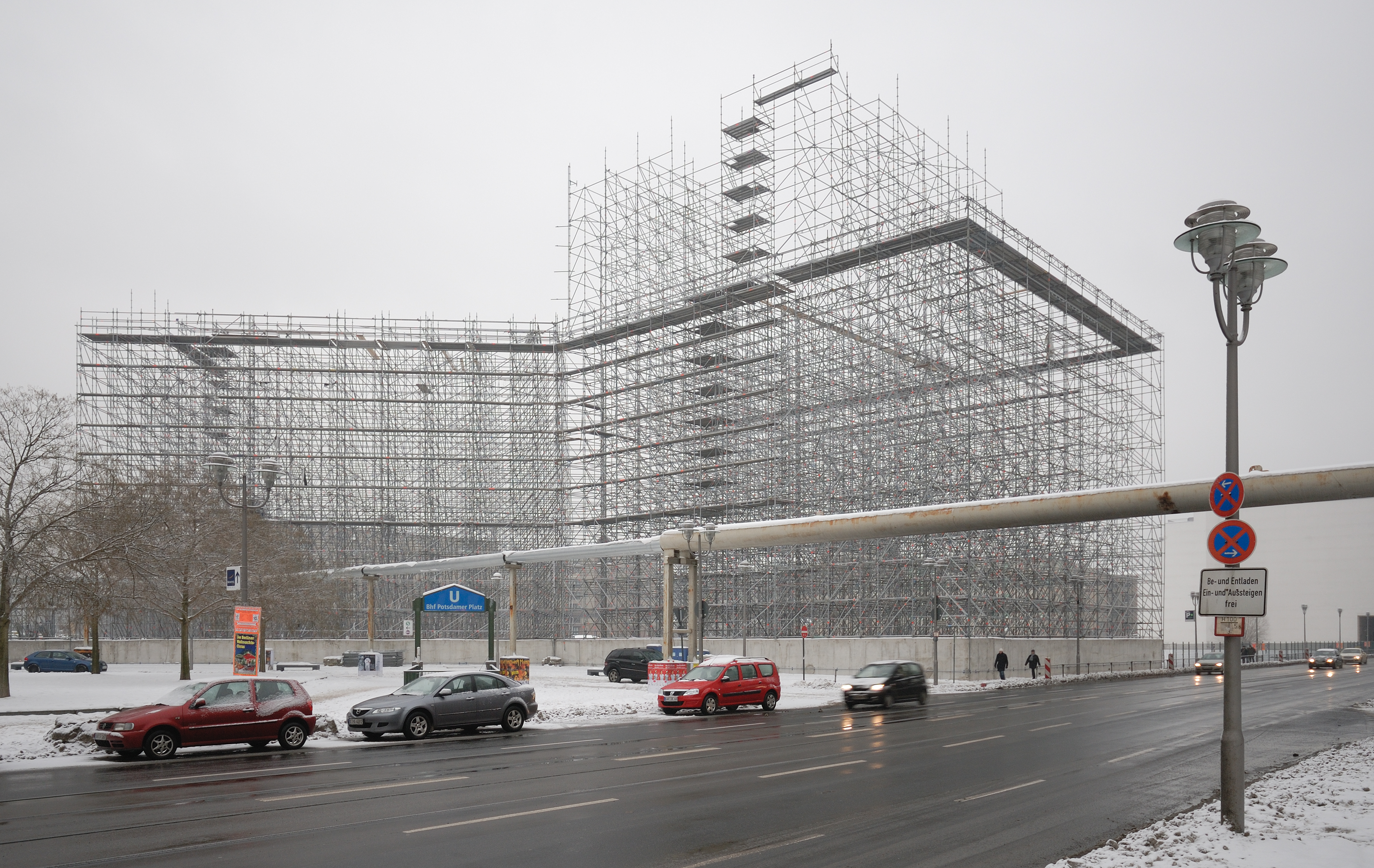
Scaffolding on the area of the former Wertheim store at Leipziger Platz in Berlin. The scaffolding was supposed to indicate the size of the new building by Kleihues + Kleihues. The financial crisis forced Orco to sell the lot to High Gain House Investments who built the LP12 Mall of Berlin

ORCO Germany S.A., with some 200 employees, and listed at the Frankfurt Stock Exchange, has been founded by Rainer Bormann and operating in Germany since 2004. Its main business areas are commercial property, asset management and project development. In 2006 ORCO Germany acquired Viterra Development and its activities and property in Berlin, Düsseldorf, Frankfurt, Hamburg and Munich. In June 2007 ORCO Germany overtook the Gewerbesiedlungs-Gesellschaft (GSG) of Berlin, as ORCO-GSG expanding its real estate managed assets to over 1 million square metres of developed and undeveloped space there, with 44 commercial areas and centres and 235 residential units.

In the beginning of 2009, ORCO owned 56.8% of ORCO Germany, which issued a statement of being "no more dependent on the ORCO Group after a successful restructuring during the last year". Shortly after in April 2009, ORCO Germany diminished slightly the personal role of Jean-François Ott, replacing him by his Ott & Co. and inviting to its board Steven Davis and Aleš Vobruba, Prague members of the ORCO Group board.

== Investment fund ==
In 2005 ORCO founded its own privately owned closed end property (fonds commun de placement - fonds d'investissement spécialisé) fund, the Endurance Real Estate Fund (Endurance Fund), with (in 2009) six sub-funds for each area and/or region of interest. It is structured (or schemed) as a regulated Luxembourg Fonds with RBC Dexia Investor Services as a custodian bank.

== Related projects ==
Złota 44 building located in Warsaw, Poland. The construction is 192m high, the tallest residential tower in Continental Europe, with 54 floors and 251 apartments. The building has been designed by the Polish architect Daniel Libeskind.

ORCO Tower located in Warsaw, Poland, built in 1995. The tower has 26 floors in 14 400 m2.

Starlight Hotel located in Budapest, Hungary. The building has 5,015 sqm with 54 rooms, rebuilt in 2000.

GSG-HOF located in Naunynstrasse 68 Berlin, Germany.

Orco Business Park located in Budaörs, Budapest, Hungary. The construction is a complex of three main buildings.

== Mamaison Collection ==
Mamaison Collection (formerly Hotels & Residences) is a collection of 9 midscale to upscale hotels and residences. The parent company is CPI Hotels, a.s.
