= Radovan Vítek =

Czech entrepreneur

- Born: 1970 or 1971 (age 54–55)
- Education: University of West Bohemia
- Occupation: Businessman
- Known for: Majority shareholder CPI Property Group
- Children: 4

Radovan Vítek (born 22 January 1971) is a Czech billionaire real estate investor, and majority shareholder in CPI Property Group, which owns a €9.8 billion property portfolio of 418 properties including offices, retail, 12,306 residential units and 10,488 hotel beds.

== Career ==
Radovan Vítek started his property career in Slovakia 1990's voucher privatization, before returning to the Czech Republic in 1997. In 1996, Vitek acquired an investment fund, Boleslavsko, which he transformed into his key real estate investment vehicle (now CPI). In the early 2000s, CPI acquired a wide portfolio of real properties and land in the Czech Republic and Slovakia. His primary focus was the quickly developing retail sector, as the Czech Republic was preparing to join the European Union in May 2004. During the economic downturn, in the absence of competitive bidders, Vitek significantly increased his investment into the office segment. In 2014, Radovan established CPIPG in its current format by the combination of CPI and GSG Group, the leading owner-operator of commercial real estate in Berlin), creating a platform that has become one of the largest CEE real estate groups.

As of September 2020, Forbes estimated his net worth at US$4.4 billion.

Through a subsidiary, Remontees Mecaniques Crans-Montana Aminona SA (CMA), CPI owns and operates ski lifts, shops, restaurants and other businesses in the Swiss ski resort of Crans Montana. During the 2018 ski season, CMA closed the ski lifts because the town council would not honor an agreement to pay 800,000 Swiss Francs (around $799,000) to CMA for the cost of late-season opening and for running World Cup races. CMA said it did this with the resort's long-term financial interest in mind. The three surrounding towns said the CMA harmed not only the resort's financial interest but also its image, and raised questions about the motivations behind their decision.

== Controversies ==
=== Fined by the Luxembourg Regulator ===
At the end of 2017, Vitek was fined by the Luxembourg regulator CSSF in relation to the acquisition of shares in Orco Property Group, alleging an “undisclosed concert action”.

=== Lawsuit in New York, US ===
In April 2019, Vitek and CPI were sued in United States District Court for the Southern District of New York for $1bn of damages. The lawsuit was filed by a New York hedge fund called Kingstown, along with Investhold LTD and Verali Limited, entities controlled by Marek Čmejla and Jiri Divis, who were previously indicted for fraud in Switzerland. The claims included alleged violations of the Racketeer Influenced and Corrupt Organizations Act (“RICO”) in the United States. The plaintiffs claim Vítek used a web of shell companies and “straw owners” to gain control of Orco Property Group and that Vitek then sold the most valuable assets at “distressed prices” to entities he secretly controlled.

CPI has stated that it sees no merit to the claims and that the lawsuit, for a headline-grabbing unsubstantiated amount, was intended to force an undue settlement through bad press about CPI and Mr. Vitek. CPI has also stated that Kingstown initiated nearly identical proceedings in Luxembourg in January 2015. In July 2019, the Luxembourg court dismissed Kingstown’s 2015 claim against Vitek’s CPI Property Group, saying in its ruling it wasn’t clear why the company should be “condemned” with the other defendants.

On 4 September 2020, the SDNY Court dismissed the claims against all defendants and directed the clerk of the court to close the case.

=== Investigation into financial deals, Switzerland ===
In 2019, reports suggested that Swiss prosecutors are investigating a capital raising by (CMA) that took place in 2016 and how the funds were used to augment its stake in a related property company of which CMA already had majority control. Philippe Magistretti, CMA’s managing director, said he had not been questioned by Valais prosecutors or even asked to discuss the matter, and that minority shareholders benefited from the transaction.

=== Revitalization of Holešovice metro station, Czech Republic ===
In September 2019 Prague Public Transit Company a.s. (DPP) announced the establishment of a joint venture with Nové Holešovice Development (NHD). The joint venture aims to revitalize the long-neglected Holešovice metro station and its surroundings. Both DPP and NHD own the affected plots in the locality. CPI of Radovan Vítek, however, began to challenge the joint venture as CPI itself is interested in acquiring the mentioned plots. The land is connected to the Bubny - Zátory area, where the land is owned by CPI. If Vítek’s CPI acquired DPP and NHD land, the second richest Czech would have complete control over the vast area of the wider center of Prague.

== Personal life ==
Vítek is married, with four children, and lives in Switzerland. In May 2015, he bought Rydinghurst, a 17th-century house and 200-acre estate in Surrey, England from British rock star Ringo Starr for £13.5 million, so that his children can be educated in England.
