= Petr Kellner =

Czech businessman (1964–2021)

- Born: 20 May 1964; Česká Lípa, Czechoslovakia (now Czech Republic)
- Died: 27 March 2021 (aged 56) near Knik Glacier, Alaska, U.S.
- Education: University of Economics, Prague
- Occupations: Founder and majority shareholder, PPF Group
- Spouse(s): Iva Kellnerová (divorced); Renáta Kellnerová
- Children: 4, including Anna Kellnerová

Petr Kellner (20 May 1964 – 27 March 2021) was a Czech entrepreneur, the founder and majority shareholder (98.93%) of the PPF Group. At the time of his death, he had an estimated net worth of $17.5 billion, making him the wealthiest person in the Czech Republic.

== Early life ==
Kellner was born in 1964 in Česká Lípa, then in Czechoslovakia, but spent most of his childhood in Liberec. Kellner graduated from the University of Economics, Prague Faculty of Industrial Economics, in 1986.

== Career ==
In the late 1980s, he worked as a production assistant in Barrandov Studios, even having a cameo in the 1989 film Time of the Servants.

After the Velvet Revolution he worked for the Czech company Impromat, an importer and seller of Ricoh photocopiers. While working for that company, he met Milan Maděryč and Milan Vinkler.

=== Investment fund PPF ===
In 1991, after the announcement of Czechoslovak voucher privatization, he founded the investment fund PPF (První Privatizační Fond: First Privatization Fund) with Milan Vinkler and state-owned glassworks Sklo Union. In 1992, PPF investiční společnost a.s. was established and the funds' names were changed from privatization to investment. The funds were very successful and purchased stock of more than 200 corporations with nominal value 5 billion CZK.

=== Česká pojišťovna ===
In 1995 and 1996, PPF bought a 20% stake in the largest Czech insurance company, Česká pojišťovna and started to manage it. In 2000, PPF bought 31.5% stake of Česká pojišťovna from IPB for 2.85 billion CZK (around $72.27 million at the time). The transaction with IPB ended up with IPB paying to PPF 1.6 billion CZK (around $40.93 million at the time) penalty, making the real purchasing cost of the stake 1.25 billion CZK (around $31.98 million at the time). Later PPF acquired more shares and became the dominant (93%) owner in 2001, when PPF bought large stakes of shares from Komerční banka and the Czech state. With help of these profitable transactions, the last investors from voucher privatization were bought out and Kellner became the dominant owner of PPF Group.

=== Assicurazioni Generali ===
In 2007, PPF Group signed a contract with Assicurazioni Generali to create a joint venture between PPF Group's insurance arm and Assicurazioni Generali's corporations in the Czech Republic, Slovakia, Poland, Hungary, Romania, Bulgaria, Ukraine, Russia, Serbia, Slovenia, Croatia, Belarus, and Kazakhstan. According to sources PPF Group will own 49% of that company from the start, and Generali will pay €1.1 billion (around $1.29 billion at the time) to the PPF Group for its stake. From 2007 till 2013 Kellner was member of the board of directors of Generali. Kellner himself later bought 2.02% stake in Assicurazioni Generali.

In 2013 Kellner's PPF sold their remaining shares in the Generali PPF Holding (GPH) to Generali for €2.5 billion (around $3.32 billion at the time), who became sole owner effective in early 2015.

=== Central European Media Enterprises ===
In early September 2007, Ronald Lauder announced that Kellner held a 3% stake and was on the board of directors of Central European Media Enterprises. In 2019 PPF Group acquired whole CME.

=== Hotel Praha ===
In 2013, Kellner purchased the Hotel Praha, a luxury hotel in the Dejvice section of Prague that had been built under Communist rule. Kellner demolished the hotel in 2014 and sought to turn the land into a campus of Open Gate, an elite private school he had founded. The school was never built.

=== Relations with politicians ===
PPF Group has often operated in state-regulated business (insurance, banking, telecommunications), so intermingling with the politics was inherent. Three politicians are clearly linked to Kellner. The first is Václav Klaus, firstly the Czechoslovak Minister of Finance during times of voucher privatization, later Prime Minister and Czech president. After he retired from active politics in 2013, his Václav Klaus Institute was funded by PPF banka from PPF Group. The second is Ivan Kočárník, who served as Czech Minister of Finance from 1992 to 1997, during the privatization of Česká pojišt'ovna into the hands of PPF Group. After he retired from active politics in 1997, he was a member of the board of directors from 1997 to 2000 of Česká pojišt'ovna and a member of its supervisory board from 2000 to 2007. The third is Kellner's top lobbyist Vladimír Mlynář, the first Czech Minister of Informatics, who works for PPF Group since 2010.

== Wealth ==
As of 2013, Kellner owned 98.93% of the PPF investment and financial group.

In 2006, he was first time listed in Forbes list of billionaires with estimated net worth at US$3 billion and as 224th wealthiest man in the world. In 2007, he was 119th with US$6 billion; in 2008 he was 91st with US$9.3 billion. In 2009, he was 76th with US$6 billion. In 2010 he was 89th with US$7.6 billion; according to the Czech weekly Týden, the estimates were lower, however, approx. US$4 billion.

In 2015, Kellner ranked #137 on the Forbes list with an estimated wealth of US$9.2 billion (2015). In August 2016, he ranked #102 with US$11.4 billion, making him the wealthiest person in the Czech Republic. In 2018, Kellner ranked #88, with US$15.5 billion. In 2020 he ranked #68 with US$14.9 billion. In October 2020, Czech Forbes listed him as the richest person in the Czech Republic with net worth 293 billion CZK (around US$13 billion at the time).

In 2010 he bought a Boeing 737-700 BBJ1 as his business airplane. It was registered P4-NGK and was operated by ABS Jets. After his death in 2021, the 737 was used to repatriate his body back to the Czech Republic. His home was in an extensive residence, in the village of Podkozí near Prague. He also owned a number of other properties in several countries. He possessed one of the largest collections of photographs taken by Josef Sudek who was best known for his neo-romantic photography.

He was an avid fan of the Jára Cimrman plays, as a result, PPF Group is a sponsor of Jára Cimrman Theatre since 1999.

== Death ==
Approximate location of the accident, Knik Glacier (Alaska)

Kellner died on 27 March 2021 in an Airbus AS350 B3 helicopter crash, while heliskiing in Alaska's backcountry near Knik Glacier, 50 miles (80 km) east of Anchorage, along with four other people. The helicopter crashed into a mountain between Metal Creek and Grasshopper Valley at about 5,500 feet (1,700 m), 10 or 15 feet (3 or 4 m) from the top of the ridge, and rolled some 800 or 900 feet (240 or 270 m) downhill. The missing helicopter was reported to the authorities two hours after the tracking signal stopped. According to the preliminary report, GPS data show the helicopter hovered at a low altitude and speed (about one knot, about 1 mph), maneuvering over the ridge in the last three minutes of the flight. It crashed at about 18:35 AKDT.

== See also ==
- The Kellner Family Foundation
