= Babice (Prague-East District) =

- Municipality
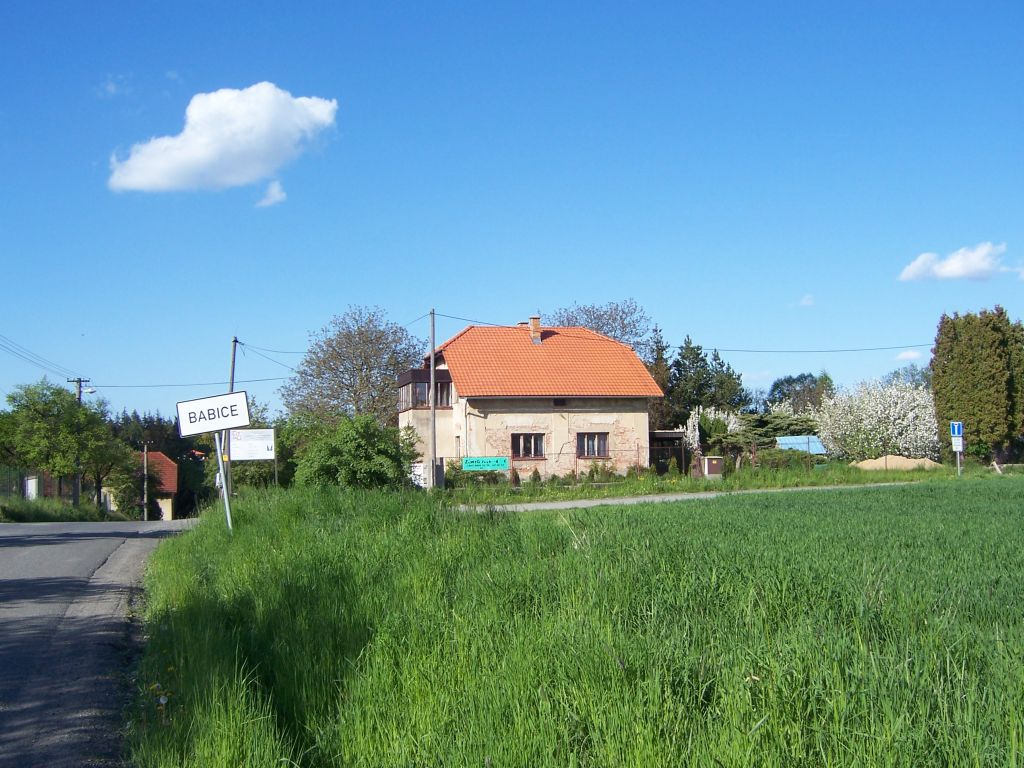
- Road to Babice

- Flag Coat of arms

- Location in the Czech Republic
- Coordinates: 50°0′23″N 14°42′56″E
- Country: Czech Republic
- Region: Central Bohemian
- District: Prague-East
- First mentioned: 1381

Area
  - Total: 5.57 km^{2} (2.15 sq mi)
- Elevation: 384 m (1,260 ft)

Population (2026-01-01)
  - Total: 1,529
  - Density: 275/km^{2} (711/sq mi)
- Time zone: UTC+1 (CET)
  - Summer (DST): UTC+2 (CEST)
- Postal code: 251 01
- Website: babiceurican.cz

Babice is a municipality and village in Prague-East District in the Central Bohemian Region of the Czech Republic. It has about 1,500 inhabitants.

== Etymology ==
The name is derived from the surname Bába, meaning "the village of Bába's people".

== Geography ==
Babice is located about 15 kilometres (9 mi) east of Prague. It lies in the Benešov Uplands. The Výmola Stream flows through the municipality and supplies a system of fishponds south of the village.

== History ==
The first written mention of Babice is from 1381.

== Demographics ==
Historical population

Year	Pop.	±%
1869	452	—
1880	471	+4.2%
1890	462	−1.9%
1900	394	−14.7%
1910	437	+10.9%

Year	Pop.	±%
1921	444	+1.6%
1930	391	−11.9%
1950	361	−7.7%
1961	348	−3.6%
1970	288	−17.2%

Year	Pop.	±%
1980	236	−18.1%
1991	186	−21.2%
2001	264	+41.9%
2011	843	+219.3%
2021	1,415	+67.9%

Source: Censuses

== Transport ==
There are no railways or major roads passing through the municipality.

== Sights ==
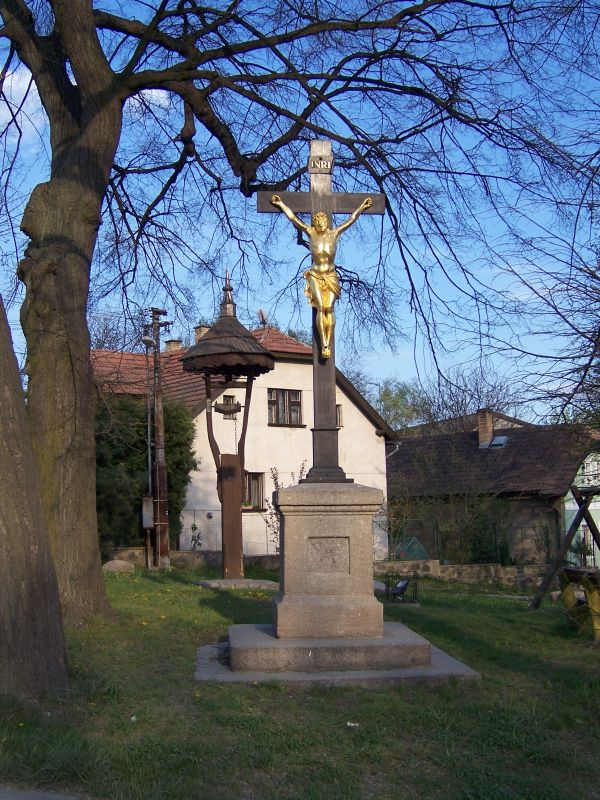
Centre of Babice

The only protected cultural monument in the municipality is an archaeological site where the medieval village of Janovičky stood. Historical landmarks in the centre of the village are a small wooden belfry and a crucifix.
