= The Kellner Family Foundation =

Czech charitable organization

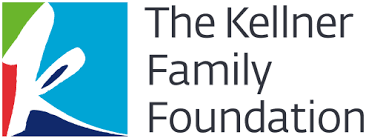
- Founded: 2009
- Founders: Renáta Kellnerová; Petr Kellner
- Location: Prague, Czech Republic
- Chairwoman of the Board of Trustees: Renáta Kellnerová
- Executive director: Tereza Bůžková
- Website: www.kellnerfoundation.cz/en/

The Kellner Family Foundation is a Czech charitable foundation established in 2009 by businessman Petr Kellner and his wife Renáta Kellnerová. It focuses primarily on education in the Czech Republic, providing scholarships to students of Open Gate, grants to Czech university students studying in the Czech Republic and abroad, and support for public primary schools through the Helping Schools Succeed programme. In 2026, the foundation expanded its activities with an early-childhood programme aimed at children from disadvantaged backgrounds.

== History ==
Renáta and Petr Kellner established the Educa Foundation in 2002, initially focusing on educational support, including scholarships for students at Open Gate, which opened in 2005. The Kellner Family Foundation was established separately in 2009.

In 2010, the foundation donated CZK 9 million to four municipalities affected by flooding in the Liberec Region. In May 2011, Educa was merged into The Kellner Family Foundation, consolidating the Kellners' philanthropic activities under a single foundation. The combined foundation continued to focus primarily on education, including the Open Gate, Universities and Helping Schools Succeed programmes.

== Activities ==
The foundation focuses primarily on education in the Czech Republic. Its long-term programmes provide scholarships to students at Open Gate, grants to Czech students studying at universities abroad, and support for public primary schools through the Helping Schools Succeed programme. In 2026, it expanded its educational activities to early childhood through the Early Care programme, which supports children from socially disadvantaged backgrounds before they enter school. Outside its core educational programmes, the foundation has also supported scientific research, humanitarian assistance and other charitable initiatives.

=== Educational programmes ===
Universities

Universities is a scholarship programme established in 2009 that supports Czech students pursuing bachelor's degrees at universities abroad. Scholarship recipients have studied at institutions including the University of Oxford, University of Cambridge, ETH Zurich, Technical University of Munich and universities in the Netherlands, Ireland and the United States. The grants contribute towards tuition fees and living expenses, including accommodation, books and travel. Former Open Gate scholarship recipients may also apply for support to study at universities in the Czech Republic.

Since 2009, the foundation has supported 313 university students, providing approximately CZK 189 million in grants. In the 2026/27 academic year, it supported 62 students, including 28 new recipients.

Helping Schools Succeed

Helping Schools Succeed is a programme supporting public primary schools in the Czech Republic. Launched in 2010, it provides long-term professional support to teachers and school leaders, including pedagogical consulting, teacher collaboration and professional development. The programme focuses particularly on developing pupils' reading, writing and critical literacy, with teachers working together within schools and in regional networks to develop and evaluate teaching practices.

In the 2025/26 school year, Helping Schools Succeed involved 170 public primary schools across the Czech Republic, representing approximately 5,000 teachers and up to 60,000 pupils. The foundation provided CZK 40.3 million to the programme in 2025 and had contributed approximately CZK 530 million to it since its establishment.

Early Care

Early Care is an early-childhood programme launched in 2026 to support children from disadvantaged backgrounds before they enter school. The three-year pilot is being implemented in Cheb, Litvínov and Most, where trained community workers visit families and support children's language, cognitive and social development, as well as their transition into kindergarten. The foundation allocated CZK 40 million to the pilot, with field implementation scheduled to begin by 2027.

=== Other grants and initiatives ===
Beginning in 2013, the foundation supported research into the biology of cancer through its Science programme. In a two-round selection process, three projects were chosen from 59 applications for four- or five-year grants: a Charles University team led by Jan Brábek studying cancer-cell invasiveness; a team led by Jaroslav Truksa at the Institute of Biotechnology of the Czech Academy of Sciences studying drug resistance in tumour-initiating cells; and a team led by Jiří Bartek at Palacký University Olomouc studying genome integrity and personalised treatment of prostate cancer. The foundation budgeted approximately CZK 38 million for the three grants over five years.

In 2023, the foundation agreed to provide CZK 500 million for the construction and subsequent research activities of a scientific and diagnostic oncology centre at Motol University Hospital in Prague. The foundation terminated the donation agreement in March 2025 following a police investigation into alleged corruption connected with the hospital and the construction project, while stating that it remained open to renewing its support if the circumstances were clarified.

The foundation has also provided emergency and humanitarian assistance. Following the 2024 Central European floods, it contributed CZK 50 million to relief efforts in the Czech Republic and €2 million each to affected regions in Poland and Slovakia. In 2026, Renáta Kellnerová and her daughters provided CZK 170 million through the foundation to the Olena Zelenska Foundation for humanitarian assistance and energy infrastructure supporting Ukrainian children, families, schools, hospitals and other social institutions.

In January 2026, the foundation and Charles University announced the Kellner Research Chairs programme, intended to recruit internationally established researchers to the university, including Czech researchers returning from abroad. The foundation committed up to CZK 48 million to support as many as six senior researchers for three years each.
