= CPI Property Group =

Real Estate Company

- Type: S.A.
- Traded as: FWB: O5G
- ISIN: LU0251710041
- Industry: Real estate
- Founded: 1991
- Headquarters: Luxembourg City, Luxembourg
- Area served: Czech Republic; Germany; Poland; Hungary; Italy; Other CEE; Western Europe
- Key people: CEO David Greenbaum; COO Zdeněk Havelka; CFO Pavel Měchura
- Revenue: ▼€1,426 million (2025); €1,627 million (2024)
- Operating income: ▼€703 million (2025); €747 million (2024)
- Net income: ▲€254 million (2025); €(197) million (2024)
- Total assets: ▼€20,220 million (2025); €20,564 million (2024)
- Owner: Radovan Vítek (87.15%)
- Number of employees: 2,138 (2025)
- Subsidiaries: CPI Europe AG; S IMMO AG; CPI FIM S.A.; Czech Property Investments, a.s.
- Website: cpipg.com

CPI Property Group (CPIPG) is a real estate landlord of commercial property focused on the Czech Republic, Berlin, Warsaw and the Central & Eastern European (CEE) region. It was founded in the Czech Republic in 1991.

The company's headquarters are in Luxembourg, and its shares are listed on the Frankfurt Stock Exchange.

Radovan Vítek is the founder and majority shareholder of the company, holding approximately 89.29% of CPIPG's voting rights directly and through vehicles controlled by him. Clerius Properties (affiliate of Apollo Funds) owing 5.58%.

CPIPG's owned real estate portfolio is valued at €18.6 billion (as at 30 June 2024), comprising more than 600 commercial properties, over 8,000 international and local tenants, and exposure to multiple geographies and property segments. CPIPG’s portfolio is split as follows: office assets (46% of the total portfolio by value), primarily in central European capital cities such as Berlin (GSG Berlin) Prague, Warsaw, Bucharest and Budapest; retail assets (26%), primarily in the Czech Republic; residential assets (7%), mainly in the Czech Republic; hotels and resorts (5%); and complementary assets (16%), primarily comprising land bank, development properties and industrial and logistics properties. CPIPG's properties generated over €796 million of net rental income the full year ended 31 December 2023, up 25.9% up from the previous year, net business income rose to €874 million. As at the end of H1 2024, properties had high occupancy rate of 91.3%.

In November 2023, CPI Property Group appointed David Greenbaum, CFO of the Group since 2018, to CEO and managing director and was co-opted to CPIPG’s board of directors.

CPIPG's board of directors consists of three independent directors (Edward Hughes, Omar Sattar, and Jonathan Lewis), two non-executive members (Philippe Magistretti, Tim Scoble as Apollo representative) and three members of management (David Greenbaum, Tomas Salajka, and Oliver Schlink).

CPIPG has issued more than €8.7 billion (equivalent) of bonds in eight different currencies on the international capital markets.

== History ==
The company's history dates back to the foundation of Czech Property Investments a.s. (CPI a.s.) in 1991. Throughout the 1990s the company expanded its business abroad through acquisitions in Central Eastern Europe, across multiple real estate segments, including the acquisition of a residential portfolio in the Czech Republic in 2003.

In 2013, CPI a.s. acquired ABLON Group Limited, which owned a significant property portfolio in the CEE region. In 2014, CPI a.s. combined with Orco Property Group, the majority owner of Orco Germany, which owned a portfolio of office properties in Berlin. Following the company's name change to GSG Group, the company was renamed again to CPI Property Group.

== Key historical milestones ==
- Founded in 1991 as CPI a.s.
- 1999 - Start of residential portfolio acquisitions
- 2002 - Issuance of bonds in the Czech Republic. CPI a.s. moves to the forefront of the most significant Czech real estate investors
- 2003 - Residential portfolio expansion through purchase of residential assets which today comprise CPI BYTY's portfolio
- 2013 - International expansion with the acquisition of ABLON Group, which owned
- a significant property portfolio in the CEE region
- 2014 - Integration of CPI a.s. and GSG and establishment of CPIPG. This step created an extraordinarily strong Luxembourg-based European property group with a diversified portfolio in the Czech Republic, Berlin and the CEE region
- 2016 - Local bond leader with the active issuance in local bond markets to capture strong credit appetite, further enhancing our funding profile
- 2017 - Acquisition of retail portfolio from CBRE Global Investors
- 2018-2019 - Capital structure transformation - Hybrid bonds, senior unsecured bonds in EUR, CHF, JPY, HKD and USD; inaugural green bond
- 2019-2020 - Office expansion in Warsaw and CEE creating a leading position in Warsaw office market; acquisition of a 29.6% stake acquired in Globalworth.
- 2020 - Green bond champion with four green bonds issued in three currencies
- 2021-2022 - CPIPG revises its environmental strategy and increased ambition for GHG intensity reduction target of 30% (2021) and to 32.4% (2022), which is validated by SBTi.
- 2022 - A €20 billion+ European market leader, CPIPG’s portfolio is transformed through the acquisitions of controlling stakes of IMMOFINANZ and S IMMO. That same year, CPIPG issues inaugural Sustainability-Linked Bond.
- 2022-2024 - Portfolio optimisation and leverage reduction with the disposal of mainly lower-yielding assets with €2 billion target achieved.
- 2024 – Issued €500 million of bonds in May after a two-year absence from the market; transaction received €3 billion of demand and issued €700 million of bonds in with an orderbook of €4.6 billion in September.
- Minority equity investment of €250 million by Sona Asset Management for a 49% stake in a subsidiary consisting of 11 office properties in Warsaw and two retail assets in Elbląg and Lublin, Poland.
