= PPF (company) =

Financial group

PPF Group
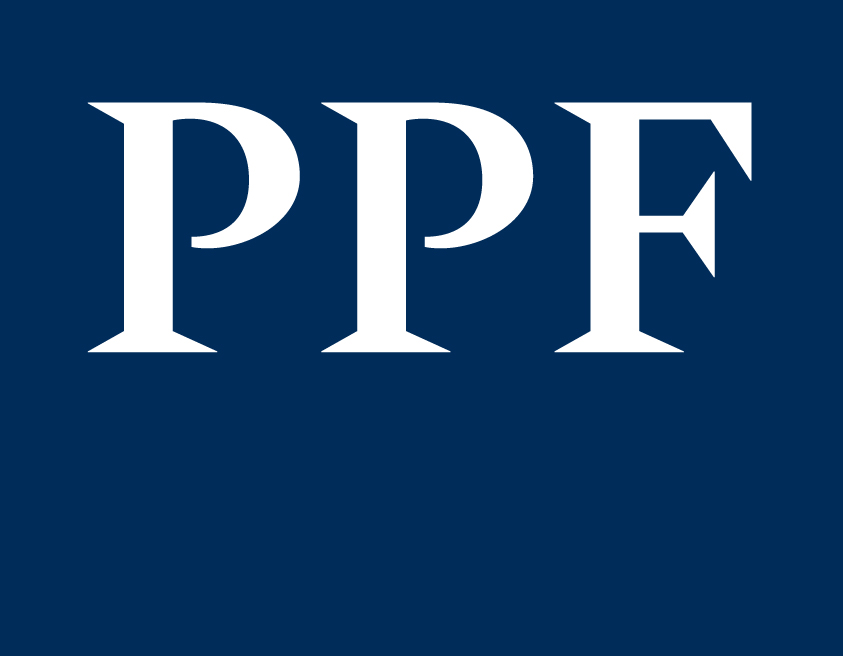
- Type: Private
- Industry: Investment group
- Founded: February 2 1991; 35 years ago
- Founder: Petr Kellner
- Headquarters: Prague, Czech Republic
- Area served: 25 countries across Europe, Asia and North America
- Key people: Kateřina Jirásková (co-CEO); Didier Stoessel (co-CEO)
- Revenue: €7.01 billion (2025)
- Operating income: 3,043,000,000 (2024)
- Net income: €692 million (2025)
- Total assets: €42.617 billion (2025)
- Total equity: €11.752 billion (2025)
- Owner: Renáta Kellnerová and her daughters (through Amalar Holding)
- Number of employees: c. 37,000 (average, 2025)
- Website: www.ppf.eu

PPF Group is a privately held Czech investment group headquartered in Prague. Its businesses include banking and other financial services, telecommunications, media, e-commerce, real estate, engineering and biotechnology, with operations in 25 countries across Europe, Asia and North America. Its major holdings include Air Bank, telecommunications companies O2 Czech Republic and CETIN, media group CME and transport engineering company Škoda Group. As of 31 December 2025, the group had consolidated assets of €42.617 billion.

The group traces its origins to a privatisation fund established in 1991 by Petr Kellner and partners during Czechoslovakia's voucher privatisation programme. Kellner remained its controlling shareholder until his death in March 2021, after which his shareholding passed to his heirs. Since October 2025, PPF has been wholly owned through Amalar Holding by Kellner's widow, Renáta Kellnerová, and her three daughters.

Kateřina Jirásková and Didier Stoessel have served as co-chief executives since July 2025. In April 2026, the group’s parent company moved its registered office from the Netherlands to the Czech Republic and changed its name from PPF Group N.V. to PPF Group a.s.

== History ==
The history of PPF dates back to the early 1990s. After the 1989 Velvet Revolution in what was then Czechoslovakia, the federal government led by prime minister Marián Čalfa decided to gradually privatise state-owned companies. A legal framework for privatisation was set down in Act No. 92/1991 passed on 26 February 1991. One of the agreed privatisation methods was voucher privatisation. Czechoslovak citizens who decided to take part in the voucher privatisation scheme had two options, to use their vouchers to either personally bid for shares in companies to be privatised or to exchange them for shares in privatisation funds, whose managers would then make the investment decisions.

In September 1991 PPF was founded as a Teplice-based company called Správa prvního privatizačního fondu (lit. 'Management of the First Privatisation Fund'). Its registered capital was CSK 100,000 ($3,300; equivalent to $7,801 in 2025). Petr Kellner became its chairman, and the other board members were managing director Milan Vinkler and Petr Joudal. All of three were already entrepreneurs. In February 1991 Kellner founded the company ANO with Joudal and the company WIKA with Vinkler.

To succeed in privatisation, PPF needed money for an advertising campaign, which it obtained from state-owned glassworks Sklo Union, also based in Teplice. Štěpán Popovič, board member of Sklo Union, formally introduced Kellner to the board, which in turn approved a CSK 20 million investment in the form of a capital increase and debt financing. In November 1991 the registered capital of PPF was increased to CSK 6.6 million ($226,000) and Joudal was replaced by Jaroslav Přerost, who was at the time CFO of Sklo Union.

In December 1991 PPF set up five investment funds:

Name of the fund	Registered office	Board members (chairman first)
First Bohemian Privatisation Fund	Teplice	Přemysl Voráč, Petr Joudal, Ladislav Bartoníček
First Moravian-Silesian Privatisation Fund	Zlín	Petr Kellner, Radomír Zbožínek, Jiří Cajthaml
First North-Bohemian Privatisation Fund	Teplice	Petr Kellner, Milan Vinkler, Vladimír Klebsa
First South-Bohemian Privatisation Fund	České Budějovice	Vladimír Sochor, Radomír Zbožínek, Milan Skoumal
Regional Investment Fund	Liberec	Jiří Drda, Ladislav Bartoníček, Milan Vinkler

The registered capital of each fund was CSK 100,000 ($3,300). PPF did not establish a fund focused on Slovakia.

=== 1992–2000 ===
In March 1992 the registered name of the management company was shortened to První privatizační fond (First Privatisation Fund), a month later an extraordinary general meeting elected Popovič to its board.

Following the advertising campaign at the outset of the first wave of voucher privatisation, PPF funds gathered 1.4% of all investment points and PPF became the eleventh-largest management company in terms of acquired privatisation points. In the second wave, which took place after the dissolution of Czechoslovakia on 31 December 1992, PPF funds gathered 2.1% of all investment points (ninth-largest group).

In 1994 shareholders of the four largest funds from the first wave agreed a merger, the smallest Regional Investment Fund was later liquidated. In 1996 the merged fund acquired a 20% stake in Česká pojišťovna (ČP), the largest Czech insurance company. ČP had a profitable insurance business, however its two subsidiary banks were losing billions of Czech crowns, decreasing the ownership equity of ČP.

On 17 June 1996 the first wave fund was transformed to a standard holding corporation (PPF IH). The transformation took place just two weeks before 1 July 1996, when the Act No. 142/1996 made the transition to a standard corporation much more complicated. As a result, PPF IH was no longer subject to the regulation of investment funds. To push the transformation through, PPF used cross-shareholdings. For example, the industrial company TMP, in which PPF was the largest shareholder, acquired in March 1996 shares of the fund, only to sell them for a lower price after the extraordinary general meeting losing CZK 96 million ($2.5 million).

On 19 June 1996 the Minister of Finance Ivan Kočárník hosted a key meeting of ČP shareholders, the state's National Property Fund (NPF), PPF, and three banks, IPB, ČSOB and KB. NPF, which held a 30% stake in ČP, was represented by the Minister of Privatization Roman Češka (of the party ODA), the governor of the Czech National Bank, Josef Tošovský was also present. It was agreed that PPF should manage ČP, and IPB would manage its ailing subsidiary banks. PPF and IPB also got an option to purchase ČSOB shares, subject to the condition that the audited ČP profit for 1997 was positive. In 1998 PPF and IPB exercised that option and the state lost its majority in ČP (the state was the largest shareholder in ČSOB and KB banks).

On 21 March 2000, Libor Procházka (IPB) agreed with Petr Kellner to sell ČP shares controlled by IPB to the Dutch-based company CESPO. The contractual penalty amounted to 75% of the purchase price (CZK 1.6 billion). IPB transferred the shares too late and therefore CESPO paid only 25% of the agreed price. As a result, PPF had a majority interest in ČP. IPB went into forced administration in June 2000 and was sold to ČSOB. ČSOB later took PPF to the court, claiming the price of ČP shares was too low, it lost the case.

In September 2000 the registered capital of PPF IH was decreased by 90% and CZK 1.77 billion ($45 million) was distributed among its shareholders (CZK 500 per share, meaning CZK 15,000 per voucher book).

=== 2000–present ===
Jiří Šmejc became a shareholder of PPF Group N.V., registered in the Netherlands in 2005, acquiring a 5% share, with Ladislav Bartoníček and Jean-Pascal Duvieusart later becoming the remaining two shareholders.

PPF Group bought TV Nova, the first private TV station in the Czech Republic, in 2002. Then in 2005, after stabilising TV Nova, the group sold TV Nova to the media group CME, and later agreed with CME to buy the station back in 2019.

In 2008, PPF Group and Italian Generali founded an insurance holding company, into which they placed their insurance assets. As of 2013, the Group owned assets worth EUR 22.113 billion, including various assets from banking and insurance to real estate, energy, agriculture and the biggest Russian electronics consumer chain, Eldorado.

Along with J&T and Daniel Křetínský, PPF Group founded (Energetický a průmyslový holding - Energy & Industrial Holding) in 2009. This was a vehicle to invest in the energy and industry sector. PPF Group held a 40% share in the company. In August 2012 PPF Group converted part of its debt for EPH shares and increased its share to 44.4%. In June 2014 PPF Group sold its stake for EUR 1.1 billion.

In 2011, along with another Czech billionaire Karel Komárek (KKCG), the group acquired control of the Czech lottery company Sazka. Working together, both companies were able to stabilise Sazka and help it to recover. In October 2012, PPF Group sold its 50% share in Sazka to KKCG.

In 2011 PPF Group founded a new bank in 2011 called - Air Bank, specialising in online banking. Then, towards the end of 2012, SOTIO became a member of PPF Group. SOTIO is a biotechnology company developing new Active Cellular Immunotherapy ("ACI") for the treatment of cancer and autoimmune diseases.

In 2013 Jiří Šmejc sold his 5% share in PPF Group to Petr Kellner. As part of the transaction Mr Smejc acquired a 13,4% share in Home Credit N.V. and Air Bank.

In November 2013, PPF Group acquired a 66% share in the Czech telecommunications company Telefónica O2 Czech Republic for 63,6 billion CZK ($3.2 billion). In August 2015 the general shareholders meeting authorized the division of the company into O2 – a mobile service provider, and CETIN, a telecommunications infrastructure and network company.

In March 2018, PPF Group agreed to buy Telenor's operations in Southeast Europe, namely Bulgaria (Telenor Bulgaria), Hungary (Telenor Hungary, Telenor Common Operation), Montenegro (Telenor Montenegro) and Serbia (Telenor Serbia) for a sum of EUR 2.8 billion.

In September 2019, PPF Group acquired a 19.2% stake in biopharmaceutical firm Autolus Therapeutics, making it the company's biggest shareholder. In October 2019, AT&T agreed to sell its stake in broadcasting company Central European Media Enterprises (CME) to PPF.

In May 2022, Renáta Kellnerová announced the appointment of Jiří Šmejc as the Group's Chief Executive Officer, who assumed his post on 15 June 2022.

== Holdings ==
PPF operates across several business sectors. The following list includes respective segment's revenue in 2025:

=== Controlled businesses ===
- Financial services (€2.049 billion): PPF Financial Holdings a.s., including Air Bank, Home Credit, PPF banka, Yettel Bank and EmbedIT
- Telecommunications (€1.941 billion): O2 Czech Republic and CETIN Czech Republic
- Mobility and mechanical engineering (€1.211 billion): Škoda Group, in which PPF has an 80% interest
- Media (€987 million): Central European Media Enterprises (CME)
- Leisure and entertainment (€406 million): Bestsport (which operates Prague's O2 Arena) and Blue Sea Holding
- Other businesses (€212 million): ITIS Holding, SOTIO Biotech, SCT Cell Manufacturing, Cytune Pharma
- Real estate (€201 million): PPF Real Estate Holding

=== Joint ventures and minority investments ===
Revenue from associates and joint ventures is not included in PPF's consolidated revenue. As at 31 December 2025, its significant non-controlling investments included:

- 50% minus one share in e& PPF Telecom Group
- 50% of Heureka Group and CE Electronics Holding, the latter of which owns FAST ČR
- an effective 40% interest in TEMSA, jointly controlled by Škoda Group and Sabancı Holding
- 35.86% of ClearBank
- 29.94% of MONETA Money Bank
- 29.29% of Viaplay Group
- 28.78% of InPost

== Philanthropic activities ==
Since 2019, most of the PPF Group's philanthropic activities have been united in the PPF Foundation, which supports science and education, the arts and care for Czech cultural heritage, civil society, community development and children's sports. In 2021, PPF Foundation supported 31 projects, to which it distributed more than CZK 55 million.

PPF supports some projects in cooperation with The Kellner Family Foundation. This foundation focuses on improving the quality of education in public primary schools in the Czech Republic, supports socially disadvantaged students at the Open Gate - Grammar and Primary School in Babice, and provides grants to Czech students to study at international universities. Since its foundation, The Kellner Family Foundation has given CZK 1.6 billion in support of educational activities in the Czech Republic.

Through its subsidiary PPF Art, PPF manages the collection of Czechoslovak and Czech photography, one of the largest private collections in the Czech Republic. PPF Art also runs two Prague galleries, The Josef Sudek Studio and Václav Špála Gallery, contributes to the operation of the Jára Cimrman Theatre in Prague, and supports the Summer Shakespeare Festival.

== See also ==
- Emma Capital – an investment management company founded by PPF former shareholder Jiří Šmejc
