= Eurocopter AS350 Écureuil =

Single engine series of the Ecureuil light helicopter family

AS350 Écureuil/AStar H125
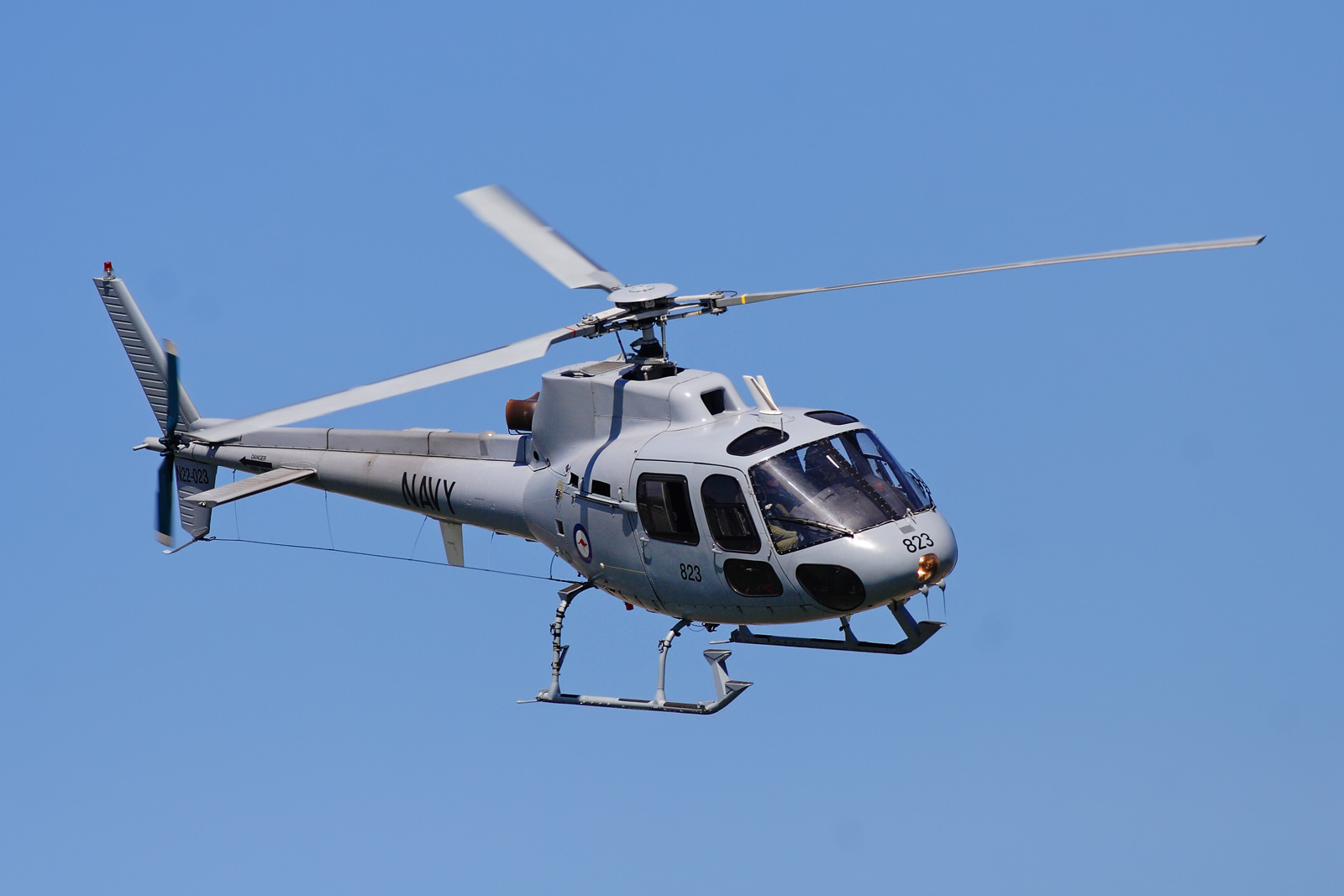
- An AS350BA Squirrel of the Royal Australian Navy Fleet Air Arm at the 2008 Australian Grand Prix

General information
- Type: Light utility helicopter
- National origin: France
- Manufacturer: Aérospatiale; Eurocopter; Airbus Helicopters; Helibras; Tata Advanced Systems (future)
- Status: In service
- Primary users: Brazilian Air Force Pakistan Army Aviation; Royal Jordanian Air Force
- Number built: 7,200 (for the Écureuil family); 3,590 (AS350/AS550: 2009)

History
- Manufactured: Since 1975
- Introduction date: 1975
- First flight: 27 June 1974
- Variants: Eurocopter AS550 Fennec; Eurocopter AS355 Écureuil 2
- Developed into: Changhe Z-11; Eurocopter EC130

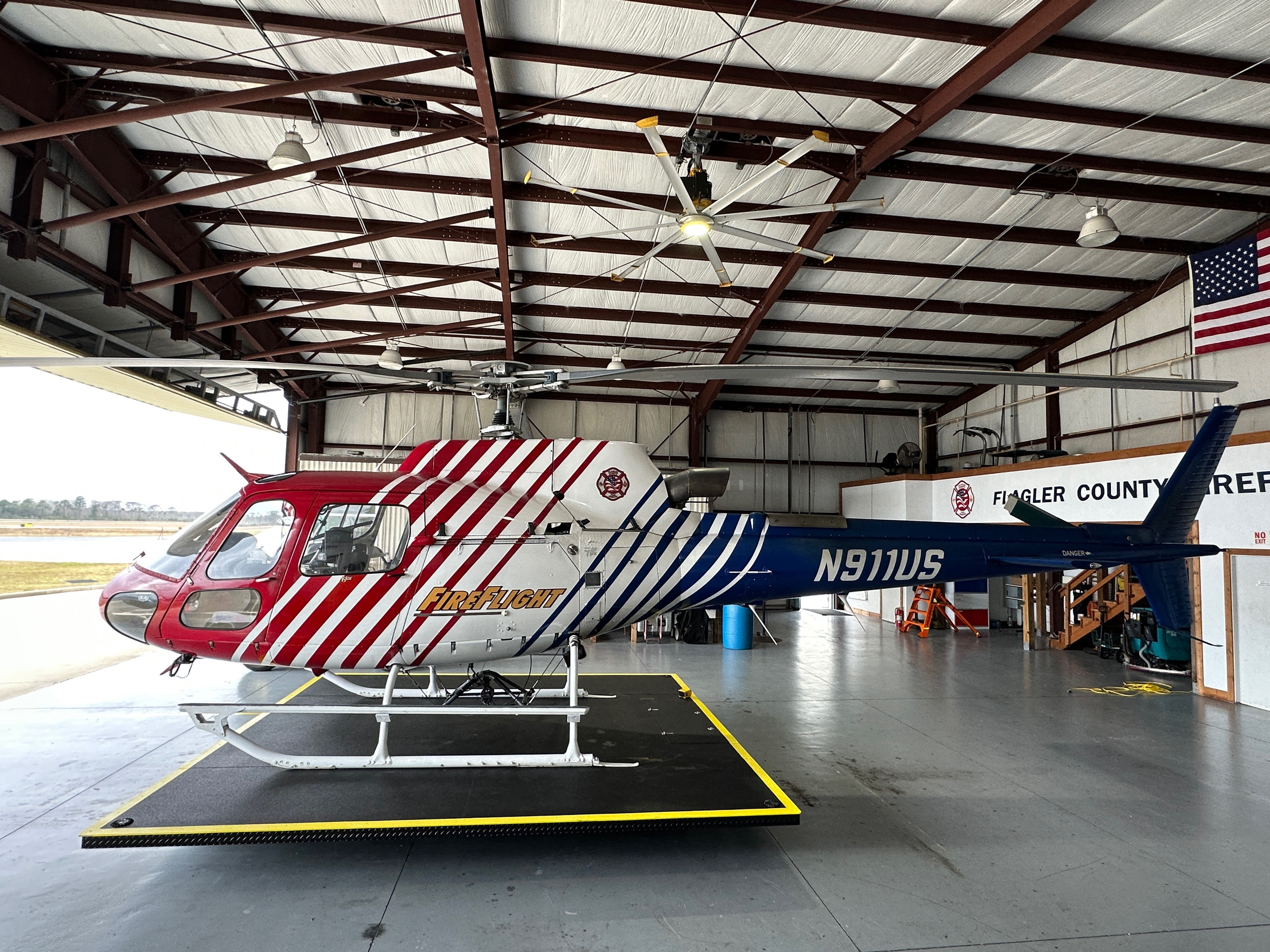
Flagler County Fire Rescue's FIREFLIGHT. The first AS350 B3 in North America.

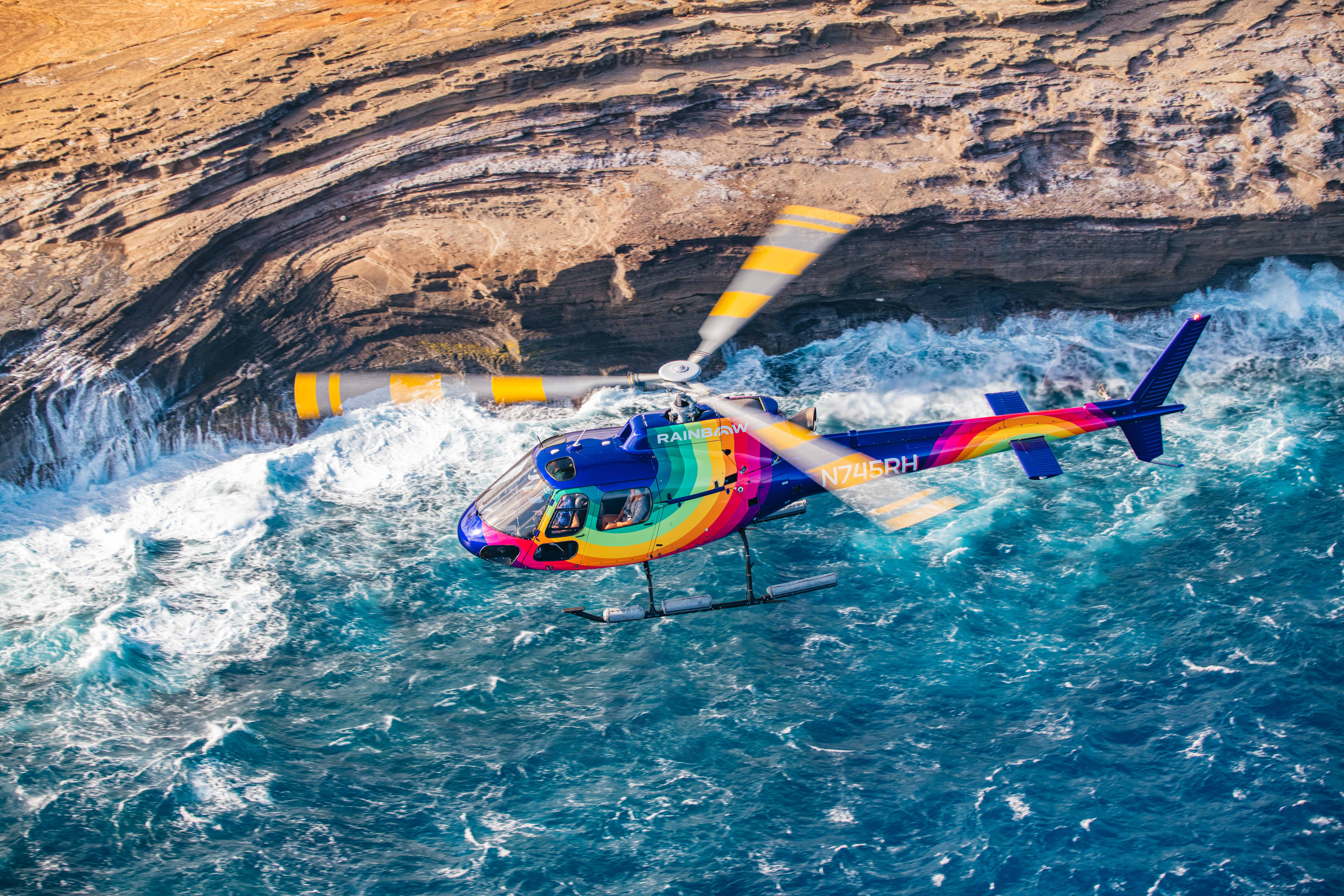
AS350 Rainbow Helicopter in Hawaii, 2021

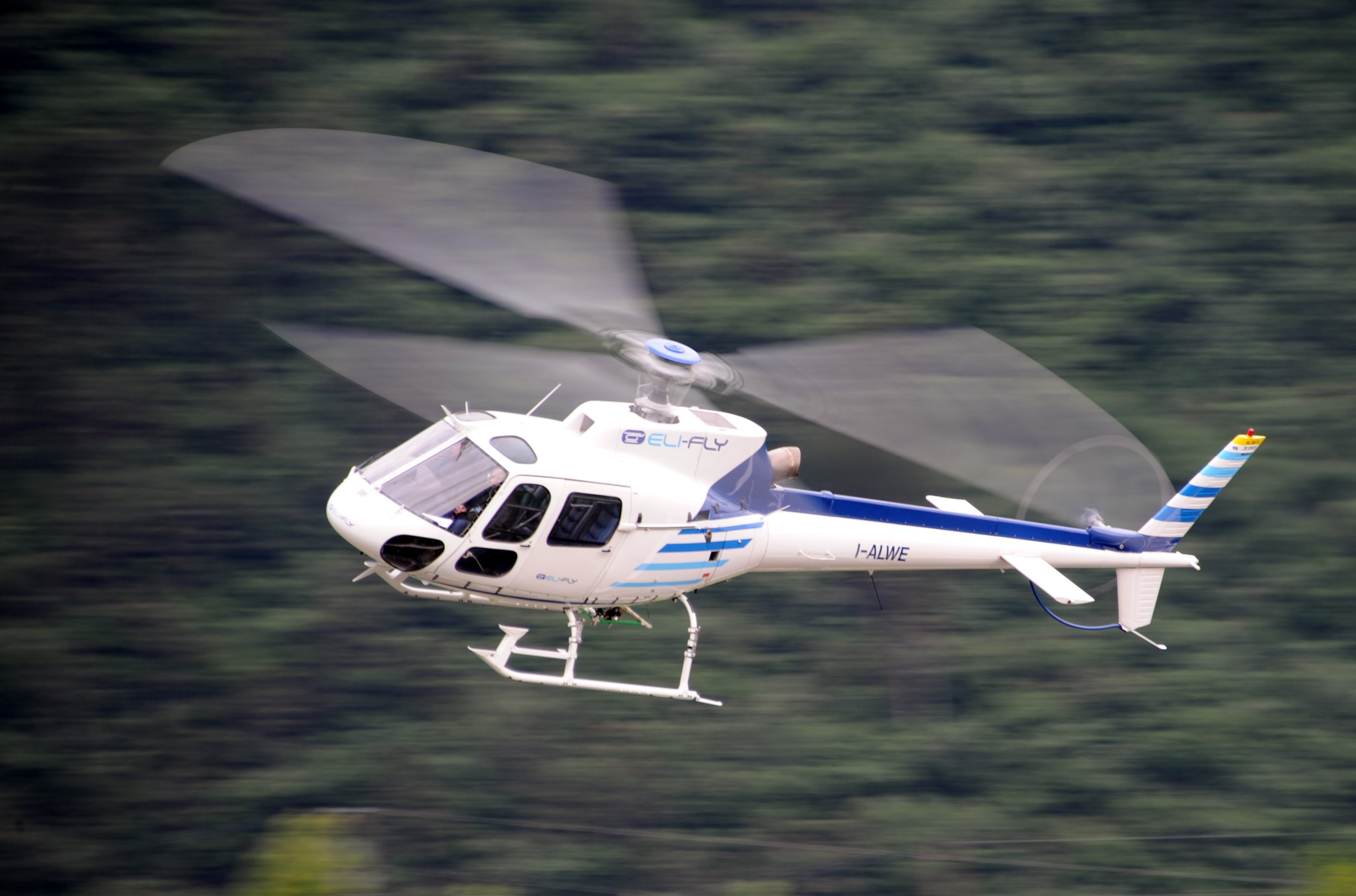
AS350 B2 Ecureuil of Elifly operator in Italy, 2018

The Airbus Helicopters H125 (previously the Eurocopter AS350) Écureuil, or Squirrel, is a single-engine light utility helicopter designed and originally manufactured by the French corporation Aérospatiale, later by Eurocopter, which became Airbus Helicopters. In North America, the H125 is marketed as the AStar. The AS355 Ecureuil 2 is a twin-engine variant, marketed in North America as the TwinStar.

The Eurocopter EC130 is a derivative of the AS350 airframe and is considered by the manufacturer to be part of the Écureuil single-engine family.

== Development ==
In the early 1970s, Aérospatiale initiated a development program to produce a replacement for the aging Aérospatiale Alouette II. While the Aérospatiale Gazelle, which had been developed in the 1960s and 1970s, had been met with numerous orders by military customers, commercial sales of the type had been less than anticipated, thus the need for a civil-oriented development was identified.

The development of the new rotorcraft, which was headed by Chief Engineer René Mouille, was focused on the production of an economic and cost-effective aerial vehicle, thus both Aérospatiale's Production and Procurement departments were heavily involved in the design process. One such measure was the use of a rolled sheet structure, a manufacturing technique adapted from the automotive industry; another innovation was the newly developed Starflex main rotor. It was also decided that both civil and military variants of the emergent helicopter would be developed to conform with established military requirements.

On 27 June 1974, the first prototype, an AS350C powered by a Lycoming LTS101 turboshaft engine, conducted its maiden flight at Marignane, France; the second prototype, powered by a Turbomeca Arriel 1A, following on 14 February 1975. The Arriel-powered version, the AS350B, intended for sale throughout the world except for North America, was certified in France on 27 October 1977, while the Lycoming powered AS350C (or AStar) was certified by the US Federal Aviation Administration on 21 December 1977. In March 1978, deliveries to customers began for the AS350B, deliveries of the AS350C began in April 1978.

Over time, the AS350 Écureuil/AStar has received further development; while the aircraft's design remains broadly similar, aspects such as the rotor system, powerplants, and avionics have been progressively improved. On 6 February 1987, a prototype AS350 flew with a fenestron tail-rotor in the place of its conventional counterpart. On 1 March 1997, the first AS350 B3, equipped with an Arriel 2B engine, performed its first flight.

Conversion programs and addons for AS350s have been produced and are offered by third-party 'aftermarket' aerospace firms in addition to those available directly from the type's prime manufacturer. Variants of the Arriel-powered AS350B, AS350 BA, AS350 B1, AS350 B2, and AS350 B3, were progressively introduced; the later B3 differing from preceding models by the increasing use of digital systems, such as the Garmin-built G500H avionics suite and full authority digital engine control (FADEC) system.

Prior to 2013, the type had been manufactured principally at Eurocopter's Marignane facility, near Marseille, France; Eurocopter opted to, as part of a move to disperse its helicopter production activities, begin AS350 production and final assembly activities at its factory in Columbus, Mississippi, for deliveries to U.S. commercial helicopter market. The Astar has been Eurocopter's biggest-selling product in the US commercial market, at one point selling roughly one AS350 every business day. In March 2015, the first Columbus-assembled AS350 B3e received its FAA certification. In December 2015, Airbus Helicopters reported their intention to double the rate of AS350 production at Columbus in 2016 over the previous year, and that the facility is capable of producing up to 65 AS350s per year.

=== Indian assembly line ===
On 26 January 2024, while the French president, Emmanuel Macron, was in India as the chief guest of the Republic Day parade, Airbus Helicopters announced its partnership with the Tata Group to establish a Final Assembly Line (FAL) in India for helicopter production. The FAL would deliver the H125 for civilian markets in India and South Asia. The facility would be set up by the Tata Advanced Systems along with Airbus within 24 months with the first Made in India helicopter, with EASA-certified quality assurance, expected to be produced in 2026. The facility's location was yet to be decided by the companies. Ten helicopters will be assembled each year, potentially increasing to 20, 30, or 50 in the future. As of July 2024, 500 units are expected to be produced in 20 years. The H125 base variant produced in India, will cost above Euro 3.2 million.

On 23 July 2024, TASL and Airbus signed the deal for production. The H125's engine and gearbox will come from France, the main airframe from Germany, and the tail boom from Spain. The component assemblies to be done in India include avionics and mission systems, flight controls, hydraulic circuits, fuel system and the engine.

As of July 2024, Airbus identified 8 locations to become potential sites for the FAL, which was shortlisted to four by January 2025. The sites were located in Uttar Pradesh, Gujarat, Andhra Pradesh and Karnataka. In May, it was decided the new site will be erected in the Vemagal Industrial Area of Kolar, Karnataka. This would be the fourth such assembly line for the helicopter in the world. The first helicopter is expected to be delivered in early 2027.

On 26 February 2025, the Indian Army chief, General Upendra Dwivedi, visited the Airbus facility in France where he was demonstrated the military capabilities of the helicopter. On 28 August, Airbus Helicopters signed a contract with Mahindra Aerostructures Pvt. Ltd. (MAPL) as part of which MAPL will supply the main fuselage of the H125 helicopter. The manufacturing is expected to begin immediately at MAPL's existing plant in Bengaluru with the first unit scheduled to be delivered in 2027.

The H125 is reportedly one of the frontrunner in the Reconnaissance and Surveillance Helicopters (RSH) tender launched in August 2026.

On 17 February 2026, the Prime Minister of India, Narendra Modi, and the President of France, Emmanuel Macron, virtually inaugurated the Final Assembly Line at Vemegal from Mumbai. The investment in the programme will likely exceed ₹1,000 billion (US$11 billion).

== Design ==
The AS350 is a single engine helicopter, powered either by a Lycoming LTS101 or Turbomeca Arriel powerplant that drives a three-blade main rotor, which is furnished with a Starflex rotor head. The type is known for its high-altitude performance and has seen use by operators in such environments. Both the main and tail rotors make use of composite material and are designed to minimize corrosion and maintenance requirements.

The AS350 was also developed to comply with the noise requirements in place in locations such as national parks; the in-cabin noise levels are such that passengers may also readily converse during flight. The aircraft can also be quickly started up and shut down, which is often useful during emergency medical services roles. It is equipped with hydraulically-assisted flight controls; these controls remain operational, albeit operated with greater physical effort, in the event of a hydraulic failure.

Much of the AS350's avionics are provided by Garmin, such as the GI 106A course-deviation indicator, GNS 430 VHF/VOR/localizer/glideslope indicator/Global Positioning System receiver, GTX 327 Mode A and C transponder, and GMA 340H intercom. The Vehicle and Engine Multifunction Display (VEMD) and the First Limit Indicator (FLI) both serve to increase the aircraft's safety during flight, reducing the number of gauges that need to be monitored by the pilot and thereby reducing their workload. For increased smoothness in flight, which positively affects passenger comfort as well as safety, stability augmentation systems can be installed. Later-production aircraft feature new avionics and systems such as the integration of an Automatic Flight Control System (AFCS) and autopilot, a glass cockpit featuring three liquid-crystal displays (LCDs) and digital avionics, such as the synthetic-vision terrain mapping system and Airbus's Multibloc center console upon which radios may be mounted.

The AS350 has proven popular in a range of roles; multiple cabin configurations can be used, between four and six passengers in a typical seating configuration, and large sliding doors can be fitted to either side of the cabin. In some operators' fleets, the furnishings of the cabin has been designed to enable the internal space and/or equipment fit-out to be rapidly reconfigured to enable aircraft to be switched between roles.

Public service operators, such as those in law enforcement, often have forward looking infrared (FLIR) cameras and other mission systems installed on their aircraft. Other optional equipment on offer to operates had included real-time data links, rescue hoists, underslung cargo hooks, electrical external mirrors, search lights, tactical consoles, night vision goggle-compatibility, moving-map system, internal cabin tie-downs, second battery kit, sand filters, wire strike protection system, 4-channel radio, tail rotor arch, cabin floor windows, and removable seats.

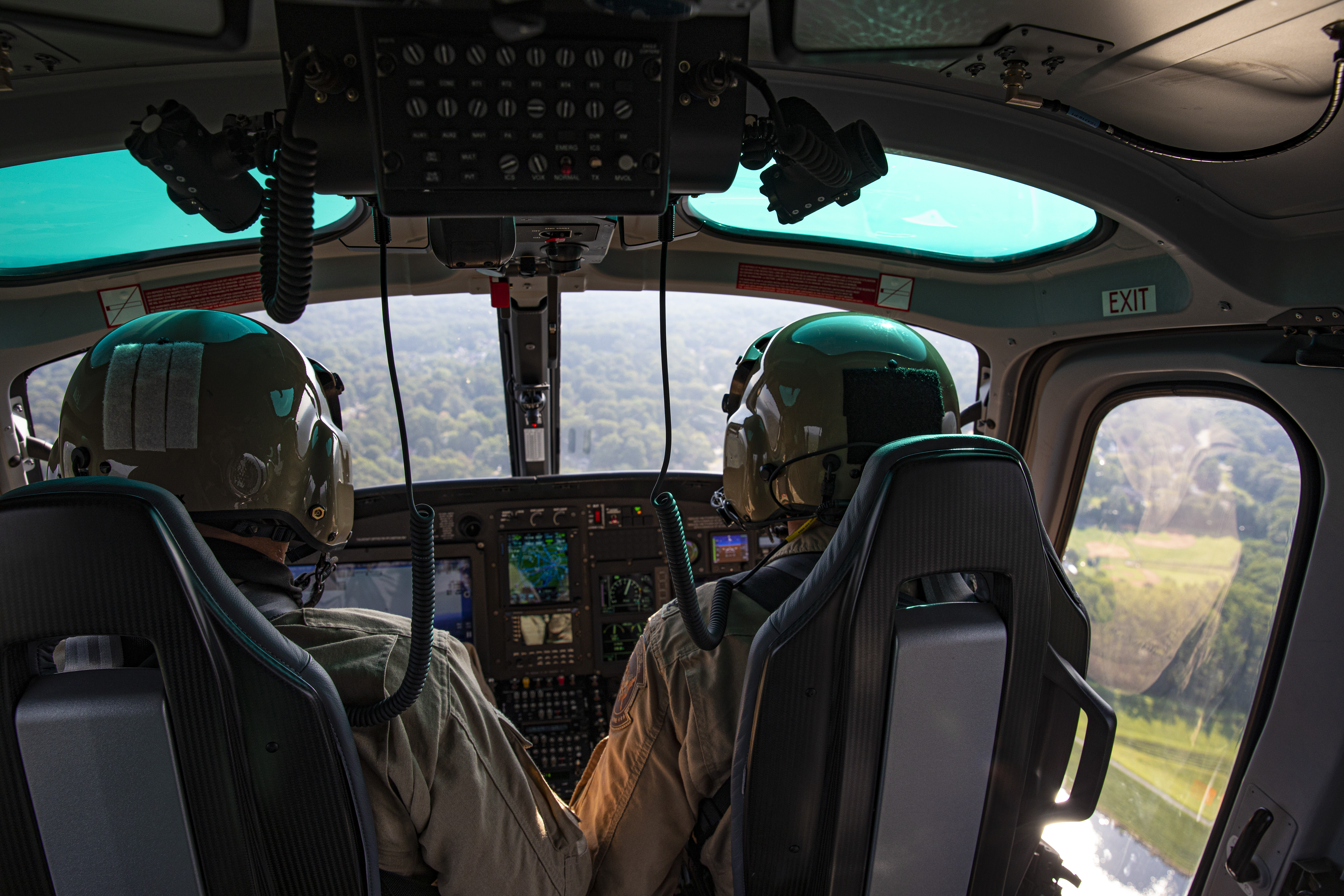
H125 cockpit

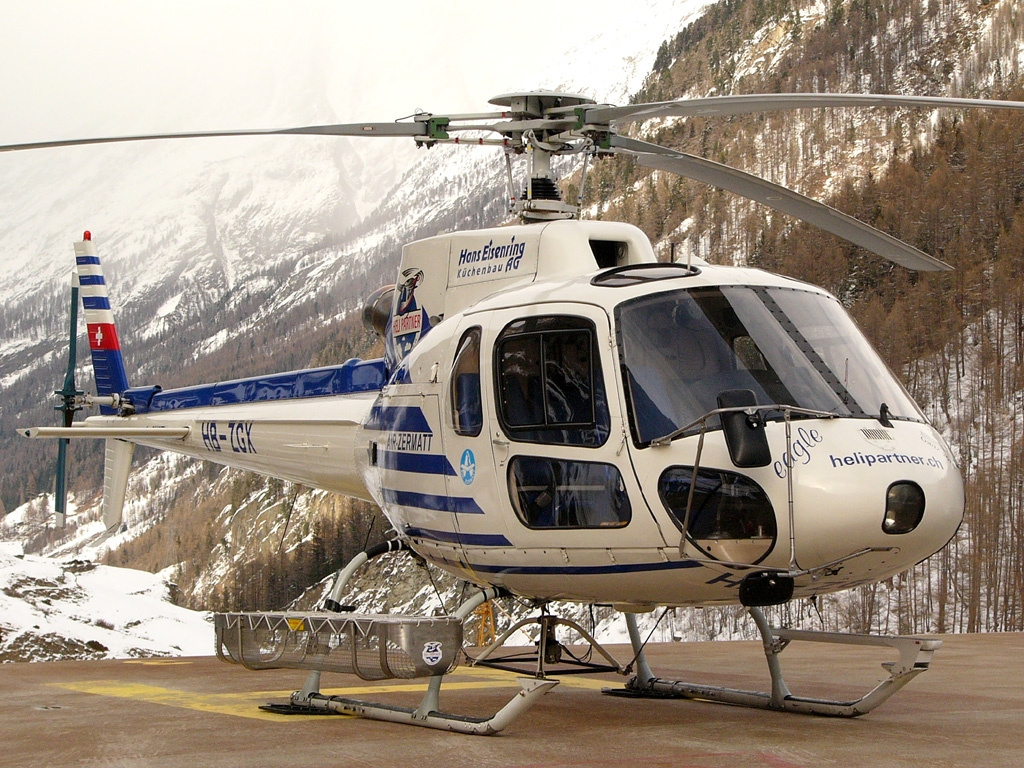
AS350B2, Switzerland, 2006

Modern aircraft have refinements beyond those featuring on older models; these changes include dual-channel FADEC-equipped engines, increasing use of digital avionics in the cockpit, decreased maintenance costs, a re-designed cabin, and a comfortable Stylence interior (optional). Older aircraft often undergo refurbishment programs to install aftermarket features, or for the addition of functionality common to newer production aircraft, such as retrofitting of the glass cockpit.

== Operational history ==
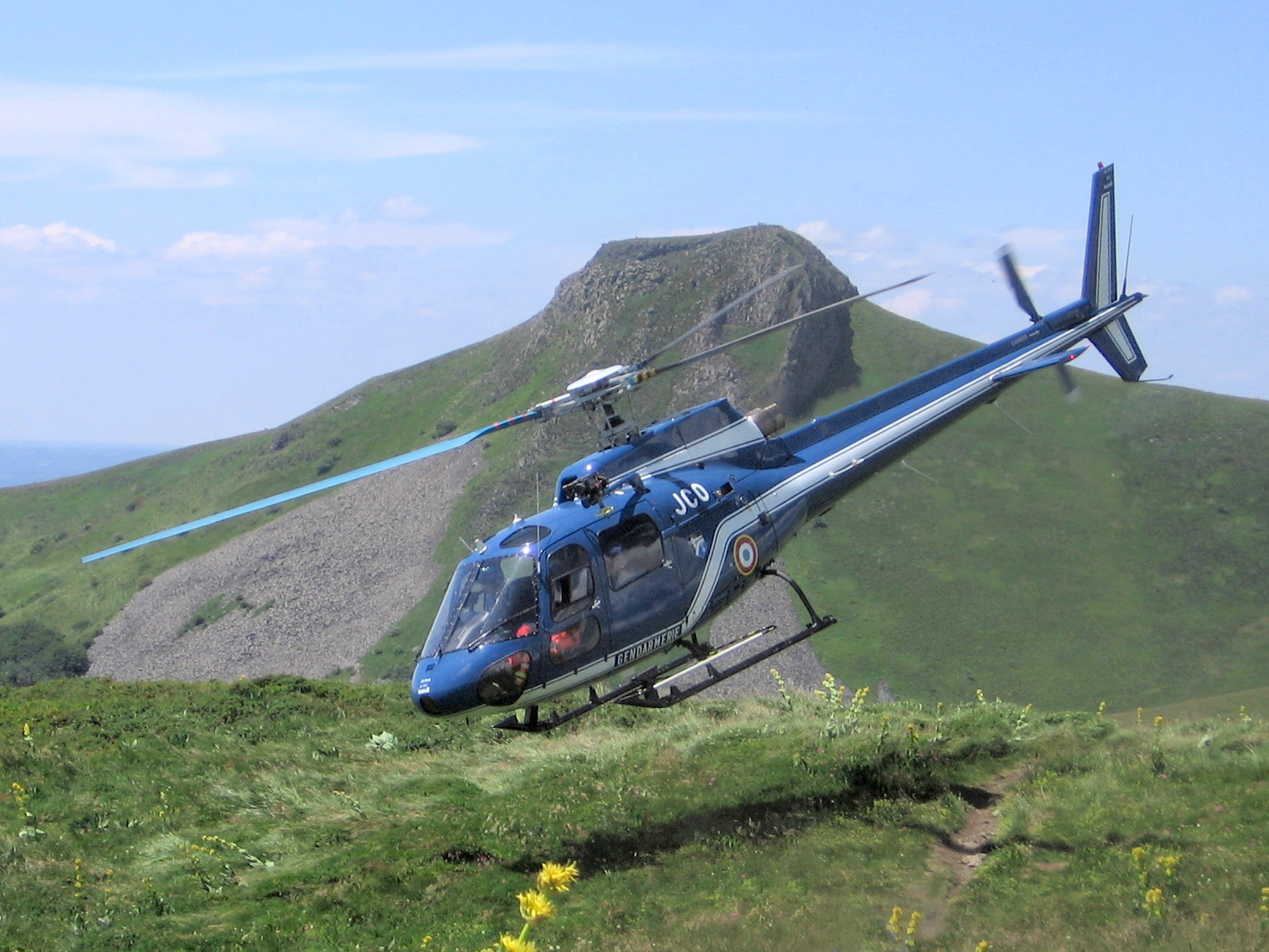
A French Gendarmerie AS350, 2005

On 14 May 2005, an AS350 B3 piloted by Eurocopter test pilot Didier Delsalle touched down on the top of Mount Everest, at 8,848 m (29,030 ft), a record that has been confirmed by the Fédération Aéronautique Internationale. Although Delsalle used a standard version of the Eurocopter, he removed unnecessary elements, such as passenger seats, to reduce the standard weight by 120 kg and increase the fuel range by an additional hour. On 29 April 2010, a stripped-down AS350 B3 rescued three Spanish alpinists, one at a time, from the slopes of Annapurna I, Nepal at an altitude of 6,900 m (22,640 ft); this set a new record for the highest such rescue. The record was increased to 7,800 m (25,590 ft), during the rescue of Sudarshan Gautam between Camps III & IV in Everest's Yellow Band on the morning of 20 May 2013. On 2 June 2014, an AS350 B3e broke a national record in Mexico by successfully landing on the peak of Pico de Orizaba, at 5,636 m (18,490 ft), the nation's tallest mountain.

The AS350 AStar has been successful in the US market, having become the most popular helicopter platform in use with American governmental agencies, law enforcement being a typical use of the type, by 2015. By 1999, the AS350 had become the prime helicopter being used by the United States Customs Service for light enforcement operations; by 2007, the agency had become the single largest operator of the type in the world. By 2012, out of the 3,300 AS350s in operation across the world, 783 of them were in service with American-based operators.

In the Russian market since 2006, the AS350 and other helicopters built by the manufacturer have been sold and supported by wholly owned subsidiary Eurocopter Vostok; UTair Aviation soon emerged as the largest Russian operator of the AS350 B3e with a fleet of at least 20 of the type.

In December 2014, EASA validation was issued for Airbus Helicopters China to conduct training and support activity at their facility in Shenzhen, China; various components of the AS350 (such as the main and tail gearboxes) are now maintained locally. On 9 September 2015, China's first helicopter leasing company, CM International Financial Leasing Corp Ltd (CMIFL), placed an order for 100 Ecureuil-series helicopters, these are to be a mix of H125 and H130 helicopters.

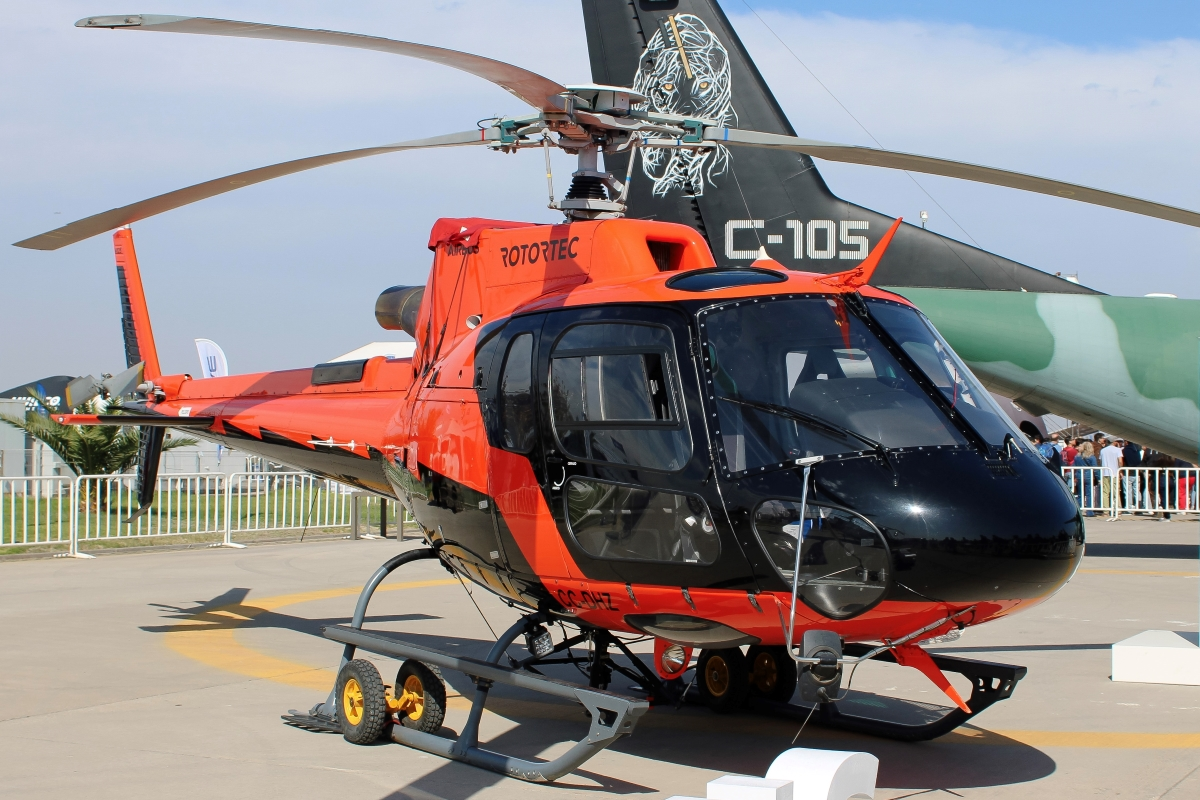
An airbus H125 (Eurocoptes As350) operated by Rotortec

Brazil has been an extensive operator of the AS350; by 2011 more than 300 helicopters were operating in the country, including from the flight deck of the Brazilian aircraft carrier São Paulo. Since 1984, the Brazilian Navy has used AS350s to support the Brazilian Antarctic Program. Helibras, a wholly owned subsidiary of Eurocopter, operates in the country; of the 600 helicopters it had domestically manufactured for the Brazilian market by 2012, 70% were AS350s. In January 2011, Helibras signed a contract with the Brazilian Army to substantially upgrade and refurbish their existing fleet of 36 AS350 Ecureuils.

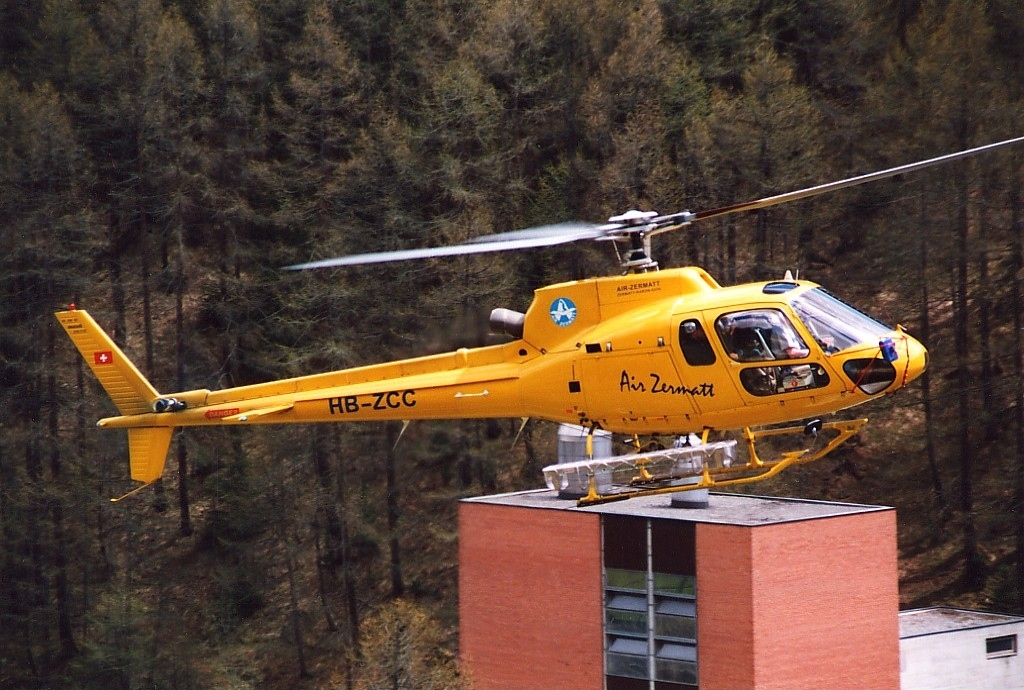
AS350 B2, 2001

In the United Kingdom, the Defence Helicopter Flying School operated 26 AS350, designated Squirrel HT1, for the training of pilots of Britain's armed forces; the type was introduced from 1997 onwards as a replacement for the Aérospatiale Gazelle. In September 2014, the UK's Ministry of Defence issued a request for proposals to replace the Squirrel HT1; Airbus Helicopters has already announced its intention to offer a mixed fleet of Eurocopter EC130s and Eurocopter EC135s in response. Since May 1984, the Royal Australian Navy's Fleet Air Arm has operated a fleet of AS350s, these were upgraded to the AS350 BA standard in 1995; the Royal Australian Air Force had previously operated the AS350 for training purposes, and briefly for search and rescue missions, but these were later transferred to the Australian Army. In 2017, the AS350 was retired from Australian Navy service.

Between June 2007 and December 2007, the Danish Air Force operated a deployment of four AS350 helicopters at Basra International Airport, Iraq, to perform liaison and reconnaissance missions in support of coalition forces during the Iraq War. In June 2015, the Argentine Defense Ministry ordered 12 H125s to replace their 1970s era Aérospatiale SA 315B Lamas for para-public support missions, such as search and rescue operations, inside Argentina. By June 2020, 3,663 H125 were operational, the largest number of any type.

In June 1978, Transport Canada (TC) issued the Canadian type certificate for the AS 350 C model, marking it as the first of the AS 350 series certified in Canada. The AS 350 B was added to the type certificate's data sheet in February 1980, and the AS 350 B1 received certification from TC in July 1988. AS350s are widely utilized in Canada for fire suppression and mountain operations. This versatile helicopter is frequently equipped with a Bambi Bucket, capable of carrying up to 1,500 liters of water, making it an effective tool for aerial firefighting. The AS350's agility, power, and ability to operate in challenging terrains, such as dense forests and mountainous regions, make it invaluable for combating wildfires.

== Variants ==
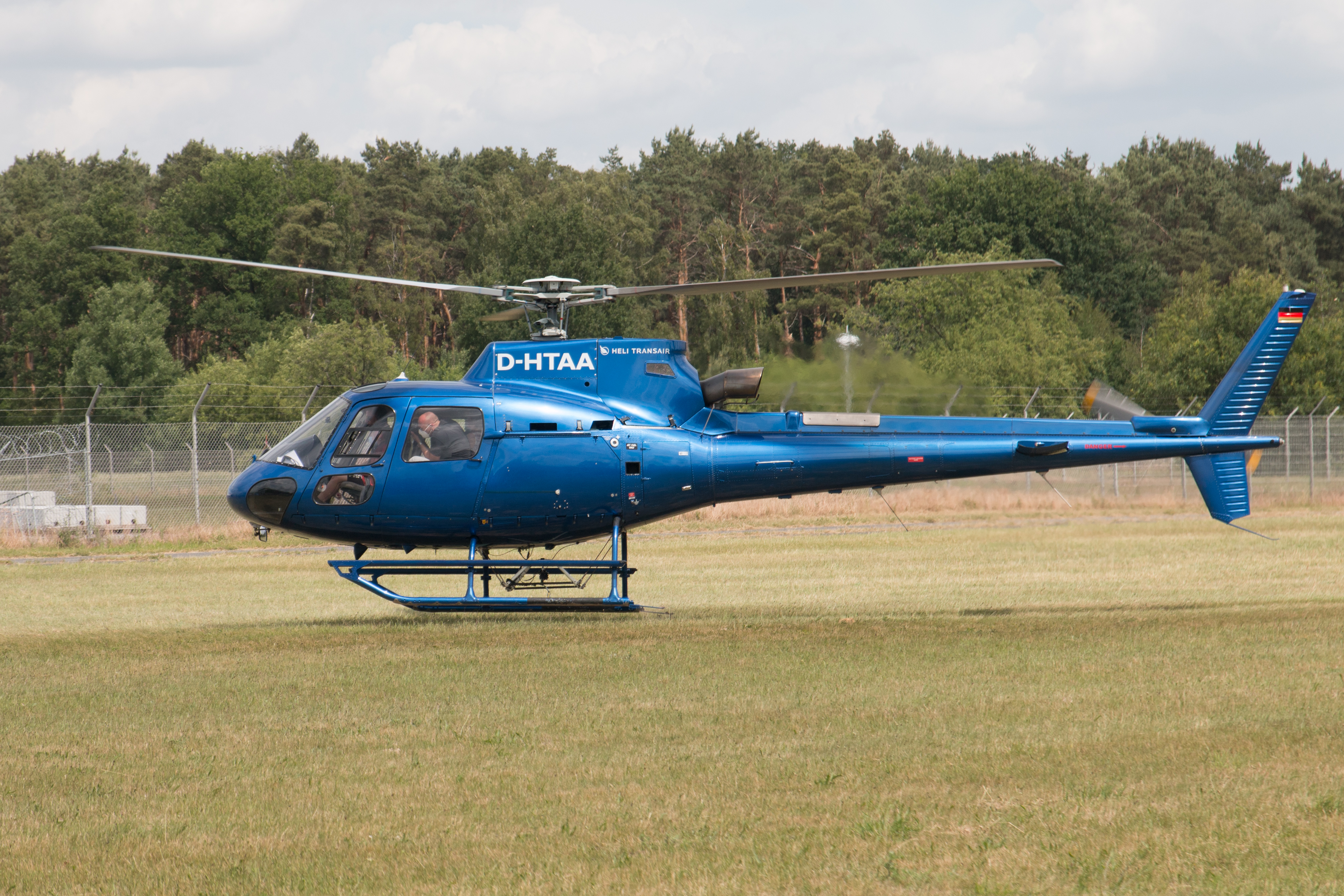
AS 350 B3

AS350
Prototype.
AS350 Firefighter
Fire fighting version.
AS350B
Powered by one Turbomeca Arriel 1B engine.
AS350 B1
Improved version of the original AS350B, which is powered by one Arriel 1D engine, type also fitted with AS355 main rotor blades, AS355 tail rotor with tabs and a tail rotor servo.
AS350 B2
Higher gross weight version powered by one Arriel 1D1 engine over the B1 version with aerodynamic strake fitted to tail boom along the starboard side and angled engine exhaust duct for better yaw control.
AS350 B3
High-performance version, is powered by an Arriel 2B engine equipped with a single channel Digital Engine Control Unit (DECU) with a mechanical backup system. This helicopter is the first ever to land on the summit of Mount Everest. AS350 B3/2B1 variant introduces enhanced engine with dual channel Full Authority Digital Engine Control (FADEC), dual hydraulics and a 2,370 kg (5,225 lb) Maximum Take Off Weight.
AS350 B3e/H125
AS350 B3e (introduced late 2011) equipped with the Arriel 2D engine producing 952 horsepower; AS350 B3e renamed H125.
AS350 BA
Powered by an Arriel 1B engine and fitted with wider chord AS355 main rotor blades and tail rotor servo.
AS350 BB
AS350 B2 variant selected to meet rotary-wing training needs of UK MoD, through its Defence Helicopter Flying School in 1996. Powered by a derated Arriel 1D1 engine to improve the helicopters' life cycle.
Eurocopter Squirrel HT.1
Designation of AS350BB formally operated by the British Military, through the Defence Helicopter Flying School as a training helicopter.
Eurocopter Squirrel HT.2
Designation of AS350BB formally operated by the British Army Air Corps as a training helicopter, based at Middle Wallop. Now retired.
AS350 C
Initial variant of Lycoming LTS-101-600A2 powered version developed for the North American market as the AStar. Quickly superseded by AS350D.
AS350 D
Powered by one Lycoming LTS-101 engine for the North American market as the AStar. At one stage marketed as AStar 'Mark III.'
AS350 L1
Military derivative of AS350 B1, powered by a 510kW (684shp) Turbomeca Arriel 1D turboshaft engine. Superseded by AS350 L2.
AS350 L2
Military derivative of AS350 B2, powered by a 546 kW (732shp) Turbomeca Arriel 1D1 turboshaft engine. Designation superseded by AS550 C2.
HB350 B Esquilo
Unarmed military version for the Brazilian Air Force. Brazilian designations CH-50 and TH-50. Built under licence by Helibras in Brazil.
HB350 B1 Esquilo
Unarmed military version for the Brazilian Navy. Brazilian designation UH-12. Built under licence by Helibras in Brazil.
HB350 L1
Armed military version for the Brazilian Army. Brazilian designation HA-1. Built under licence by Helibras in Brazil.
IH-18
Brazilian Navy designation of the Airbus H125.

=== Aftermarket conversions ===
Soloy SD1, Super D
AS350 BA, D powered by an LTS101-600A-3A engine.
Soloy AllStar
AS350 BA powered by a Rolls-Royce 250-C30 engine.
Soloy SD2
AS350 B2 powered by an LTS101-700D-2 engine.

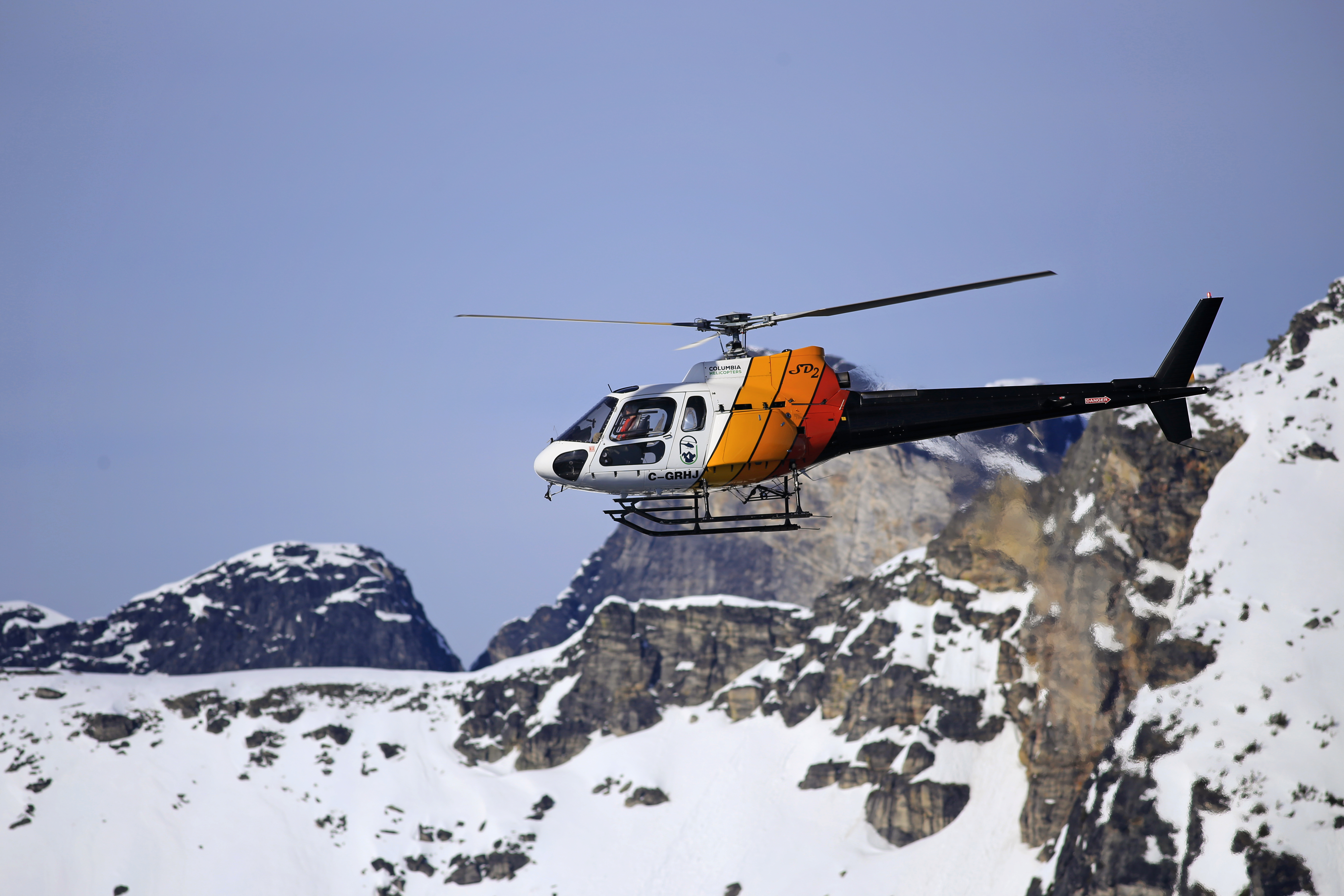
An Airbus AS350 SD2 operated by Columbia Helicopters

Heli-Lynx 350FX1
AS350 BA powered by an LTS101-600A-3A engine.
Heli-Lynx 350FX2
AS350 BA or AS350 B2 powered by an LTS101-700D-2 engine.
Otech AS350BA+
AS350 BA powered by an LTS101-600A-3A engine.

== Operators ==
The AS350 is in service around the world operated by private individuals, airline and charter operators, emergency medical teams, governments and law enforcement agencies.

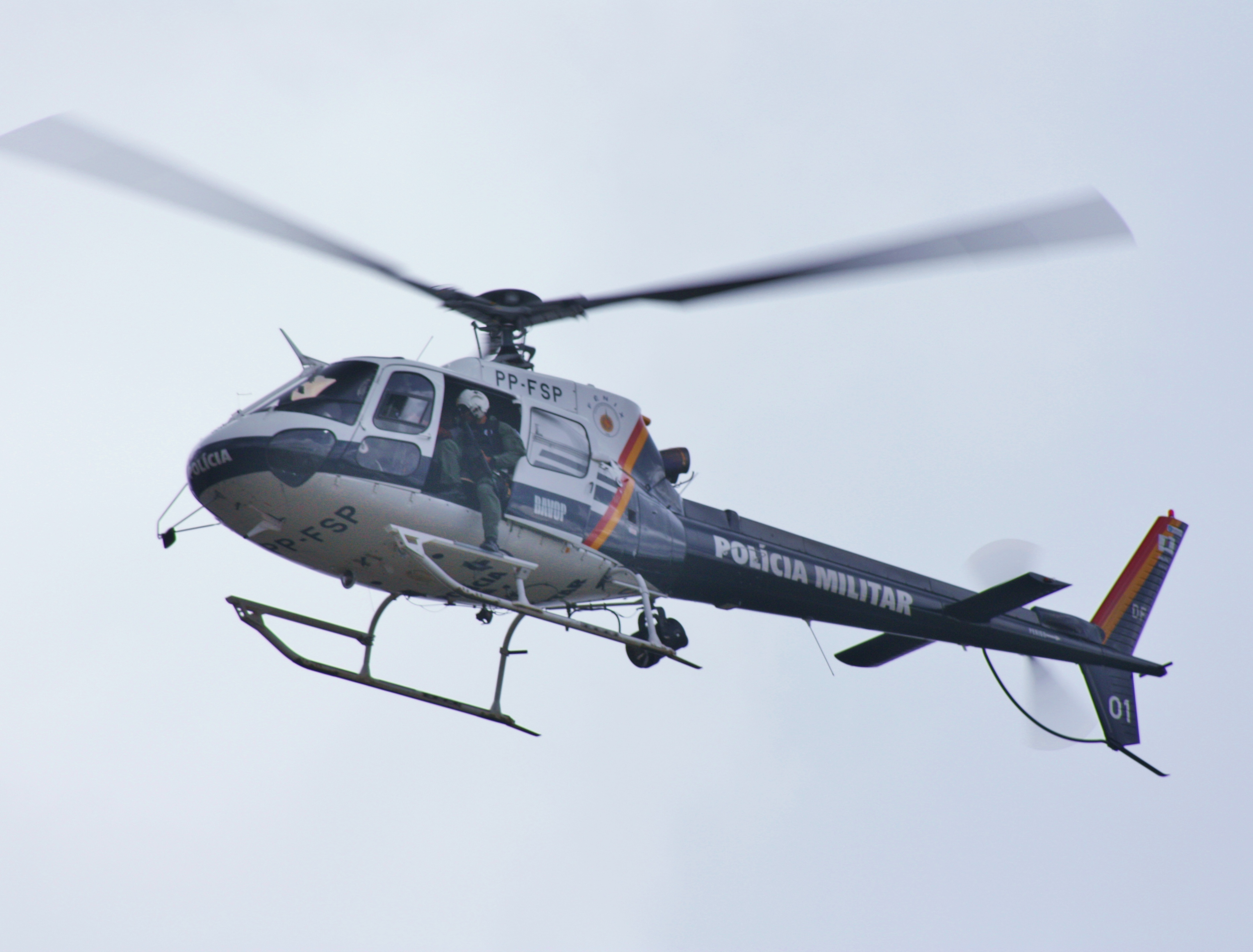
An AS350 of the PMDF in Brazil

=== Military and government operators ===
Argentina

- Argentine National Gendarmerie
- Buenos Aires Province Police

Austria

- Austrian Federal Police

Bolivia

- Bolivian Air Force

Botswana

- Botswana Defence Force Air Wing

Brazil

- Brazilian Air Force
- Brazilian Naval Aviation
- Ibama
- São Paulo State Police
- Military Brigade of Rio Grande do Sul
- Minas Gerais State Police

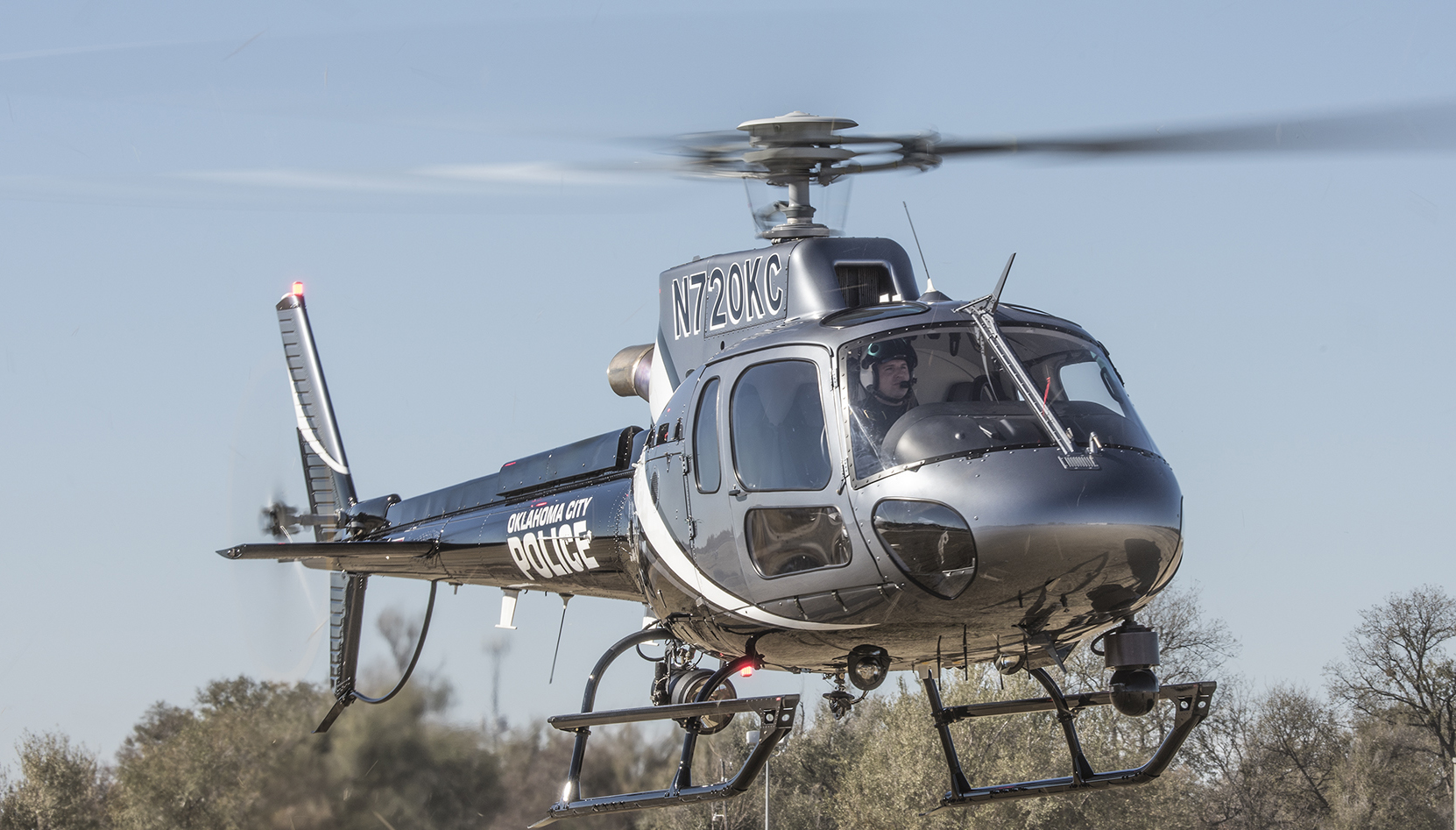
Oklahoma City Police Department's AS350 B3e

Burkina Faso

- Burkina Faso Air Force

Cambodia

- Royal Cambodian Air Force

Canada

- Calgary Police Service
- Edmonton Police Service
- Peel Regional Police
- Royal Canadian Mounted Police
- York Regional Police (delivered 2023)
- Canadian Helicopters

Central African Republic

- Central African Republic Air Force

Chad

- Chadian Air Force

Chile

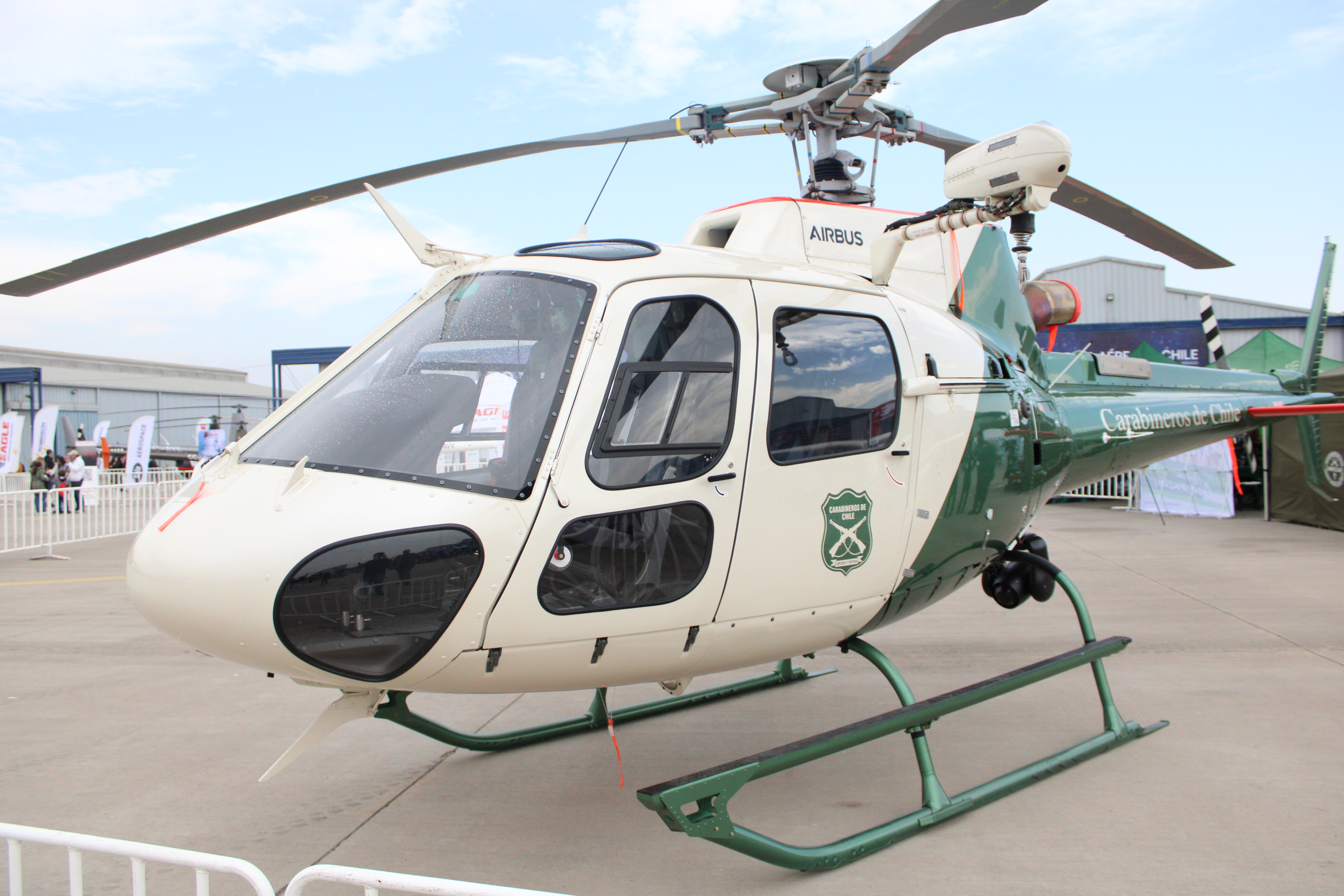
- Carabineros de Chile AS350
  Chilean Army
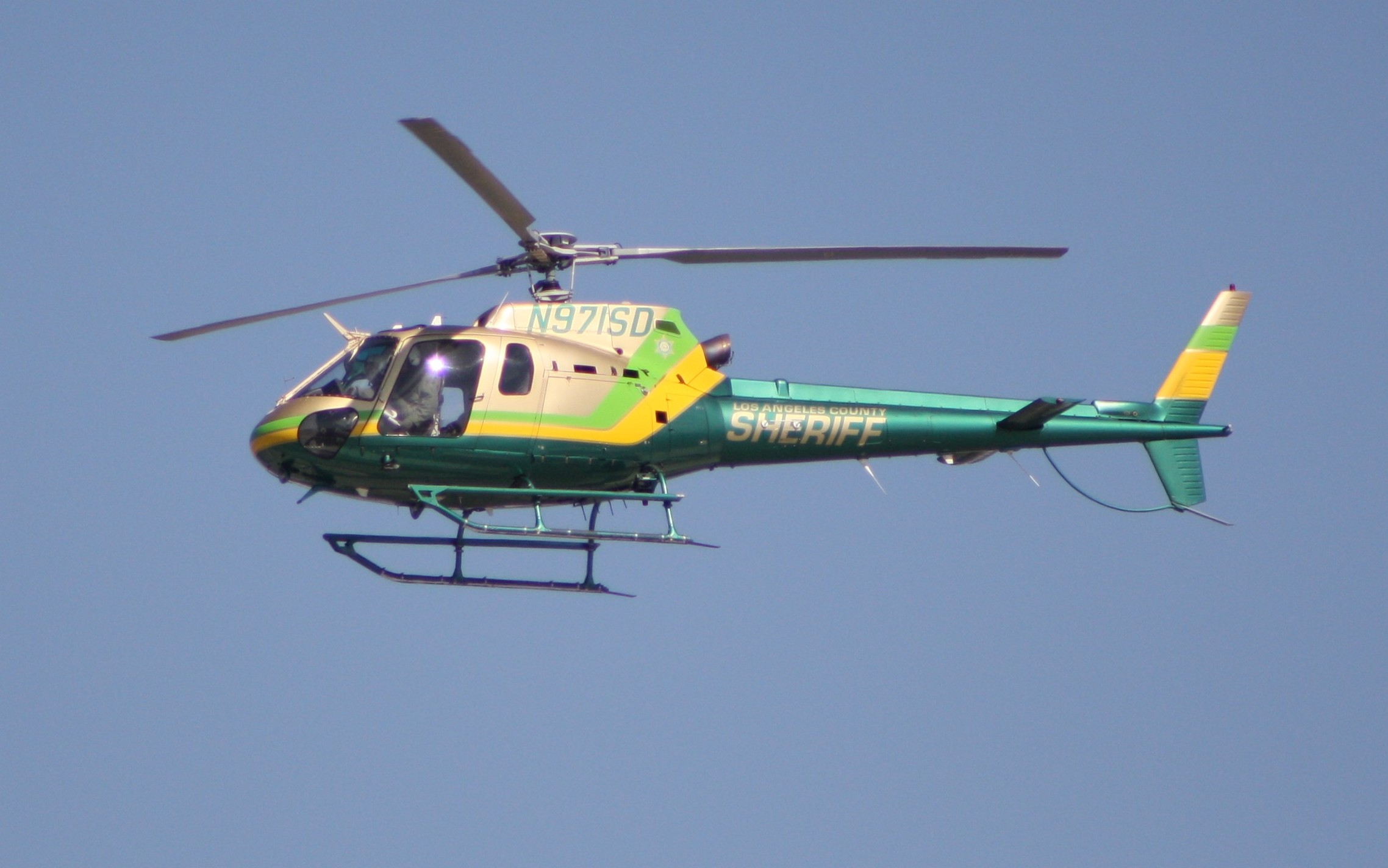
  Los Angeles County Sheriff's Department AS350 B2
- Chilean Navy

Denmark

- Royal Danish Air Force

Ecuador

- Ecuadorian Army

Egypt

- Egyptian Air Force

France

- Gendarmerie Nationale

Gabon

- Gabonese Air Force

Georgia

- Ministry of Internal Affairs

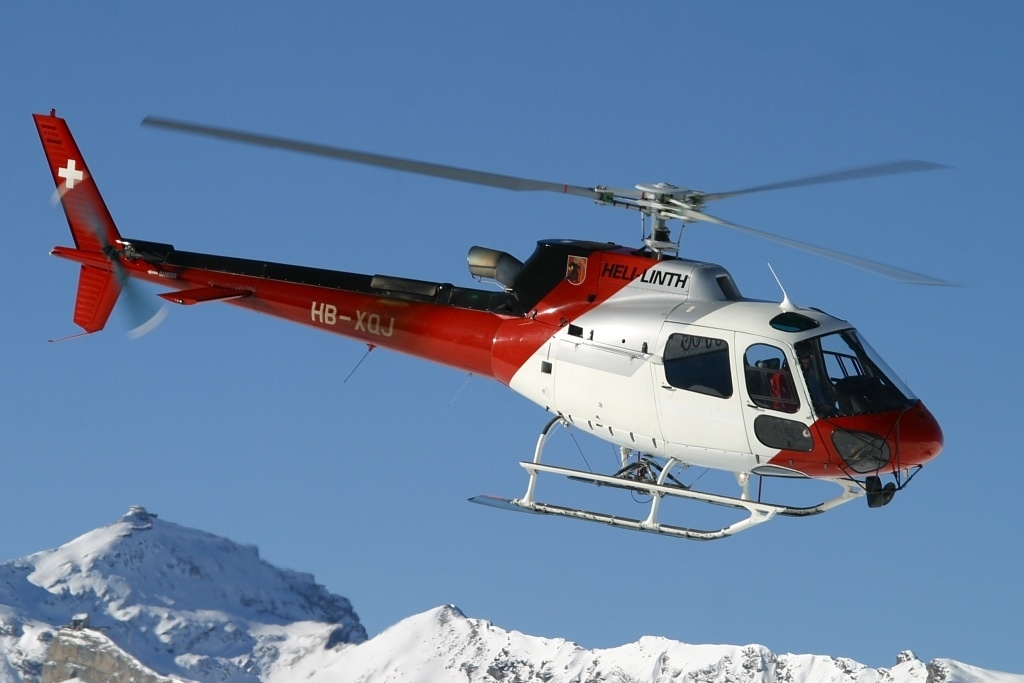
AS350B-3 Écureuil over Lauberhorn, Switzerland

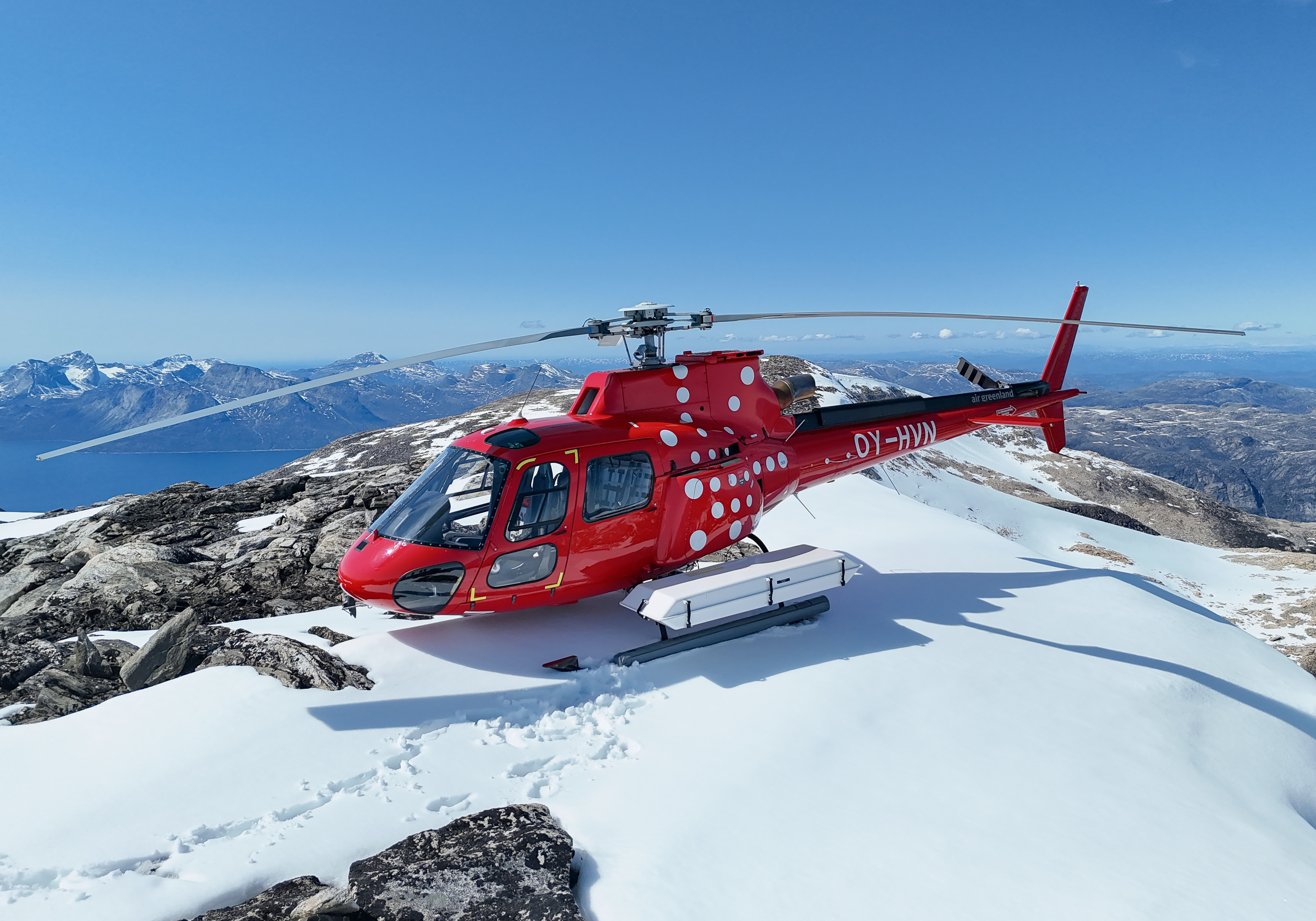
AS350-B3 Écureuil on top of Kinaussak Mountain in Greenland

Guatemala

- Guatemalan Air Force

Greenland

- Air Greenland

Iceland

- Icelandic Coast Guard

Indonesia

- Municipal Government of Mimika Regency

Israel

- Israel Police

Jordan

- Royal Jordanian Air Force

Kenya

- Kenya Air Force

Kurdistan Region

- CTG Kurdistan

Lesotho

- Lesotho Defence Force

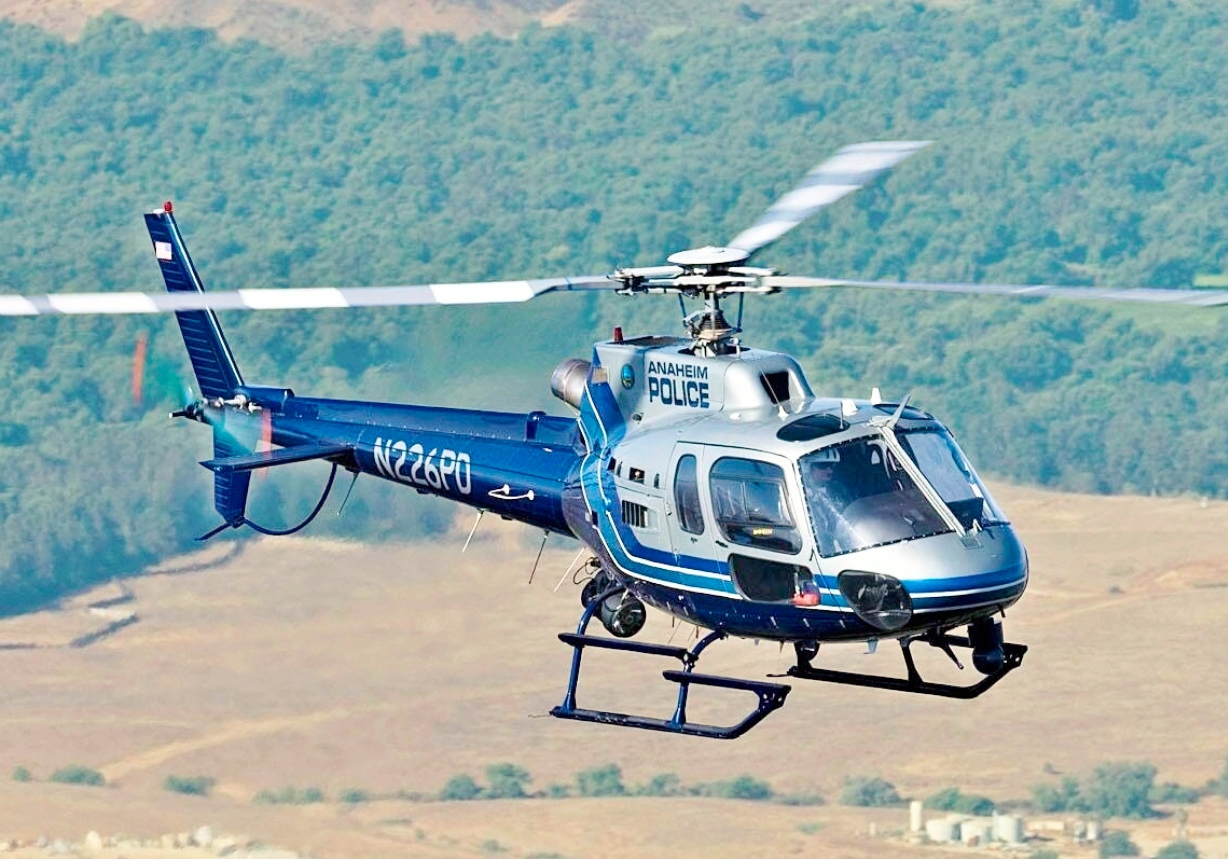
Anaheim Police Department's AS350 B2, known Angel

Madagascar

- Malagasy Air Force

Malawi

- Malawi Army Air Wing

Namibia

- Namibian Police Force

Nepal

- Nepalese Army Air Service

Pakistan

- Pakistan Army Aviation
- Pakistan Air Force
- Government of Khyber Pakhtunkhwa

Paraguay

- Paraguayan Air Force
- Paraguayan Naval Aviation

Philippines

- Philippine Coast Guard

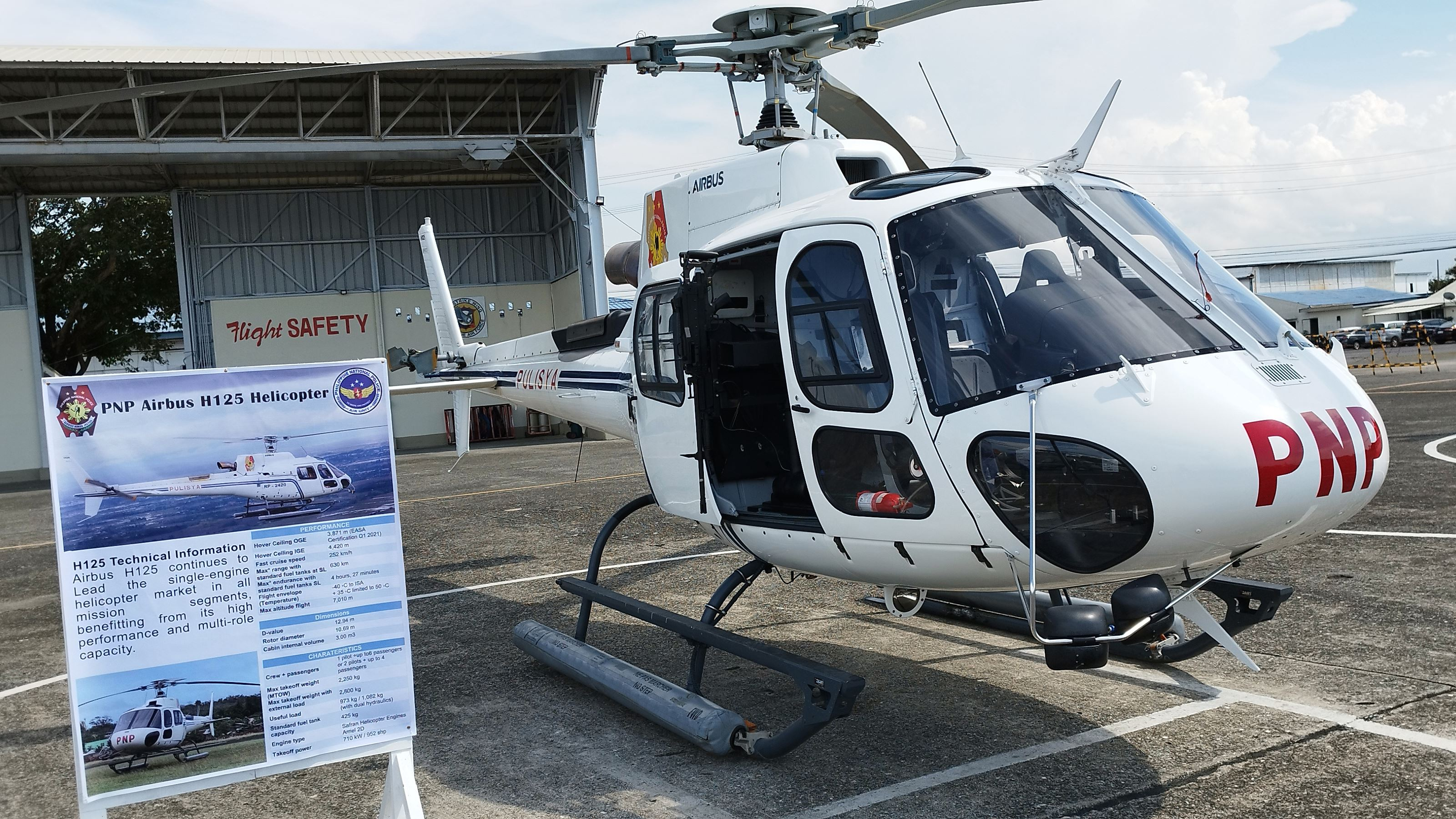
An armed H125 of the PNP at PFDX 2023

- Philippine National Police- AS350BA 3 units delivered 1995 retired in 2018 .H125B3E 7 units delivered 2019 to 2021.

Portugal

- Ministry of Internal Administration

Qatar

- Qatar Ministry of Defence

Russia

- Russian Aerospace Forces

South Africa

- South African Police Service
- South African National Parks Air Wing

United Kingdom

- Empire Test Pilots School

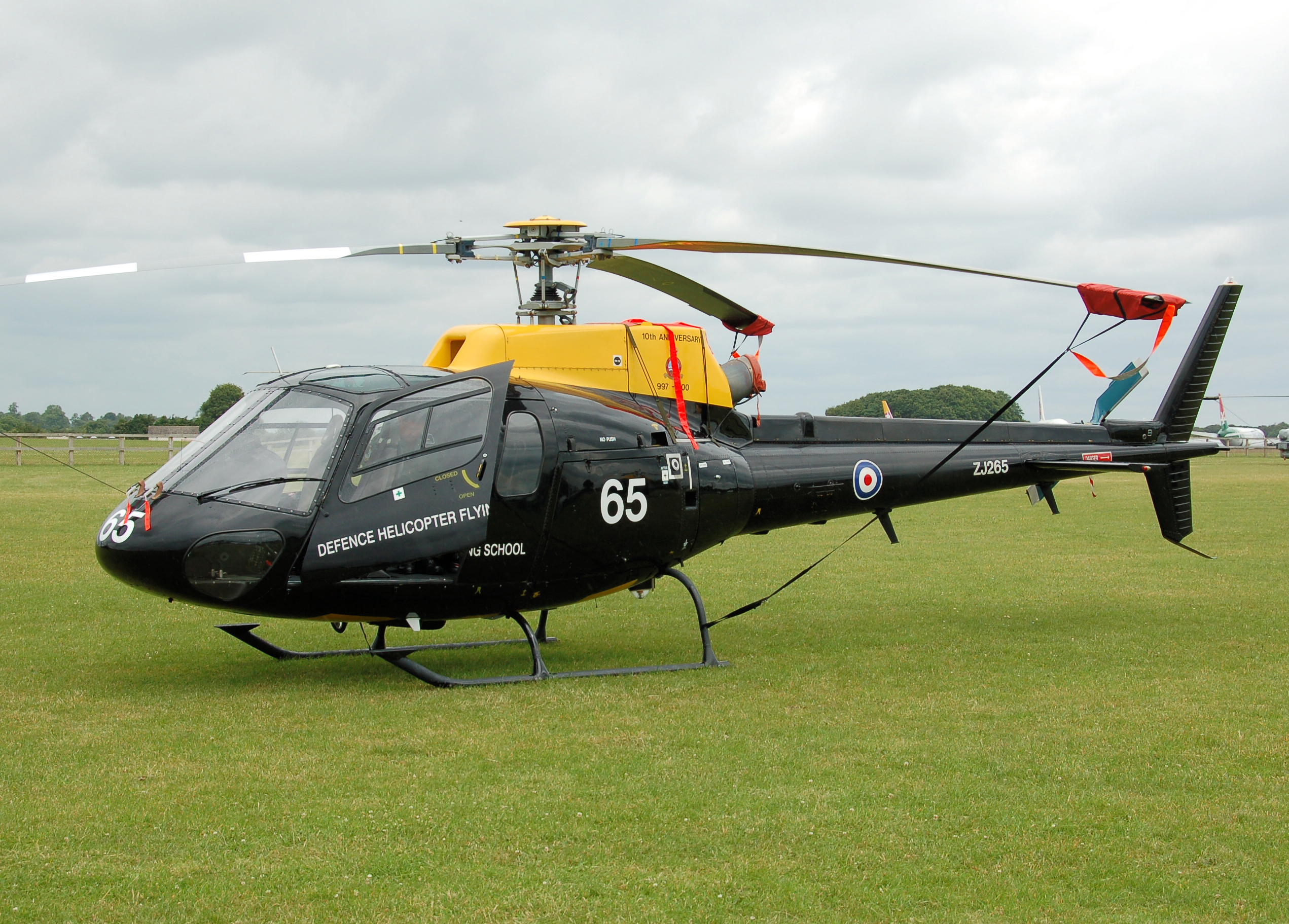
AS.350BB Squirrel HT1 of the (UK) Defence Helicopter Flying School

United States

- Texas DPS
- Alaska State Troopers
- Anaheim Police Department
- Baltimore County Police Department
- California Highway Patrol
- East Flagler Mosquito Control District
- Kansas State Highway Patrol
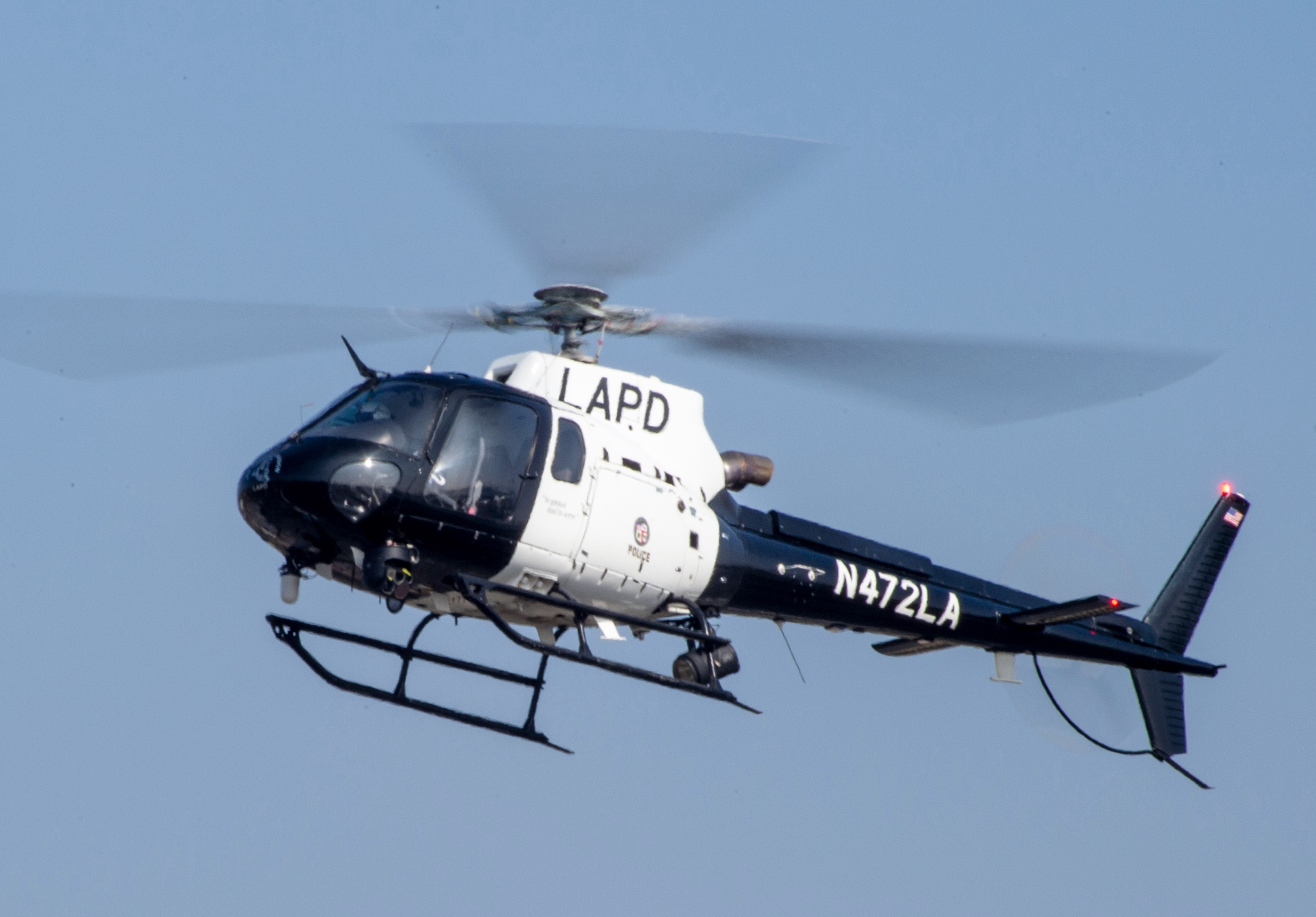
  An AS350 of the LAPD
- Los Angeles County Sheriff's Department
- Los Angeles Police Department
- Long Beach Police Department (California)
- Memphis Police Department
- D.C. Metropolitan Police Department, both AS350B3 and H125 variants in use.
- New Mexico State Police
- Miami Police Department
- Oakland County Sheriff's Office
- Ohio State Highway Patrol
- Oklahoma City Police Department
- Orange County Sheriff's Department
- Philadelphia Police Department

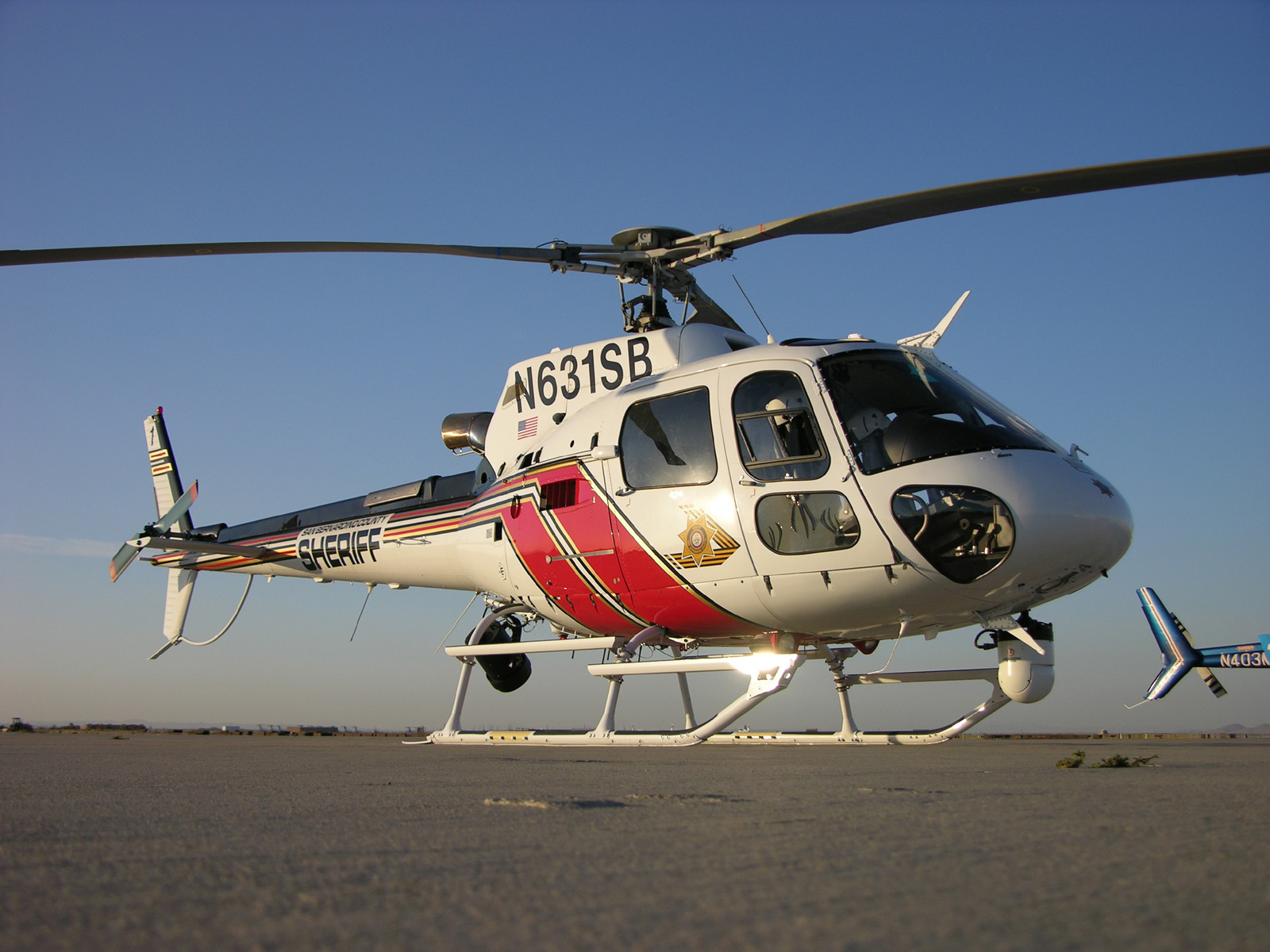
San Bernardino County Sheriff's Department AS350 B3

- San Diego Police Department
- San Jose Police Department
- U.S. Customs and Border Protection

Ukraine

- Ministry of Internal Affairs
  - State Border Guard Service

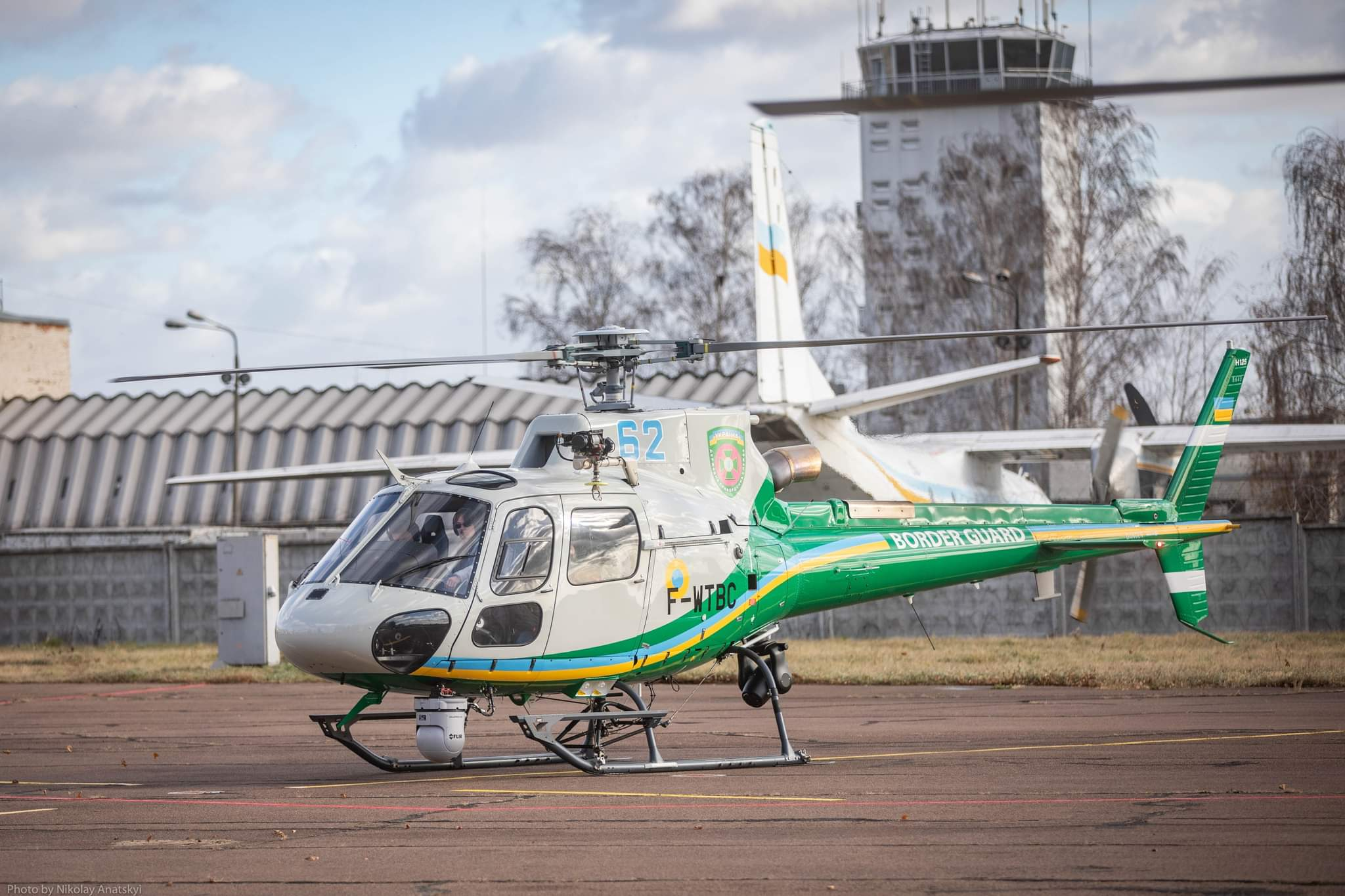
H125 State Border Guard Service of Ukraine

=== Retired ===
Albania

- Albanian Air Force

Australia

- Royal Australian Navy

United Kingdom

- Defence Helicopter Flying School

== Aircraft on display ==
=== Australia ===
- N22-001 – RAAF Museum, Point Cook.
- N22-015 – The Fleet Air Arm Museum, Nowra.
- N22-017 – The Australian War Memorial.
- N22-018 – To serve as “Gate Guard”, HMAS Albatross.
- N22-019 – Army Aviation Museum, Oakey.

=== Philippines ===
- A Philippine National Police AS350BA with tail numbers RP-2041 on outdoor static Display at Fort Sto Domingo Sta Rosa, Laguna, Luzon, Philippines.

=== Singapore ===
- Eurocopter AS350 at the Singapore Air Force Museum.

== Notable accidents and incidents ==
- On 14 January 1986, the AS-350 used by Dakar Rally organiser Thierry Sabine as his personal transport during the event, crashed into a sand dune in Mali. The helicopter had just taken off again after it had been forced to land in the desert by a sudden sandstorm. All five on board were killed. Among the victims were Thierry Sabine, French singer-songwriter Daniel Balavoine and pilot François-Xavier Bagnoud.
- On 22 February 1995, Massachusetts State Police helicopter N20SP carrying two troopers and two AT&T engineers crashed into the yacht club building. All on board died in the crash, which was attributed to significant operating deficiencies within the Police Air Wing which allowed contamination of the fuel bunker to go undetected.
- On 27 April, 1996, 2 Japanese AS-350 news helicopters collided mid-air over Nagano, Japan while covering a brush fire early that morning. All 6 occupants aboard both aircraft were killed.
- On 13 May 1996, a severe snowstorm took the lives of several climbers and stranded two others high atop Mount Everest. Winds were estimated as gusting up to 70 miles per hour with temperatures down to -50F. Two climbers were frostbitten and near death. Several civil helicopter operators refused the mission, but a Nepalese pilot, Madan Khatri Chhetri, attempted the risky, high-altitude rescue. Climbing nearly 3,000 feet above the service ceiling of the Ecureuil AS350 B2 helicopter, he succeeded at making the highest altitude rescue in a rotary wing aircraft -- not once, but twice.
- On 19 October 2001, a New Mexico State Police AS 350B medical helicopter suffered a mechanical failure and crashed during a training exercise, killing officers Damon Talbott and Ramon Robert Solis.
- On 27 July 2007, two AS-350 AStar helicopters from television stations KNXV-TV and KTVK collided in mid-air over Phoenix, Arizona, while covering a police pursuit.
- On 15 September 2007, former World Rally Championship driver Colin McRae and three passengers were killed when his AS350 B2 Squirrel, which he was piloting, crashed near Lanark, Scotland.
- On 8 August 2009, a Piper PA-32R collided with an AS350 over the Hudson River, with both aircraft crashing into the Hudson River. There were no survivors.
- On 10 June 2012, an AS350 B3e belonging to the Kenya Police Air Wing crashed in Kibiku area in Ngong Forest, west of Nairobi, Kenya, killing at least six people, including Kenya's Interior Security Minister George Saitoti and his deputy Orwa Ojode.
- On 30 March 2013, an Alaska State Troopers AS350 B3 N911AA impacted terrain while maneuvering during a search and rescue flight near Talkeetna, Alaska. All three onboard died.
- On 7 June 2014, a Helibrás HB-350BA crashed after takeoff, in Aruanã, Goiás state, Brazil. All on board died, including retired football player Fernandão.
- On 9 March 2015, two AS350 B3 collided mid air in La Rioja Province, Argentina, killing all 10 people on board both aircraft. The passengers, including a number of French athletes, were participants in the filming of French reality television program Dropped.
- On 3 July 2015, an Airbus Helicopters AS350 B3e helicopter operated by Air Methods Corporation crashed upon take off from Summit Medical Center Heliport, Frisco, Colorado. The pilot was fatally injured, and the two flight nurses were seriously injured.
- On 21 November 2015, an AS350BA, registration ZK-HKU, crashed near Fox Glacier, New Zealand, killing all seven people on board a tourist flight. The weather at the time was poor, with low-lying cloud and snow falling near the crash site. The investigation by the New Zealand TAIC revealed that the pilot encountered extremely poor visibility during the descent phase of the flight causing controlled flight into terrain (CFIT).
- On 5 May 2016, an AS350 registered as RP-C 6828 crashed in Sebuyau, Sarawak killing all six people including Malaysia Deputy Minister of Plantation Industries and Commodities, Noriah Kasnon and her husband, and Member of Parliament for Kuala Kangsar, Wan Mohammad Khair-il Anuar.
- On 11 March 2018, an AS350 N350LH operated by Liberty Helicopters carrying six people (five passengers and a pilot) crashed into New York City's East River after reportedly suffering engine failure. All five passengers were confirmed dead after the aircraft submerged upside down into the water. The pilot was able to free himself and was rescued by a nearby tugboat.
- On 27 February 2019, an Air Dynasty AS350 B3e helicopter crashed shortly after takeoff in Taplejung, Nepal, killing all seven people on board, including Tourism and Civil Aviation Minister Rabindra Adhikari.
- On 31 August 2019, an AS350 crashed in the mountains of Skoddevarre in Alta Municipality in northern Norway, killing all six occupants. In response to the accident, Airbus made crash-resistant fuel systems part of the standard kit for the aircraft on 1 October.
- On 7 March 2021, an AS350 carrying billionaire French politician and industrialist Olivier Dassault crashed on takeoff near Deauville (Normandy) with no survivors.
- On 27 March 2021, an AS350 carrying Czech billionaire Petr Kellner crashed at Knik Glacier (Alaska), killing five.
- On 21 February 2022 a Philippine National Police H125 serial RP-9710 crashed in Real, Quezon with one casualty on the way to Balesin Resort to pick up then PNP chief Dionardo Carlos. GSIS paid a P232 million insurance claim for the crash in Real, Quezon.
- On 1 November 2022, an AS350 B3 operated by Midtnorsk Helikopterservice crashed just outside the centre of Verdal Municipality, Trøndelag, Norway. Two people died, and one person, the pilot, survived.
- On 21 April 2024, the tail rotor of an AS350 struck and killed a passenger after he disembarked from the helicopter on Akimiski Island, Nunavut, Canada.
- On 14 June 2026, an AS350 collided with a Bell 206 in Recreio dos Bandeirantes, Rio de Janeiro killing the musician Oliver Tree, YouTuber Gaspi, and 4 others. The cause of the crash is currently under investigation.
- On 15 September 2026, an AS350, contracted by NBC owned-and-operated station KNBC and its Spanish language affiliate KVEA, operated by NBC's Telemundo, crashed during a local news gathering flight in Los Angeles, California, killing both occupants and one pedestrian on the ground.
- On 30 October 2026, an AS350 operated by Trans Bharat aviation and carrying Hindu pilgrims on the Char Dham yatra crashed near Joshimath, India. All six occupants were killed in the crash.

== Specifications (AS350 B3) ==
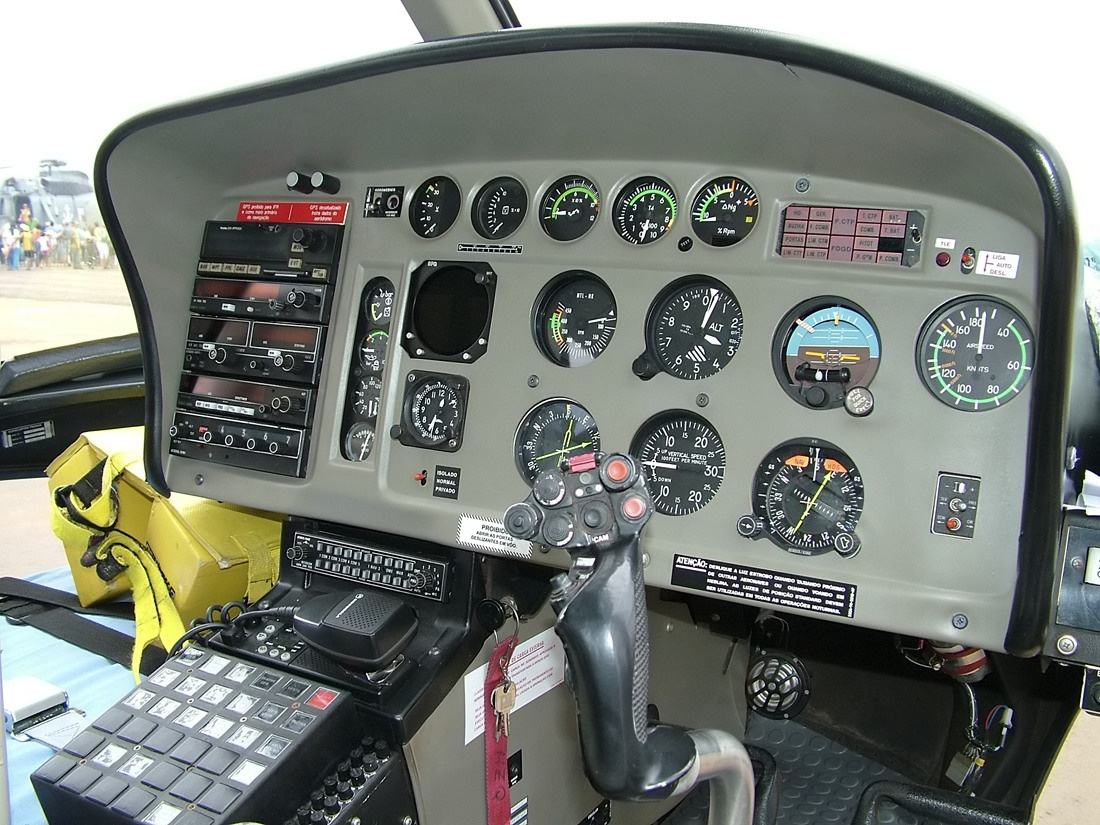
The cockpit of an AS350 B2, 2006

Data from Brassey's World Aircraft & Systems Directory 1999/2000

General characteristics

- Crew: 1
- Capacity: 5 pax

- 4, 5, & 6 passenger options available. The 6 passenger configuration replaces the single passenger forward seat with a two-person bench seat

- Length: 10.93 m (35 ft 10 in) (fuselage)
- Height: 3.145 m (10 ft 4 in)
- Empty weight: 1,174 kg (2,588 lb)
- Max takeoff weight: 2,250 kg (4,960 lb)
- Powerplant: 1 × Turbomeca Arriel 2B turboshaft engine, 632 kW (848 hp)
- Main rotor diameter: 10.7 m (35 ft 1 in)
- Main rotor area: 89.75 m^{2} (966.1 sq ft)

Performance

- Cruise speed: 245 km/h (152 mph, 132 kn)
- Never exceed speed: 287 km/h (178 mph, 155 kn)
- Range: 662 km (411 mi, 357 nmi)
- Endurance: 4 hours 6 minutes
- Service ceiling: 4,600 m (15,100 ft)
- Rate of climb: 8.5 m/s (1,670 ft/min)

Avionics
Vehicle and Engine Monitoring Display (VEMD) with First Limit Indicator (FLI) fitted as standard.

== See also ==
- Changhe Z-11
- Eurocopter AS355 Écureuil 2
- Eurocopter AS550 Fennec
- Eurocopter EC130

=== Similar aircraft ===
- AgustaWestland AW119 Koala
- Bell 206
- Bell 407
- Enstrom 480
- Kazan Ansat
- Kopter AW09
- MBB Bo 105
- MD Helicopters MD 500
- PZL SW-4 Puszczyk
