= Katar, Karnataka =

Coordinates: 31°18′N 77°26′E

Katar is a village in the Uttara Kannada district in Karnataka, India.

== See also ==
- Uttara Kannada
- Districts of Karnataka
