= GB =

GB, or Gb may refer to:

== Places ==
- United Kingdom (ISO 3166-1 code), a sovereign country situated off the north-western coast of continental Europe
  - Great Britain, an island situated off the north-western coast of continental Europe
  - Kingdom of Great Britain (1707–1800), a predecessor country of the United Kingdom
- Gilgit-Baltistan, a region in northern Pakistan
- Green Bay, Wisconsin, United States
- Great Barrington, Massachusetts, United States

== Businesses and organisations ==
- GB Airways, a British airline
- Gardner Bender, a manufacturer of professional electrician's tools and supplies
- Girls' Brigade, a Christian organization for girls
- Grande Bibliothèque, a large public library in Montreal
- University of Wisconsin–Green Bay, an American university
- ABX Air (IATA airline designator GB), a cargo airline
- GB Glace, a Swedish ice cream company
- Griesedieck Brothers beer, an American beer brand
- GB Supermarkets, a Belgian chain that was eventually taken over by Carrefour
- GB News, a British television news channel

== Science and technology ==
=== Computing and electronics ===
- Gigabit (Gb), a unit of information used, for example, to quantify computer memory or storage capacity
- Gigabyte (GB), a unit of information used, for example, to quantify computer memory or storage capacity
- Gain–bandwidth product, product of amplifier midband gain and bandwidth
- Game Boy, a handheld video game console
- Guobiao standards, Chinese National Standards
  - GB 2312, an encoding scheme for rendering Simplified Chinese characters; also has partial support for Traditional, and some other languages, though in practice web browser support it as (i.e. with full support):
  - GB 18030, an encoding scheme for rendering Simplified Chinese characters, but with full support for Traditional, and all languages Unicode supports, since it is a full Unicode Transformation Format

=== Military technology ===
- Beechcraft GB Traveler, U.S. Navy aircraft
- Steyr GB, an Austrian semi-automatic handgun
- Sarin (NATO designation GB), a nerve gas
- GB-1, a World War II American glide bomb
- GB PGB, a series of Chinese precision guided bombs

=== Other uses in science and technology ===
- Ganglion blocker, a medication
- Gigabase (Gb), a unit of length for DNA
- Gilbert (unit) (Gb), a unit of magnetization named for English physicist William Gilbert
- Government and binding theory, in linguistics, by Noam Chomsky
- Guillain–Barré syndrome, an acute inflammatory polyneuropathy

== Sport ==
- Great Britain at the Olympics, the Olympic team of the United Kingdom
- Green Bay Packers, an American football team
- Games behind, a number reflecting the gap between two sports teams

== People ==
- GB (footballer), (full name Gabriel Souza da Silva), Brazilian association footballer
- Guy Bomford, who also published as G.B.

== Other uses ==
- Gb (digraph), a digraph in the Latin alphabet
- Voiced labial–velar plosive, a consonant sound transcribed as /ɡ͡b/
- G♭ (musical note), a semitone
  - G-flat major, a key
- Group buy, buying something as a collective
- Gazerbeam, a fictional deceased superhero in the animated film The Incredibles
- Goin' Bulilit, Philippine television show

== See also ==
- BG (disambiguation)
- Gigabyte (disambiguation)
- GBS (disambiguation)
