= Breakdown structure =

Breakdown structure may refer to:

== Project management ==
In project management, these are often project components visualised in hierarchical form:

- Goals breakdown structure (GBS)
- Organizational breakdown structure (OBS), Diagram showing organizational structure
- Product breakdown structure (PBS), Tool for analysing, documenting and communicating the outcomes of a project
- Resource breakdown structure (RBS)
- Risk breakdown structure (RBS), Risk management technique
- Value breakdown structure (VBS), Project management technique
- Work breakdown structure (WBS), A deliverable-orientated breakdown of a project into smaller components

== Other ==
- Breakdown structures used to describe geodesic polyhedra
