= GBS =

GBS may refer to:

== People ==
- Guillermo Barros Schelotto, Argentine footballer and coach
- George Bernard Shaw, Irish playwright

== Education ==
- Gandaki Boarding School, in Pokhara, Nepal
- Glenbrook South High School, in Glenview, Illinois, US
- Globsyn Business School, in Kolkata, India
- Goethe Business School, Frankfurt, Germany
- Gyeonggibuk Science High School, in Uijeongbu, South Korea
- Global Banking School, United Kingdom

== Medicine ==
- Glasgow-Blatchford score, a screening tool
- Group B streptococcus
- Guillain–Barré syndrome, a muscle weakness

== Technology ==
- Game Boy Sound System, a file format
- Geostationary balloon satellite
- Global Broadcast Service, a United States military communications network
- Gravity-based structure, a support structure
- IBM Global Business Services

== Politics ==
- Gabungan Bersatu Sabah, a Sabah-based political parties coalition in Malaysia

== Military ==
- Gilgit-Baltistan Scouts, a Pakistani paramilitary force

== Other uses ==
- Gbesi language
- Genotyping by sequencing
- Gifu Broadcasting System, in Japan
- Goals breakdown structure, a hierarchical structure
- Gold Bauhinia Star, an honour of Hong Kong
- Government Buying Standards for public sector purchasing in the United Kingdom
- Gram Bharati Samiti (Society for Rural Development), India
- Grundig Business Systems, a German company
- Gugun Blues Shelter, an Indonesian music group
- Guinea-Bissau at the Olympics, IOC code GBS
- Große Berliner Straßenbahn, later Berlin Straßenbahn
- Nationality code of British Subject in the machine-readable passport
