= ProjectLibre =

Free and open-source project management software

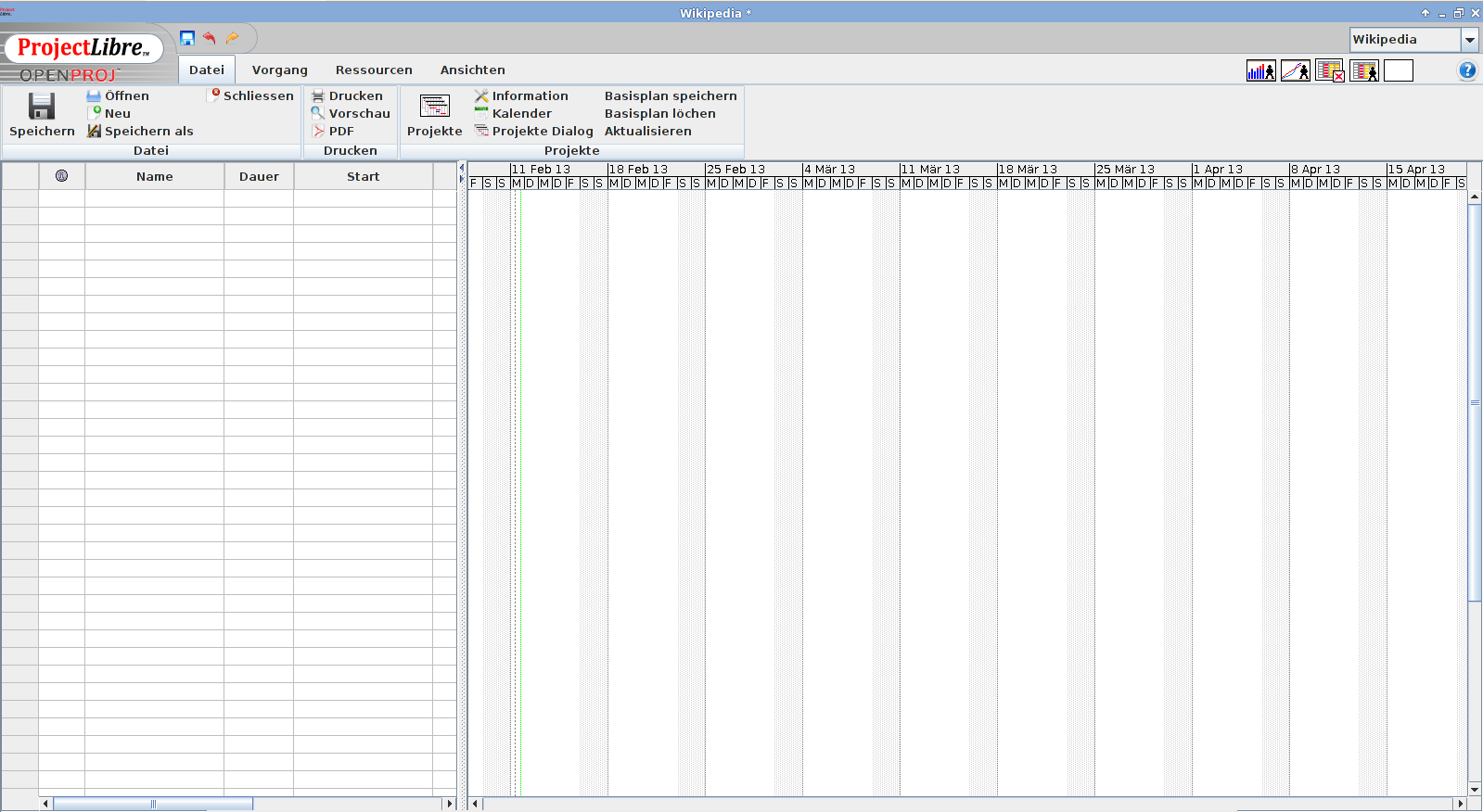
- Demonstration of the ProjectLibre GUI
- Original authors: Marc O'Brien, Laurent Chrettieneau
- Developer: ProjectLibre
- Release: August 19, 2012
- Stable release: 1.9.8 / April 28, 2025
- Written in: Java
- Operating system: Cross-platform
- Available in: 29 languages including Arabic, Chinese (simplified), Chinese (Traditional), Czech, Danish, Dutch, English, Finnish, French, Galician, German, Hindi, Italian, Japanese, Korean, Persian, Polish, Portuguese, Portuguese (Brazilian), Russian, Slovak, Spanish, Swedish, Tamil, Thai, Turkish, Ukrainian, Urdu, Vietnamese and others
- Type: Project management software
- License: Common Public Attribution License
- Website: www.projectlibre.com
- Repository: sourceforge.net/projects/projectlibre/

ProjectLibre is a project management software company with both a free open-source desktop and a Cloud AI version. ProjectLibre Cloud is a team and Artificial Intelligence solution.

ProjectLibre Cloud was released as a team and multiproject version. ProjectLibre desktop is a free and open-source project management software system intended ultimately as a standalone replacement for Microsoft Project. ProjectLibre has been downloaded 8,800,000 times in 197 countries and translated into 54 languages.

The latest release of ProjectLibre was released with extensive update for global users. On the 1st day it was downloaded in over 150 countries which is probably the most ever for a project management release. ProjectLibre has been translated into 31 languages and has users on all 7 continents. The 1.9.8 release allows project managers to select the language in a drop down list. In addition to language, the country can be chosen which also sets the project currency and date format. The new release has a 10x performance increase on many functions.

ProjectLibre Cloud runs in any browser as a SaaS solution. ProjectLibre Desktop is written in the Java programming language, and will thus theoretically run on any machine for which a fully functioning Java virtual machine (JVM) exists. Currently, ProjectLibre is certified to run on Linux, MacOS, and Microsoft Windows. It is released under the Common Public Attribution License (CPAL) and qualifies as free software according to the Free Software Foundation.

ProjectLibre's desktop initial release was in August 2012. SourceForge staff selected ProjectLibre ProjectLibre as the January 2022 "Staff Pick" Project of the Month.

ProjectLibre Cloud is a web-based project management application. ProjectLibre Cloud is a multi-user, multi-project version in the browser. It is similar to Google Docs compared to Microsoft Word. The AI allows the creation of projects with a Natural Language Prompt (NLP). The projects are created in any language. It includes project Tasks, Durations, task links and resource assignments.

== History ==
The initial release of ProjectLibre occurred in August 2012.

A SaaS version is also available which extends the desktop features with team and enterprise features.

== Products ==
=== ProjectLibre Desktop ===
ProjectLibre Desktop is a free and open-source project management software application designed for single‑user, single‑project use. It is positioned as a replacement for Microsoft Project desktop, with full compatibility for opening and saving .mpp files.

As of July 2026, the software has been downloaded more than 8.8 million times across over 197 countries. On the first day of a major new version, the release was downloaded in 150 countries. The independent textbook An Introduction to Project Management: Predictive, Agile, and Hybrid Approaches With AI by Kathy Schwalbe notes that ProjectLibre Desktop had seen over 7.7 million downloads across 193 countries and is used in over 1,700 universities, indicating widespread academic adoption. The developer confirms that the desktop version will always remain free and open source, making it suitable for students, individuals, and university environments.

=== ProjectLibre Cloud AI ===
ProjectLibre Cloud AI is a separate, SaaS‑based product developed for teams, companies, and organizations that require multi-user and multi‑project capabilities. The Schwalbe textbook describes both the desktop and cloud versions as alternatives to Microsoft Project, noting that the cloud version supports organizations managing multiple projects and portfolio management. It is offered on a subscription basis at US$9.99 per user per month and is marketed as a direct replacement for the discontinued Microsoft Project Online. ProjectLibre has now released a new verson] with full Microsoft Project level project scheduling but also now includes Resource Leveling, Monte Carlo Risk Analysis and Project Audit (DCMA).

Unlike the free desktop edition, the cloud platform supports role-based access control, enabling different permission levels for executives, project managers, team members, and viewers. It includes enterprise resource management to track and allocate personnel across multiple projects, and it can import both ProjectLibre Desktop files and Microsoft Project (.mpp) files.

The service incorporates artificial intelligence features, using machine learning to suggest task scheduling, flag potential risks, and recommend resource adjustments. The AI engine was built specifically for project management use cases and learns from project data over time. ProjectLibre Cloud AI is accessed through a web browser, stores data in the cloud, and supports collaboration across geographically distributed teams. As of 2026, the two products share a common file format for import and export.

ProjectLibre is a primary migration from Microsoft Project Online. Microsoft Project Online is end of life from September 30, 2026. Users are migrating and can open their projects and continue using ProjectLibre Cloud.

ProjectLibre Cloud has now been released in 54 languages and the website is native in English, Spanish, French, German and Portuguese.

== Features ==
The current version includes:

- Microsoft Project compatibility
- OpenOffice and LibreOffice compatibility
- Critical Path
- Earned value costing
- Gantt chart
- PERT graph only (not PERT technique)
- Resource breakdown structure (RBS) chart
- Task usage reports
- Work breakdown structure (WBS) chart
- Monte Carlo Risk Analysis
- DCMA Project Health Report
- Artificial Intelligence (AI)
- Resource Leveling
- Portfolio

== Comparison to Microsoft Project ==
ProjectLibre has 2 products that set out to closely emulate Microsoft Project. The Cloud version is compared to Microsoft Project Online, and the Desktop version to Microsoft Project Desktop. The Cloud is for teams and similar Gantt Chart, Network Diagram, WBS, Resource Leveling and advanced features for teams. Compared to Microsoft Project, which it closely emulates, ProjectLibre has a similar user interface (UI) including a ribbon-style menu, and a similar approach to construction of a project plan: create an indented task list or work breakdown structure (WBS), set durations, create links (either by (a) mouse drag, (b) selection and then button-down, or (c) manually type in the "predecessor" column), assign resources. The columns (fields) look the same as for Microsoft Project. Costing features are comparable: labour, hourly rate, material usage, and fixed costs: these are all provided.

== ProjectLibre improvements ==
- Cloud is for teams
- Cloud has multi-project and resource leveling across the enterprise
- Cloud has enterprise resource management
- Cloud has advanced AI
- Full compatibility with Microsoft Project 2010, import/export capability
- Printing
- PDF exporting (without any restrictions)
- Ribbon user interface
- Many bug fixes and correction of issues that OpenProj encounters that are mentioned above

== See also ==
- Comparison of project management software
- Microsoft Project
- OpenProj
