= OpenProj =

Open-source project management software

- Demonstration of the OpenProj GUI
- Original authors: Marc O'Brien, Howard Katz, Laurent Chrettieneau
- Developer: Projity
- Initial release: August 6, 2007
- Final release: 1.3 / August 11, 2008; 17 years ago
- Preview release: 1.4 / October 2, 2008; 17 years ago
- Repository: sourceforge.net/projects/openproj/
- Written in: Java
- Operating system: Cross-platform
- Successor: ProjectLibre
- Available in: English
- Type: Project management software
- License: Common Public Attribution License
- Website: https://web.archive.org/web/20081217014714/http://openproj.org/ (archived 2008)

OpenProj was an open-source project management software application.

It has not been updated since 2008 and is not supported. Serena Software asked users to use ProjectLibre instead.

== History and status ==
Marc O'Brien, Howard Katz, and Laurent Chretienneau developed OpenProj at Projity in 2007. It moved out of beta with Version 1.0 on January 10, 2008.

In late 2008, Projity was acquired by Silver Lake Partners (the private equity firm) via its subsidiary at that time, Serena Software.

In November 2008, support and development of OpenProj appeared suspended. There were a few later commits to the CVS with regressions, but no improvements. It is no longer compatible with Microsoft Project.

Serena/Projity also developed a software as a Service (SaaS) project software, Projects On Demand. (Projects On Demand service ended on June 11, 2011.)

In 2012, the founders of OpenProj announced that they had forked the OpenProj codebase and started a different implementation.

Serena announced and posted online to avoid downloading OpenProj and instead download ProjectLibre.

The initial release of ProjectLibre occurred in August 2012. ProjectLibre has been completely rewritten and thus technically ceased to be a fork.

== Features ==
The current version includes:

- Earned value costing
- Gantt charts
- PERT graphs
- Resource breakdown structure (RBS) charts
- Task usage reports
- Work breakdown structure (WBS) charts

== Popularity ==
It has been downloaded over 4,000,000 times in over 142 countries. Three months after the beta version release, on SourceForge an average of 60,000 copies a month were downloaded. With a SourceForge activity percentile of 99.964, at number 15 it was listed just ahead of the popular messaging application Pidgin. In May 2008 the total number of downloads on SourceForge reached 500,000.

== Bugs ==
OpenProj has not been supported for over 10 years. Serena software previously issued a warning and asked users to use ProjectLibre. As of version 1.4, bugs in the software generally only manifest for users who are attempting more advanced features. For example, tasks may mysteriously start at a certain time (they behave as if they have a 'Start no earlier than' constraint even though none exists, and the project start date is not a constraint), links show gaps, fixed cost for summary tasks neither sums nor is editable, etc. Sometimes these errors are solved by restarting the software, but others are persistent.

Compared to Microsoft Project, which it closely emulates, OpenProj has a similar user interface (UI), and a similar approach to construction of a project plan: create an indented task list or work breakdown structure (WBS), set durations, create links (either by (a) mouse drag, (b) selection and then button-down, or (c) manually type in the "predecessor" column), assign resources. The columns (fields) are the same as for Microsoft Project. Users of either software should be broadly comfortable using the other. Costs are the same: labour, hourly rate, material usage, and fixed costs: these are all provided.

However, there are small differences in the UI (comments apply to version 1.4), which take some adaptation for those familiar with Microsoft Project, i.e. OpenProj can't link upward with method (c), inserting tasks is more difficult than in Microsoft Project, and OpenProj can't create resources on the fly (have to create them first in the resource sheet). There are also several more serious limitations with OpenProj, the chief of these being the unavailability of more detailed views and reports typical of Microsoft Project. For example, though the fields exist for cost, there is no quick way to show them other than to manually insert them. This requires a relatively advanced user: someone who knows what the fields might be called and how to use them.

== Licensing ==
Some features of OpenProj are limited to users acquiring a purchased license; for those users using OpenProj for free, a slightly limited feature set is provided. For example, OpenProj(v1.4) does not allow the in-house exporting of PDF output, though the usefulness of such a feature is questionable. It is possible to circumvent the reduced feature set using external software, though as with all paid software, donation or purchase is appreciated by the developers.

=== ProjectLibre ===
The original founders of OpenProj started to develop a complementary Cloud version called ProjectLibre in 2012, comparable to Microsoft Project Server for Microsoft Project. During development they realized, that the fact that OpenProj had not been updated anymore by Serena Software for 12 years would become problematic to their goal, so they needed to rewrite the program.

== See also ==
- Comparison of project management software
- Microsoft Project
- ProjectLibre
