= Gigabyte (disambiguation) =

The gigabyte (GB) is 1000^{3} bytes.

Gigabyte may also refer to:

- Gibibyte (GiB), 1024^{3} bytes, also called "gigabyte" (GB)
- Gigabyte (virus writer), moniker of Kimberley Vanvaeck, for computer viruses
- Gigabyte Technology, a Taiwanese computer hardware manufacturer
- Gigabyte (journal), an open-science journal
- Gigabyte, a fictional character from the CG animated children's TV show ReBoot

== See also ==
- Giga Bite (character), a fictional video game character from the game Resident Evil Outbreak: File 2
- Gigabit (Gb), 10^{9} bits
- Gibibit (Gib), 2^{30} bits
- GB (disambiguation)
- Giga (disambiguation)
- Byte (disambiguation)
