= Nogger =

Ice lolly made by Langnese

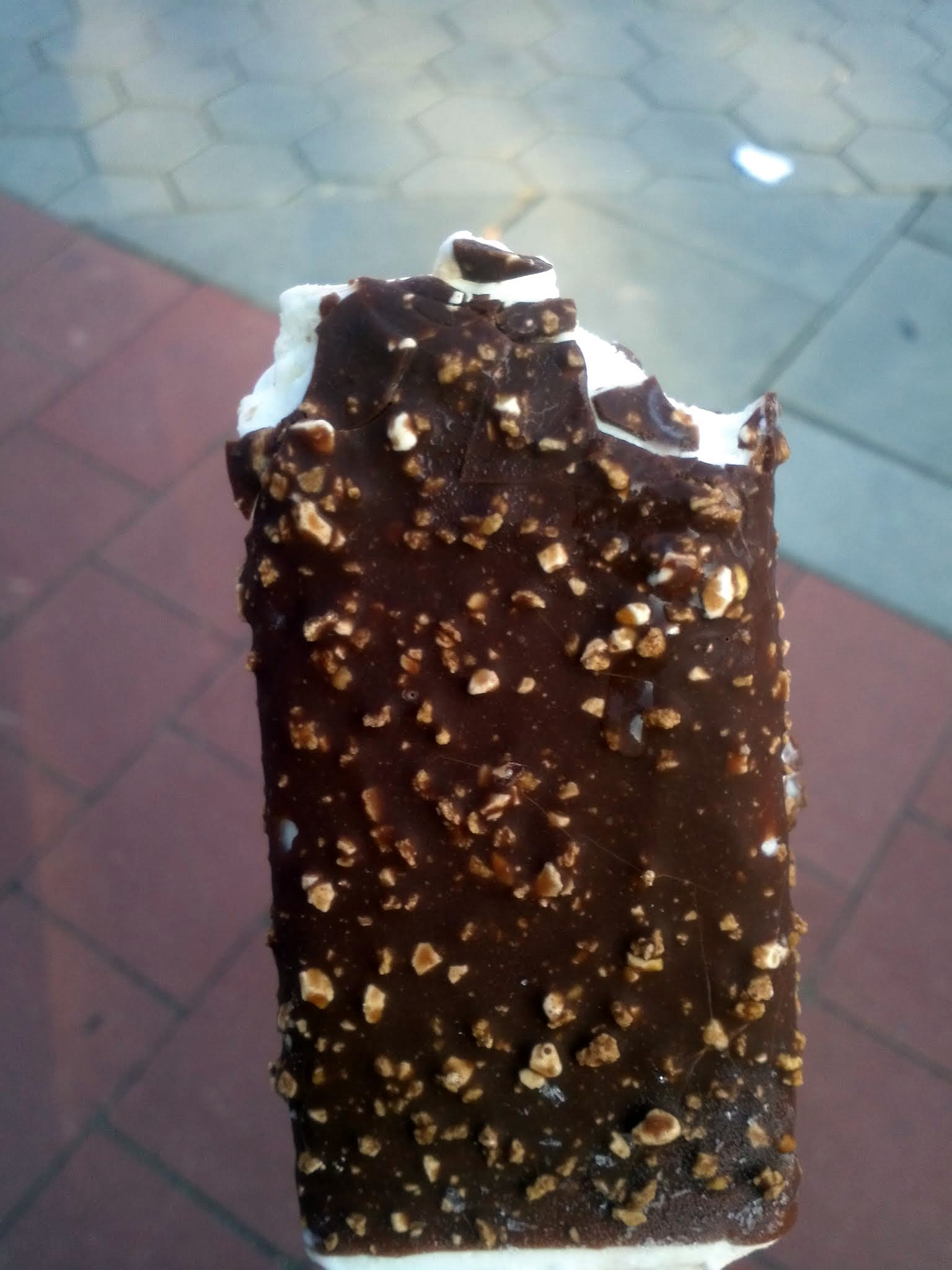
- A Nogger ice lolly
- Product type: Ice cream
- Current owner: Unilever
- Produced by: Langnese
- Country: Germany
- Introduced: 1964

Nogger is a brand of ice cream bar mainly made of vanilla ice cream, hard chocolate and nuts. It was first introduced in West Germany in 1964, making it one of the oldest ice cream brands of Unilever.

== Products ==
The original "Nogger" product is a vanilla and chocolate ice cream with a coating of cocoa glaze, hazelnuts and rusk pieces. A Nogger weighs 69 grams and has an energy value of 870 kilojoules (210 kilocalories). It is made from fat icing, hazelnut and rusk pieces, skimmed milk, vegetable fat, low-fat cocoa, wheat flour, emulsifier, salt and flavorings. Later Nogger products include:

- Nogger Choc – introduced in 1986; it has a nut nougat cream core and dark chocolate ice cream. This core was initially soft and was replaced by a hard chocolate core in the 1990s. From 2001 to 2008, this ice cream was not available. In 2008 there was a re-release of Nogger Choc after a group on the social network StudiVZ campaigned for its reintroduction. Having an energy value of 938 kilojoules (226 kilocalories), a Nogger Choc weighs 66 grams. It is an ice cream with vanilla flavor and nougat cream filling (16%), cocoa-based fat icing (16%) with white nougat (2%) and rusk pieces (2%), similar to Nogger.
  - Cremissimo Nogger Choc – variation of Nogger Choc sold under the Cremissimo brand (a German subsidiary brand of Langnese, itself one of many Unilever brands) in one-liter-containers.
- Nogger Riegel – caramel filling instead of the nut nougat core.
- Nogger Toffee/Caramel – sold in Slovakia and the Czech Republic, similar to Nogger Riegel.
- Nogger Cherry – variation of Nogger with a cherry core. Previously sold in the Czech Republic.
- Nogger Sandwich – variation of Nogger that is surrounded by two cookies. Originates in Albania, but was also sold in Germany and Turkey.
- Nogger Black –in 2005, Nogger Black with licorice flavor was introduced in Sweden, but was withdrawn for 2007. It looked like regular Nogger, but was black with a little crisp in the coating and filled with licorice cream. In April 2005, the organization Center Against Racism claimed that GB's advertising campaign for Nogger Black was racist. GB had then started an advertising campaign where "Nogger" "Black" was written in graffiti style. Another variant of the advertisement conveyed an image with the text "Nogger + licorice = true" written in white chalk on asphalt with a heart symbol. Stig Wallin, chairman of the Center against Racism, stated that he read the advertising message as "Nigger + licorice = true". American journalist Timothy Noah at Slate magazine believed that the name was an expression of race-baiting (use of offensive language in order to whip up anger).
- Nogger Mint – released in 2009.

== Advertising ==
For several decades following its 1964 introduction, the ice cream was marketed in Germany under the slogan "Nogger dir einen!" The campaign achieved widespread recognition but also drew public notoriety due to its unintentional double entendre, as the phrase colloquially sounded similar to German slang for masturbation. Although the tagline became a notable cultural artifact of 1980s German advertising, Langnese subsequently discontinued its use, and it is no longer featured on the product's packaging.

== See also ==
- GB Glace
- List of Unilever brands
