= Gram Bharati Samiti =

Indian non-governmental organisation

The GBS Logo

Gram Bharati Samiti (GBS) or Society for Rural Development is an Indian non-governmental organisation working in the Jaipur district of Rajasthan with the aim of "establishing a society based on humanitarian, democratic values and ecologically balanced habitat".

Gram Bharati Samiti is accredited by the United Nations Convention to Combat Desertification (UNCCD) process.

== History ==
The organisation was established in the year 1984. The organisation has initiated a model afforestation project on wasteland development named "GANDHIVAN" in village Todaladi in Jaipur district. Around 80,000 trees of various species, restoring rain water harvesting structures, stabilizing sand dunes, conserving soil and moisture successfully were some of the initiatives under project which was recognized widely and conferred with following awards:

- Van Vistarak Puraskar, by the MoEFCC, Government of Rajasthan
- Ford Conservation and Environment Award by the Ford India Co.
- Indira Priyadarshini Vrikshamitra Puraskar by the MoEFCC, Government of India
- UNDP included in the success stories of wastelands development
- The delegation of SAARC Countries called it a model projects on wastelands development

GBS has also been engaged in projects involving restoration of step wells and reviving traditional water harvesting structures like old dried wells and step wells which helps in solving the safe drinking water problems in village communities and resuscitate the age old cultural heritage of India which had been flourishing along these water structures for many years. The initiative was widely appreciated and published in some International Journals e.g. Current World Archaeology (Stepping down restoring forgotten ancient step wells of Rajasthan-issue No. 69) and Heritage (Indian step wells - April, 2016).

== Stabilizing Sand Dunes ==
Sixty five sand dunes had been stabilized which checked the process of desertification which resulted in reduced sand storms frequencies in the area and helped regeneration of hacked plants and indigenous species.

By plugging thirty deep gullies and ravines the plugging gullies soil and moisture were conserved. Also the fuel wood for around 1000 community of the area by growing thousands of bushes and shrubs in the gullies which resulted in growth of green fodder and fuel wood.

GBS has performed the nature friendly activities in the following innovative ways:

1. The procedure used for stabilizing sand dunes and plugging gullies is a new method for the area.
2. Around 1,00,000 plants of indigenous species were planted over sand dunes for the first time in area.
3. Step well of around more than 1000 years had been restored.
4. Self Help Group (SHG) women of village communities were developed with leadership qualities.
5. The projects of GBS were widely recognized and conferred with several national/international awards and appreciation.

== Environmental and Climate Impacts ==
Conifer plantations are known for enhancing the degree of dry, wet and occult deposition through the scavenging process which then passes through the canopy and contributes to enhanced soil and freshwater acidification. The ability of trees to intercept or scavenge atmospheric deposition depends on factors like the leaf area, woodland height, canopy structure, leaf shape and elevation and hence the afforestation done by GBS had a greater effect on the environment of area. Plantations done by GBS project met a combination of the following climate improving features:

1. Poverty reduction and vulnerability.
2. Enhancing the livelihood capacities of local people.
3. Reducing green house gases.
4. Bio diversity conservation and the functioning of ecosystem.
5. Empowering the local people and capacity development.
6. Sustainable development with coherence from local strategies.
7. Synergies with objectives of international instruments and convention.
