= GB Glace =

Swedish ice cream company

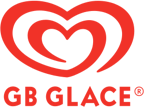
- Formerly: Glace-Bolaget
- Predecessor: Alaska Glace; Choklad-Thule; Mjölkcentralen
- Founded: 1942
- Products: Ice cream
- Parent: The Magnum Ice Cream Company

GB Glace (originally Glace-Bolaget until 1991) is the largest ice cream company in Sweden. It was founded in 1942 and after they had become a partner in 1973, was eventually fully purchased by the British company Unilever in 1996; the present owners are The Magnum Ice Cream Company.

== History ==
=== Early history ===
Ice cream has been produced in Sweden since the late 1920s. Stockholm’s first ice cream manufacturer was called Choklad-Thule. In Uppsala, the company Fyris started ice cream production in the early 1930s but declared bankruptcy in 1933. Until 1934, Pressbyrån collaborated with Choklad-Thule on the delivery of ice cream. In the same year, the company terminated the agreement and began its production with Fyri’s old machines. This became the basis for Alaska Glace in Stockholm.

The company Mjölkcentralen (MC) started ice cream production in 1934, after Eric Wilhelm Hanner, son of one of the managers at Mjölkcentralen, came back from studying the production of ice cream in various countries, among them Denmark, Switzerland and the USA. He convinced the management that the production was a good way for Mjölkcentralen to utilize the surplus of milk fat that had been thrown away until then.

The first factory was built on Mjölkcentralen’s own premises in Stockholm and completed before the spring season of 1935. The cost of the factory and all machines was SEK 245,000. MC’s ice cream was named Puck and was first sold in March of the same year. Also in 1935, another company, Igloo Glace, started in Märsta. Fierce competition eventually led to a merger between Igloo and MC.

=== Glace-Bolaget ===
At the end of 1941, there were a total of four ice cream manufacturers in Stockholm. In 1942, Mjölkcentralen’s ice cream department and Choklad-Thule merged to buy Alaska Glace. The new company was named Glace-Bolaget (GB). Eric W. Hanner was elected the company’s first CEO, a position he held until his retirement in 1972.

During World War II, most ingredients for the production of ice cream were rationed and GB was forced to drastically reduce fat content and find replacements.

1955 was the year when ice cream broke through as a mass-market product in Sweden. GB increased production but was forced to import ice cream from Denmark to satisfy the increased demand. Two years later, in 1957, Scandinavia’s largest ice cream factory was inaugurated in Flen.

Gallery with photos for the Glace-Bolaget customer magazine taken by photographer Rolf Hintze in 1958.

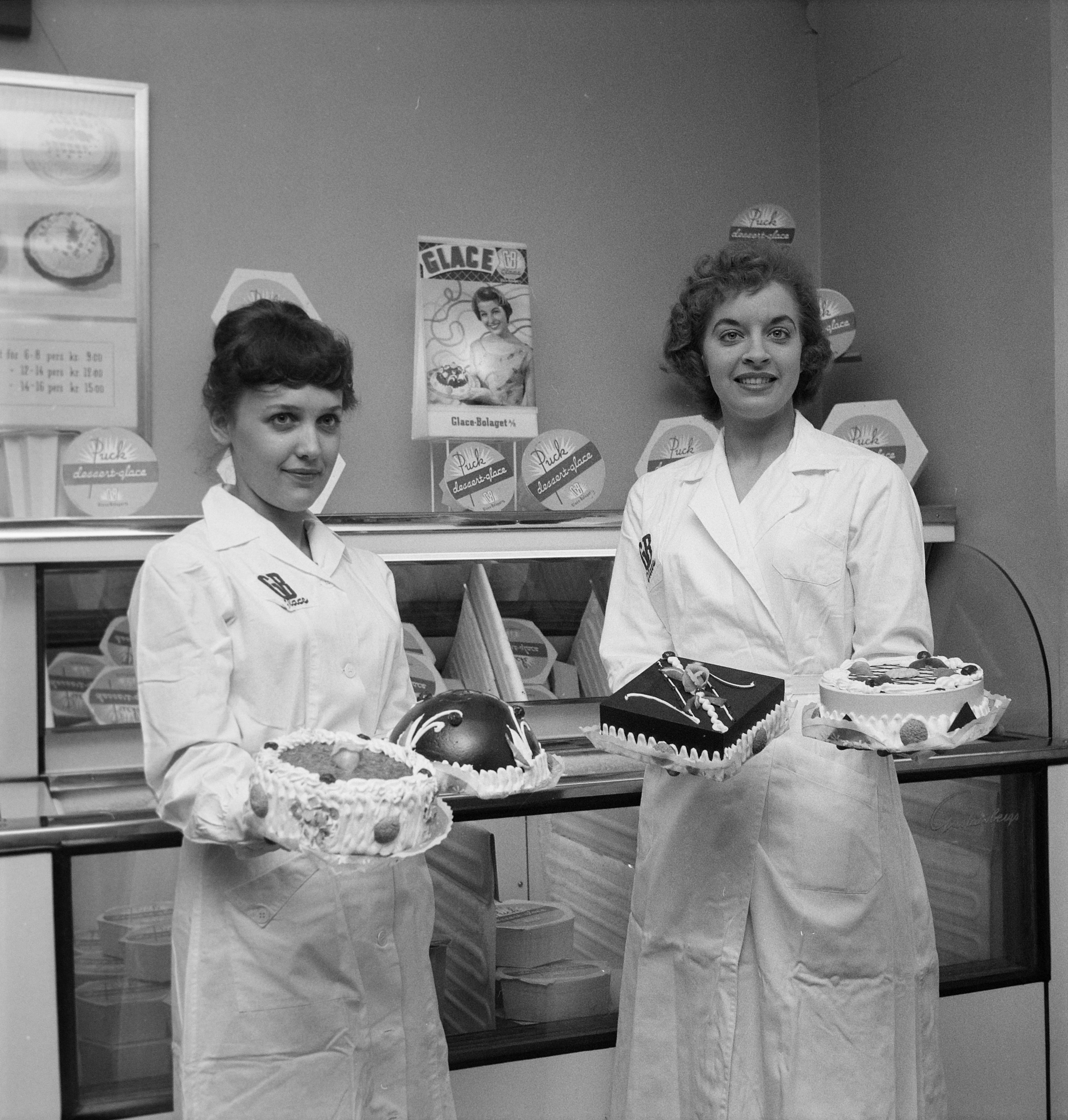
Ice cream cakes.

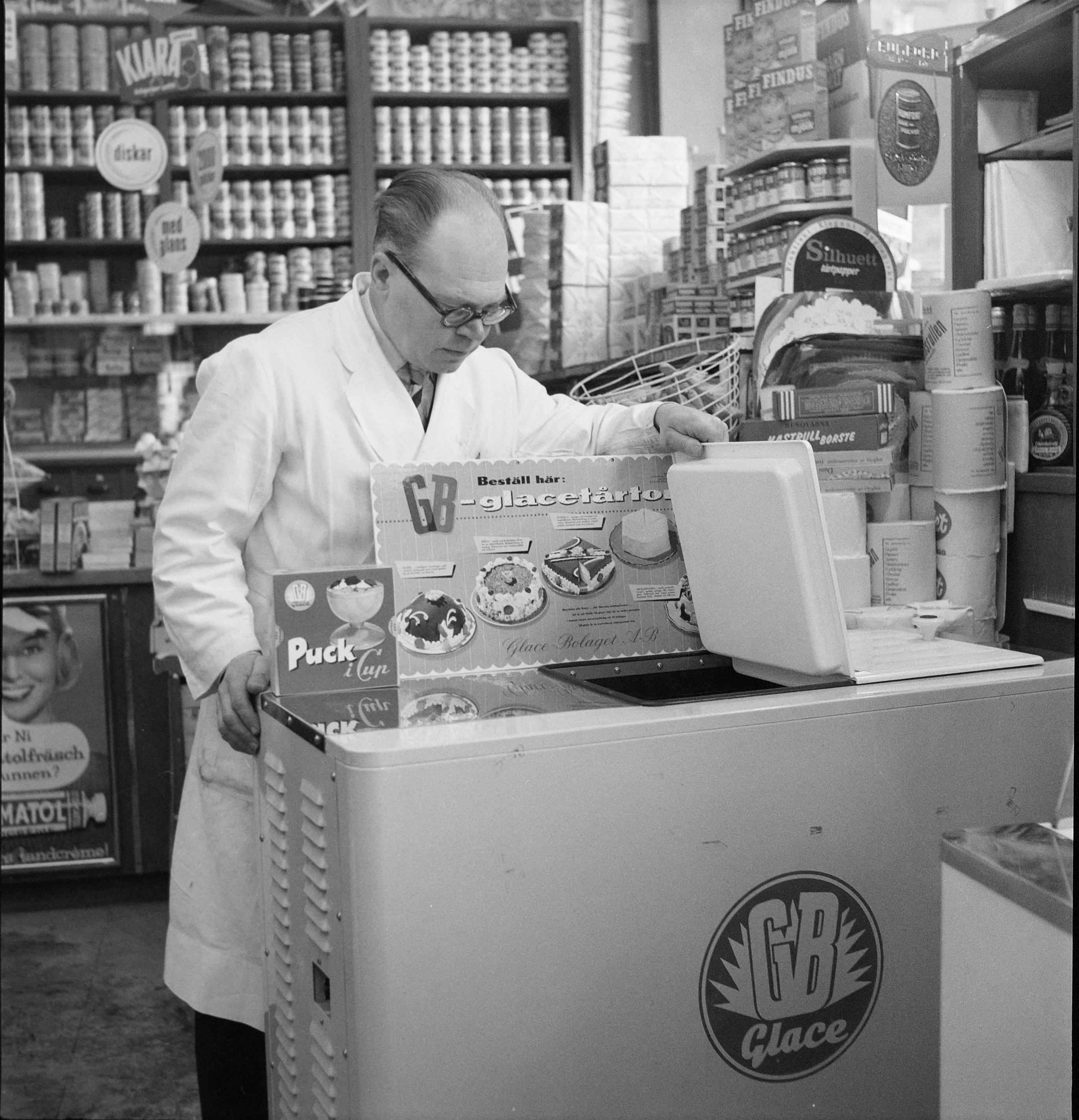
Ice cream freezer.

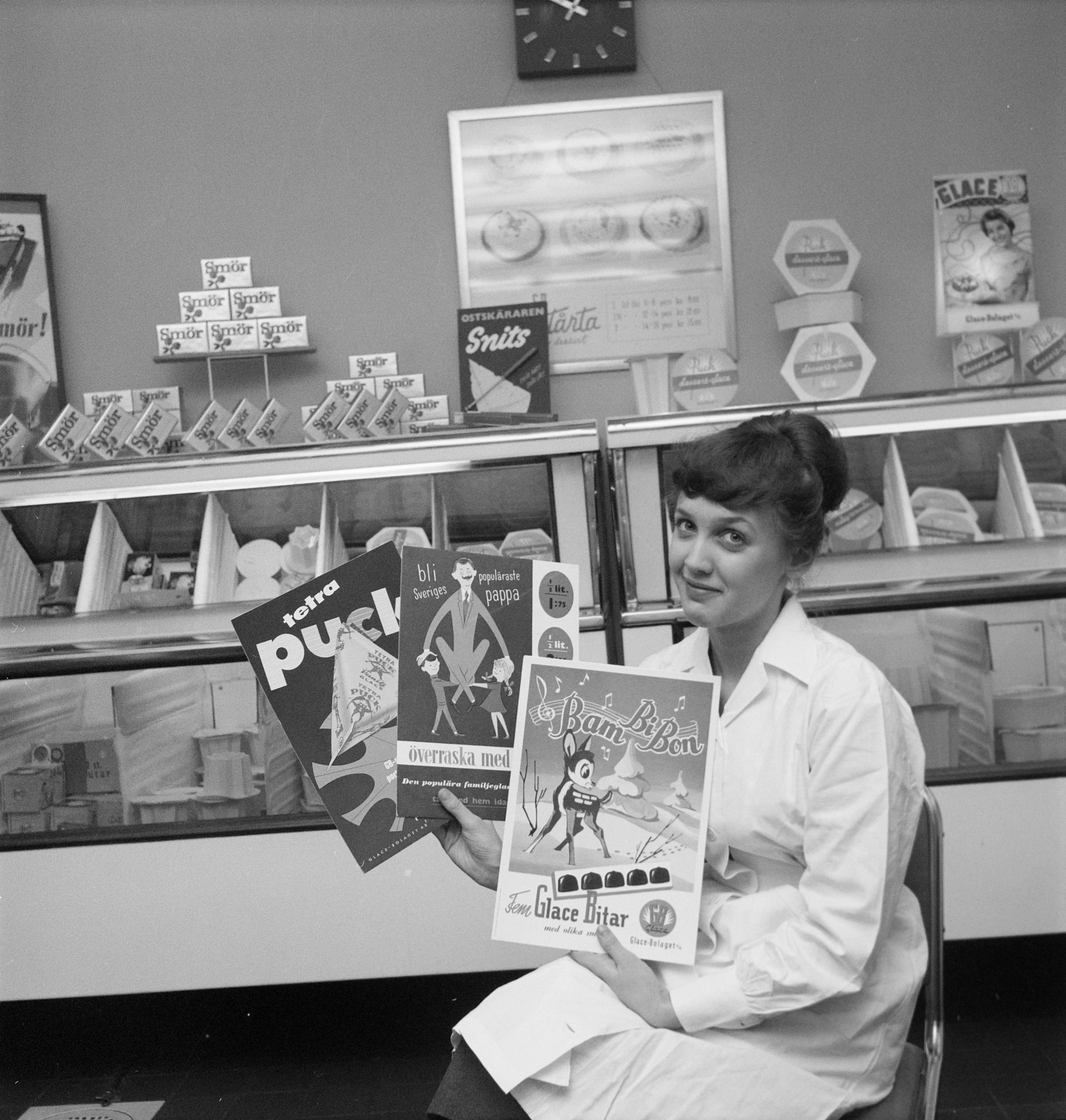
Advertisements for ice cream.

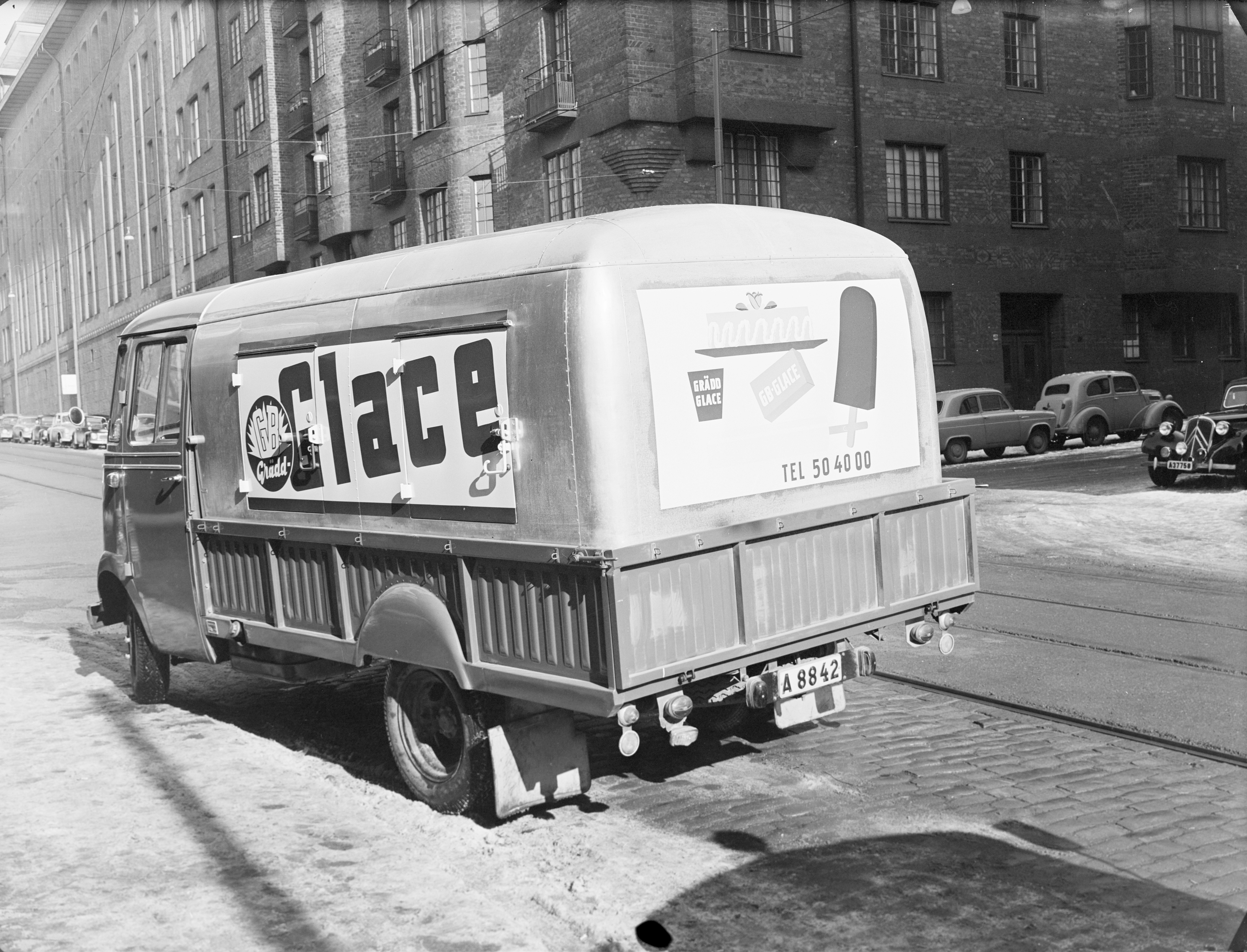
Ice cream delivery truck.

=== Mergers and acquisitions ===
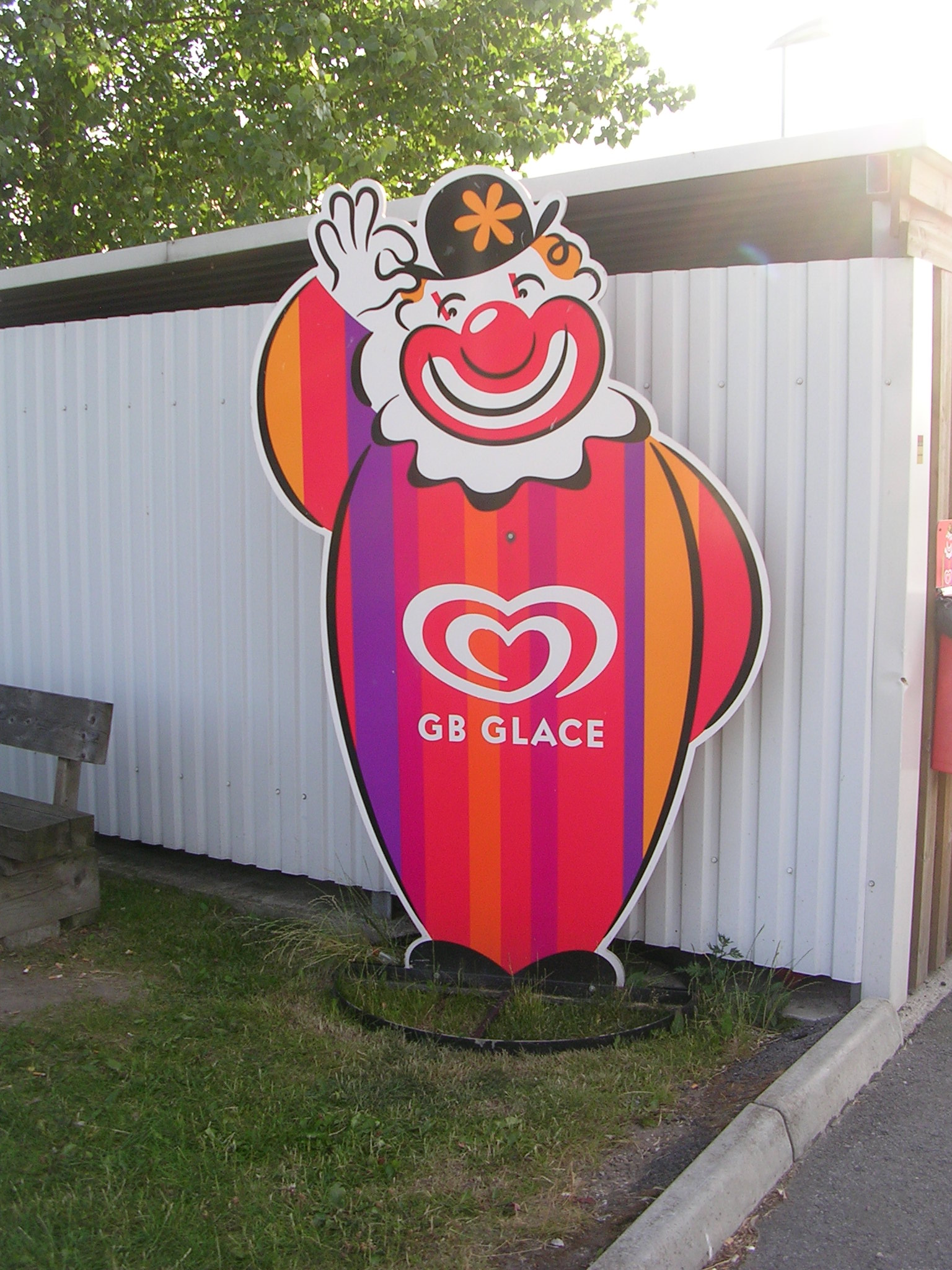
“GB-gubben”, the company mascot. Initially created in 1965 to market a single ice cream called Pajaspinne, the clown eventually became a symbol for the whole company.

GB’s competitors Gille-Glace and Trollhätteglass were acquired by Unilever in 1962. The following year, the six dairy-owned ice cream companies Arla Glass (Gothenburg), Cupglass (Örebro), Freja Glass (Gävle), Nordan Glass (Luleå) and Solglass (Karlstad) merged with GB. This meant that GB was found in almost all of Sweden, with the exception of southern Sweden. GB came to southern Sweden in 1966 and after a merger with Malmö Glass and Åhus Glass; the company was distributed nationwide.

In 1972, Strands Glass AB was acquired, including a factory in Öjebyn outside Piteå. In 1973, Glace-Bolaget merged with Trollhätteglass and Unilever became a partner in the new company.

=== Unilever ===
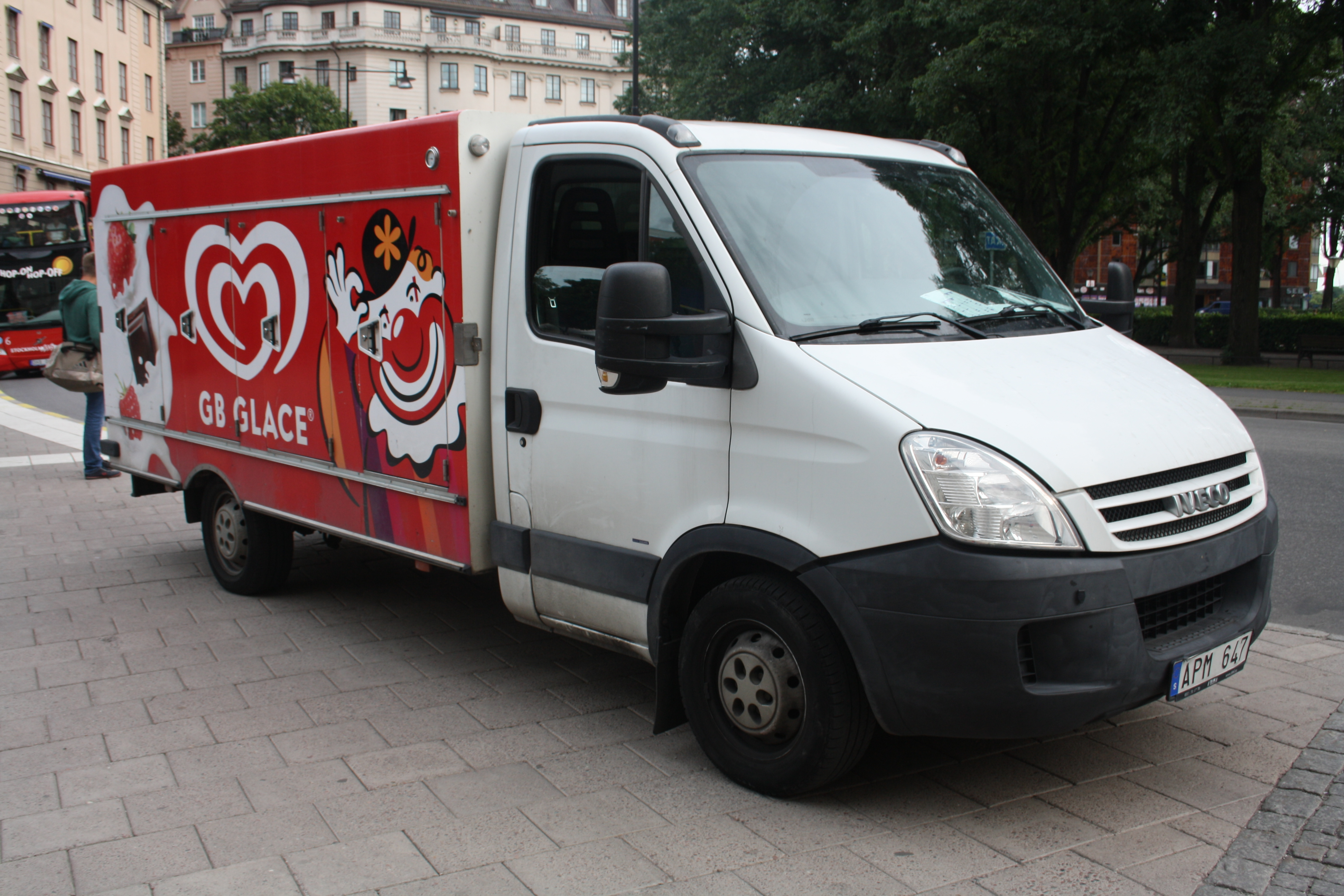
Car with GB Glace advertisement.

In 1985, GB's parent company Arla decided to sell Glace-Bolaget to Unilever but retained ten percent of the shares. When Unilever took over in 1985, the Flen plant was extensively rebuilt and reopened. The company was called Glace-Bolaget from the beginning, but the GB Glace brand was so well known that in 1991 the company changed its name to GB Glace. In 1994, GB Glace came to Finland. They also tried to enter the Norwegian ice cream market but failed.

At the beginning of 1996, GB Glace became a wholly owned subsidiary of Unilever. In 1998, GB Glace replaced its logo, now featuring the heart, which is common to all of Unilever’s ice cream brands.

In 2005, the Swedish company was criticized by the Centre against Racism and Related Intolerance after launching an advertising campaign introducing their new line of ice cream bars, the Nogger Black, which is an addition to their existing "Nogger" ice cream product. The Nogger has been marketed since 1979, its name derived from the nougat filling. The criticism was mainly aimed at an advert where the slogan "Nogger + liquorice = ♥" was written in white chalk on asphalt. Stig Wallin, chairman of the centre, misread the slogan as "Nigger + liquorice" and said: "It's impossible not to see this as an allusion to racism". The centre urged for a boycott of the company if it did not withdraw the campaign.

In 2011, the Finnish competitor Ingman Ice Cream was bought by Unilever. In 2013, the operations were integrated, and GB Glace ceased to exist as a brand in Finland.

== Products and services ==
Besides its traditional brands, it now produces many of the same products as other Unilever Heartbrand subsidiaries, such as Langnese in Germany.
