= Goals breakdown structure =

The goals breakdown structure (GBS) is a hierarchical structure linking high-level objectives or goals to more detailed goals. The GBS was originally developed for project management, but applies to product development and the organization as a whole. The concept is based on the Work Breakdown Structure (WBS) popular in the project management discipline. Like the WBS, project goals exhibit a hierarchical structure. The highest-level defines the overall goal or mission for the project. The next level down sets the goals the organization intends to achieve from the project. These might include such items as profit, market share, etc. The next layer down defines the features the products must exhibit to achieve the organization's goals. The next layer down defines the specifications each product or component of the product must have to meet the products features.

It also follows similar rules as the WBS as noted by the Project Management Institute's standard for project management, A Guide to the Project Management Body of Knowledge (PMBOK). Similar to the WBS, the purpose of the GBS is to define all the goals and only the goals in a project needed to achieve the project's higher-level goals.

== History ==
The GBS is the culmination of three concepts: the hierarchical relationship of product development, the work breakdown structure and requirements traceability.

The concept of a hierarchical relationship among objectives in product development was identified by Joseph M. Juran in Juran's Quality Control Handbook where he states in section 2.2, subsection Hierarchy of Product Features, "Products exist in a sort of hierarchical or pyramidal organization. At the apex is the overall product or system. Below the apex are multiple layers made up of subsystems, components, etc. At each layer, the products have features which must be defined by specifications and procedures." The project work that creates the product, therefore, contains similar characteristics.

Requirements traceability also became popular in the mid 1980s, particularly regarding medium and large-scale government projects. The idea of requirements traceability is to demonstrate the need for a particular project requirement or work element by showing how it is needed to achieve particular goals.

The work breakdown structure is a hierarchical decomposition of the work to be done in a project.

The term "goal breakdown structure" was coined by Stephen Gershenson, working with Michael B Bender and Stuart Syme in the late 1990s. The concept was first presented in project management seminars during this period. The first publication introducing the GBS was in Bender's first book: Setting Goals and Expectations. Bender embellished on the topic in his second book, A Manager's Guide to Project Management In the latter publication, Bender expanded the concept to apply to the organization as a whole, based partly on the works of David P. Norton and Robert S. Kaplin in The Balanced Scorecard.

== Structure and rules ==
=== Rules ===
The GBS follows two rules for decomposition.

1. Nothing missing. Each layer must contain all the goals needed to ensure the project achieves the next higher level goals.
2. Nothing extra. No layer should contain any extraneous goals; goals not needed to achieve the layer above.

The first rule ensures success of the layer above. The second rule prevents the project from exhibiting extra scope and work that doesn't add value to the organization, saving time and money.

=== Structure ===
While the specific implementation of the GBS may vary from project to project, the classic implementation contains four layers or tiers. These are:

- Project goal or mission statement
- Business objectives
- Project requirements
- Product specifications

==== Project goal or mission statement ====
In the original work, the highest level of the goals breakdown structure is the project's goal or mission statement. This layer exhibits slightly different characteristics to the other tiers as its primary objective differs. The goal of the project mission or goal statement is to maintain the focus of the project team and stakeholders. Therefore, it is the one layer of the GBS that is not all-inclusive (it violates the Nothing Missing rule).

==== Business objectives ====
The next layer down contains the business objectives for the project. This is a list of objectives the organization's senior management expects from the project. Often, these objectives tie directly to the organization's strategic plan and include such items as: Return on Investment (ROI), Net Present Value (NPV), market share, efficiency improvement, etc. This is the first layer that must satisfy both rules.

==== Project requirements ====
The third tier contains the project's requirements. This is a list of both project and product characteristics required to achieve the business objectives. These include all the features, functions and characteristics that the project's deliverables must exhibit to achieve the business objectives. This also includes all the project's operational requirements and constraints needed by senior management. For larger programs, this tier may contain more than one layer. For example:

- Program layer
  - Project layer
    - Sub-project layer

==== Product specifications ====
This tier identifies all the specifications for the project's products. This tier may contain more than one layer as show below:

- Product specifications
  - Component specifications
    - Sub-component specifications
