= Resource breakdown structure =

In project management, the resource breakdown structure (RBS) is a hierarchical list of resources related by function and resource type that is used to facilitate planning and controlling of project work. The Resource Breakdown Structure includes, at a minimum, the personnel resources needed for successful completion of a project, and preferably contains all resources on which project funds will be spent, including personnel, tools, machinery, materials, equipment and fees and licenses. Money is not considered a resource in the RBS; only those resources that will cost money are included.

== Definition ==
Assignable resources, such as personnel, are typically defined from a functional point of view: "who" is doing the work is identified based on their role within the project, rather than their department or role within the parent companies. In some cases, a geographic division may be preferred. Each descending (lower) level represents an increasingly detailed description of the resource until small enough to be used in conjunction with the work breakdown structure (WBS) to allow the work to be planned, monitored and controlled.

=== Example ===
In common practice, only non-expendable (i.e., durable goods) resources are listed in an RBS. Example of hierarchies of resources:

1. Engineering
   1.1 Mr. Fred Jones, Manager
         1.1.2 Ms. Jane Wagner, Architectural Lead
         1.1.3 Software Design Team and Resources
               1.1.3.1 Mr. Gary Neimi, Software Engineer 
               1.1.3.2 Ms. Jackie Toms, UI Designer
               1.1.3.3 Standard Time Timesheet (timesheet and project tracking software)
               1.1.3.4 Microsoft Project (project scheduling)
               1.1.3.5 SQL Server (database)
         1.1.4 Hardware Architecture Team and Resources
               1.1.4.1 Ms. Korina Johannes, Resource Manager
               1.1.4.2 Mr. Yan Xu, Testing Lead
               1.1.4.3 Test Stand A
                       1.1.4.3.1 SAN Group A
                       1.1.4.3.2 Server A1
               1.1.4.4 Test Stand B
                       1.1.4.4.1 SAN Group B
                       1.1.4.4.2 Server B1

Both human and physical resources, such as software and test instruments, are listed in the example above. The nomenclature is a numbered, hierarchical list of indented layers, each level adds an additional digit representing. For example, the numeric labels (1.1, 1.1.2) make each resource uniquely identifiable.

== Use in Microsoft Project ==
The RBS (also known as the User Breakdown Structure) fields in a Project file are specifically coded by the administrator of that project, usually the Project Manager. Sometimes a PM Administrator is designated in larger project who will manage the Project tool itself. This field is called the Enterprise Resource Outline Code and it falls into one of two categories, RBS (resource field) and RBS (assignment field). These are high-level fields that require managers who know what these will be used for in terms of the organization.

== See also ==
- Business architecture
- List of project management topics
- Microsoft Project
- Project planning
